= Carabus pareysi plassensis =

Scientific classification
- Domain: Eukaryota
- Kingdom: Animalia
- Phylum: Arthropoda
- Class: Insecta
- Order: Coleoptera
- Suborder: Adephaga
- Family: Carabidae
- Genus: Carabus
- Species: C. pareysi
- Subspecies: C. p. plassensis

Trinomial name
- Carabus pareysi plassensis Born, 1907

Subspecies of beetle

Carabus pareysi plassensis is a subspecies of beetle in the family Carabidae that is endemic to Bosnia and Herzegovina.
