= Carabus pareysi pareysi =

Scientific classification
- Domain: Eukaryota
- Kingdom: Animalia
- Phylum: Arthropoda
- Class: Insecta
- Order: Coleoptera
- Suborder: Adephaga
- Family: Carabidae
- Genus: Carabus
- Species: C. pareysi
- Subspecies: C. p. pareysi

Trinomial name
- Carabus pareysi pareysi Palliardi, 1825

Subspecies of beetle

Carabus pareysi pareysi is a subspecies of beetle in the family Carabidae, found in Bosnia and Herzegovina and Croatia.
