= Carabus alpherakii =

Scientific classification
- Kingdom: Animalia
- Phylum: Arthropoda
- Class: Insecta
- Order: Coleoptera
- Suborder: Adephaga
- Family: Carabidae
- Genus: Carabus
- Species: C. alpherakii

Binomial name
- Carabus alpherakii Semenov, 1898

Species of beetle

Carabus alpherakii is a species of ground beetle in the large genus Carabus that is endemic to China.
