= Carabus allegroi =

Scientific classification
- Kingdom: Animalia
- Phylum: Arthropoda
- Class: Insecta
- Order: Coleoptera
- Suborder: Adephaga
- Family: Carabidae
- Genus: Carabus
- Species: C. allegroi

Binomial name
- Carabus allegroi Cavazzuti & Rapuzzi, 2007

Species of beetle

Carabus allegroi is a species of ground beetle in the Carabinae subfamily that is endemic to Gansu, China.
