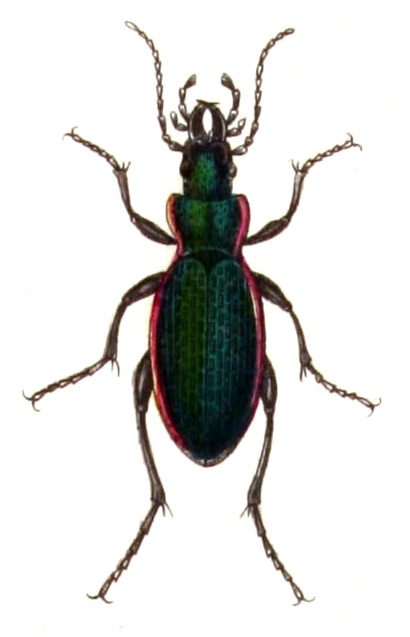

Scientific classification
- Kingdom: Animalia
- Phylum: Arthropoda
- Clade: Pancrustacea
- Class: Insecta
- Order: Coleoptera
- Suborder: Adephaga
- Family: Carabidae
- Genus: Carabus
- Species: C. excellens

Binomial name
- Carabus excellens Fabricius, 1798

= Carabus excellens =

Species of beetle

Carabus excellens is a species of beetle endemic to Europe, where it is observed in Belarus, Moldova, Poland, Romania, central and southern Russia, and Ukraine.
