= Carabus trichothorax =

Scientific classification
- Domain: Eukaryota
- Kingdom: Animalia
- Phylum: Arthropoda
- Class: Insecta
- Order: Coleoptera
- Suborder: Adephaga
- Family: Carabidae
- Genus: Carabus
- Species: C. trichothorax

Binomial name
- Carabus trichothorax Březina & Imura, 1997

Species of beetle

Carabus trichothorax is a species of black-coloured ground beetle in the Carabinae subfamily that is endemic to Sichuan, China.
