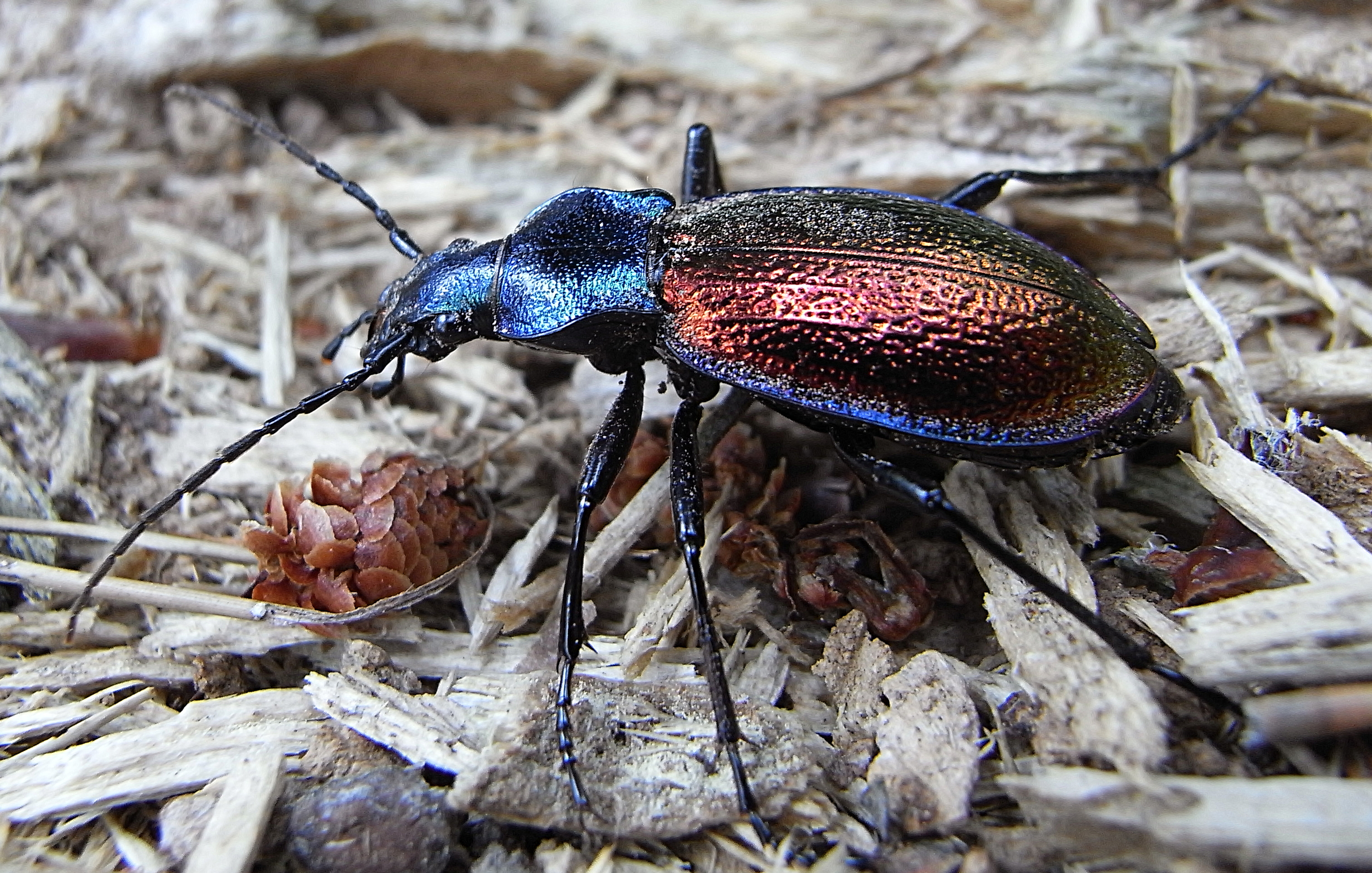

Scientific classification
- Kingdom: Animalia
- Phylum: Arthropoda
- Clade: Pancrustacea
- Class: Insecta
- Order: Coleoptera
- Suborder: Adephaga
- Family: Carabidae
- Genus: Carabus
- Species: C. hispanus

Binomial name
- Carabus hispanus Fabricius, 1787

= Carabus hispanus =

Species of beetle

Carabus hispanus is a species of beetle in family Carabidae native to southwestern France, with the Massif Central as the northern boundary of its distribution range.

== Description ==
Carabus hispanus is a predacious ground beetle. Thus, they are predators and tend to hunt and eat other species. Their diet typically consists of earthworms, slugs, snails, and other insects, gastropods, fruits, and mollusks.

Geographically, these beetles are commonly found in the south-central and southwest French regions of Cévennes, the Drome, and the Landes, and they are a forest species which can typically be found on north-exposed slopes.

The species is known for its colorful and often iridescent exoskeleton, and is considered a larger beetle with females measuring up to 40mm.
