= Carabus vigilax =

Scientific classification
- Kingdom: Animalia
- Phylum: Arthropoda
- Clade: Pancrustacea
- Class: Insecta
- Order: Coleoptera
- Suborder: Adephaga
- Family: Carabidae
- Genus: Carabus
- Species: C. vigilax

Binomial name
- Carabus vigilax Bates, 1890

Species of insect

Carabus vigilax, is a species of ground beetle in the large genus Carabus.
