= Carabus odoratus =

Scientific classification
- Kingdom: Animalia
- Phylum: Arthropoda
- Class: Insecta
- Order: Coleoptera
- Suborder: Adephaga
- Family: Carabidae
- Genus: Carabus
- Species: C. odoratus

Binomial name
- Carabus odoratus Motschulsky, 1844

Species of beetle

Carabus odoratus is a species of ground beetle in the Carabinae subfamily that can be found in Russia and the eastern Palearctic realm.
