= Carabus gigolo =

Scientific classification
- Domain: Eukaryota
- Kingdom: Animalia
- Phylum: Arthropoda
- Class: Insecta
- Order: Coleoptera
- Suborder: Adephaga
- Family: Carabidae
- Genus: Carabus
- Species: C. gigolo

Binomial name
- Carabus gigolo Heinz & Březina, 1996

Species of beetle

Carabus gigolo is a species of ground beetle from the family Carabidae. The species are black in colour.
