= Carabus uenoianus =

Scientific classification
- Domain: Eukaryota
- Kingdom: Animalia
- Phylum: Arthropoda
- Class: Insecta
- Order: Coleoptera
- Suborder: Adephaga
- Family: Carabidae
- Genus: Carabus
- Species: C. uenoianus

Binomial name
- Carabus uenoianus Imura, 1995

Species of insect

Carabus uenoianus, is a species of ground beetle in the large genus Carabus.
