= Carabus vigil =

Scientific classification
- Domain: Eukaryota
- Kingdom: Animalia
- Phylum: Arthropoda
- Class: Insecta
- Order: Coleoptera
- Suborder: Adephaga
- Family: Carabidae
- Genus: Carabus
- Species: C. vigil

Binomial name
- Carabus vigil Semenov, 1898

Species of insect

Carabus vigil, is a species of ground beetle in the large genus Carabus.
