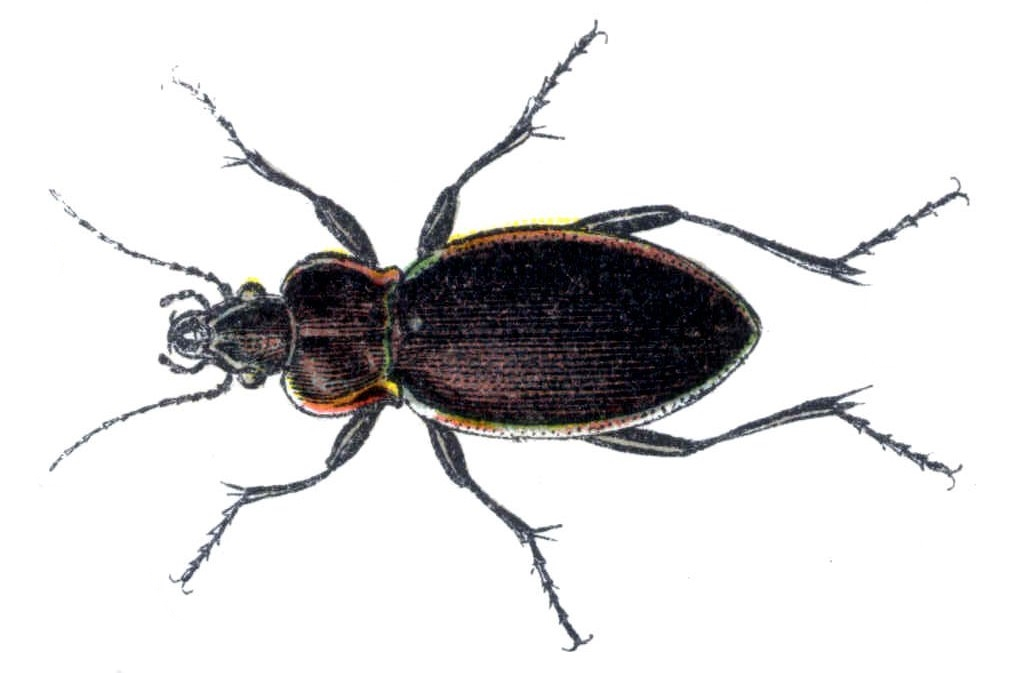

Scientific classification
- Kingdom: Animalia
- Phylum: Arthropoda
- Clade: Pancrustacea
- Class: Insecta
- Order: Coleoptera
- Suborder: Adephaga
- Family: Carabidae
- Genus: Carabus
- Species: C. marginalis

Binomial name
- Carabus marginalis Fabricius, 1794

Synonyms
- Carabus chrysochlorus Fischer, 1812 "S-Russia & Siberia"; Carabus decorus Seidlitz, 1891, nec Panzer, 1800

= Carabus marginalis =

Species of beetle

Carabus marginalis is a species of beetle from family Carabidae, found in Belarus, Germany, Italy, Moldova, Poland, Romania, Russia, and Ukraine.
