= Carabus viridifossulatus =

Scientific classification
- Kingdom: Animalia
- Phylum: Arthropoda
- Class: Insecta
- Order: Coleoptera
- Suborder: Adephaga
- Family: Carabidae
- Genus: Carabus
- Species: C. viridifossulatus

Binomial name
- Carabus viridifossulatus Fairmaire, 1887

Synonyms
- Carabus rizeanus Imura & Su, 1998; Carabus andreii Imura, 1998; Carabus vromanus Lassalle, 2003; Carabus sandaguensis (Imura, Zhou & Su, 2004); Carabus xuechengensis Deuve, 2005

Species of beetle

Carabus viridifossulatus is a species of black-coloured beetle from family Carabidae, found in Gansu, Hubei, and Sichuan provinces of China.
