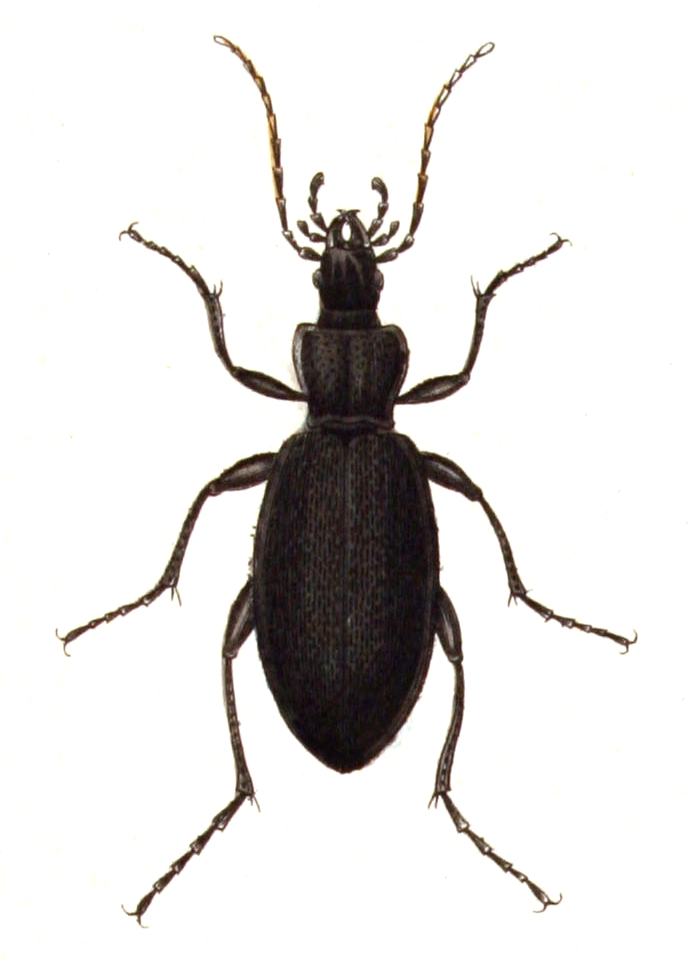

Scientific classification
- Domain: Eukaryota
- Kingdom: Animalia
- Phylum: Arthropoda
- Class: Insecta
- Order: Coleoptera
- Suborder: Adephaga
- Family: Carabidae
- Genus: Carabus
- Species: C. caelatus

Binomial name
- Carabus caelatus Fabricius, 1848

= Carabus caelatus =

Species of beetle

Carabus caelatus is a species of beetle endemic to Europe, where it is observed in Albania, Austria (doubtful), mainland Italy, and all states of former Yugoslavia.
