= Carabus anatolicus =

Scientific classification
- Domain: Eukaryota
- Kingdom: Animalia
- Phylum: Arthropoda
- Class: Insecta
- Order: Coleoptera
- Suborder: Adephaga
- Family: Carabidae
- Genus: Carabus
- Species: C. anatolicus

Binomial name
- Carabus anatolicus Chaudoir, 1857

Species of beetle

Carabus anatolicus is a species of ground beetle from the family Carabidae found on Cyprus and in Near East. The black coloured species can also be found in Turkey.
