= Carabus aurolimbatus =

Scientific classification
- Kingdom: Animalia
- Phylum: Arthropoda
- Class: Insecta
- Order: Coleoptera
- Suborder: Adephaga
- Family: Carabidae
- Genus: Carabus
- Species: C. aurolimbatus

Binomial name
- Carabus aurolimbatus Dejean, 1829

Species of beetle

Carabus aurolimbatus is a species of ground beetle in the genus Carabus.
