= Carabus longeantennatus =

Scientific classification
- Kingdom: Animalia
- Phylum: Arthropoda
- Class: Insecta
- Order: Coleoptera
- Suborder: Adephaga
- Family: Carabidae
- Genus: Carabus
- Species: C. longeantennatus

Binomial name
- Carabus longeantennatus Hauser, 1931

Species of beetle

Carabus longeantennatus is a species of ground beetle in the genus Carabus, first described by Hauser in 1931.

== Subspecies ==
- Carabus longeantennatus acorep Lassalle & Prunier, 1993
- Carabus longeantennatus angulihabitus Kleinfeld, 1998
- Carabus longeantennatus changyangensis Kleinfeld, 1998
- Carabus longeantennatus leigongensis Deuve, 1994
- Carabus longeantennatus longeantennatus Hauser, 1931
- Carabus longeantennatus qianxiensis Deuve, 2002
- Carabus longeantennatus satoi (Imura, 2003)
- Carabus longeantennatus yongshan Kleinfeld, 1999
