= Carabus huangi =

Scientific classification
- Kingdom: Animalia
- Phylum: Arthropoda
- Class: Insecta
- Order: Coleoptera
- Suborder: Adephaga
- Family: Carabidae
- Genus: Carabus
- Species: C. huangi

Binomial name
- Carabus huangi Deuve, 1992

Species of beetle

Carabus huangi is a species of black-coloured beetle from family Carabidae, that is endemic to Sichuan, China.
