= Carabus gansuensis =

Scientific classification
- Domain: Eukaryota
- Kingdom: Animalia
- Phylum: Arthropoda
- Class: Insecta
- Order: Coleoptera
- Suborder: Adephaga
- Family: Carabidae
- Genus: Carabus
- Species: C. gansuensis

Binomial name
- Carabus gansuensis Semenov, 1887

Synonyms
- Pseudocranion gansuensis (Semenov, 1887)

Species of beetle

Carabus gansuensis is a species of black-coloured ground beetle in the subgenus Pseudocranion, within the larger genus Carabus.

It contains 14 accepted subspecies:

- C. gansuensis altiphilus Deuve, 2010
- C. gansuensis amaoensis Kleinfeld & Puchner, 2015
- C. gansuensis baxicola Cavazzuti & Rapuzzi, 2007
- C. gansuensis cupreocaraboides Deuve & Kalab, 2008
- C. gansuensis dilacerans Deuve, 1992
- C. gansuensis gansuensis Semenov, 1887
- C. gansuensis honorandus Cavazzuti, 2011
- C. gansuensis hostilis Cavazzuti, 2002
- C. gansuensis jedompansis Deuve, 1990
- C. gansuensis luhuoensis Deuve, 1994
- C. gansuensis silviphilus Deuve, 1993
- C. gansuensis subvenerandus Deuve & Kalab, 2008
- C. gansuensis tiro Semenov, 1898
- C. gansuensis venerandus Deuve & Mourzine, 1997
