= Carabus azrael =

Scientific classification
- Kingdom: Animalia
- Phylum: Arthropoda
- Class: Insecta
- Order: Coleoptera
- Suborder: Adephaga
- Family: Carabidae
- Genus: Carabus
- Species: C. azrael

Binomial name
- Carabus azrael Semenov & Znojko, 1932

Species of beetle

Carabus azrael is a species of ground beetle in the large genus Carabus that is endemic to parts of China.
