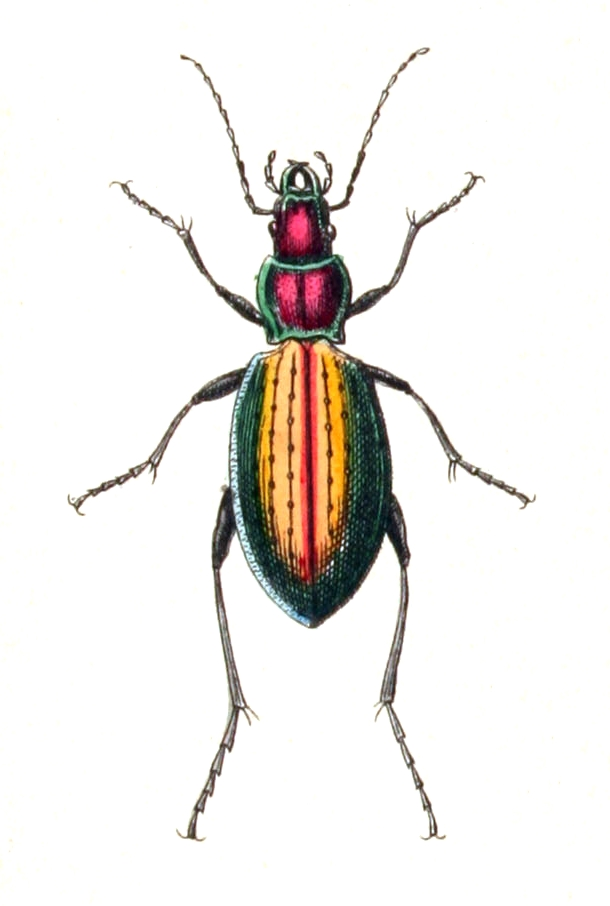

Scientific classification
- Kingdom: Animalia
- Phylum: Arthropoda
- Class: Insecta
- Order: Coleoptera
- Suborder: Adephaga
- Family: Carabidae
- Genus: Carabus
- Species: C. rutilans

Binomial name
- Carabus rutilans Dejean, 1826

= Carabus rutilans =

Species of beetle

Carabus rutilans is a species of ground beetle in the Carabinae subfamily that can be found in Andorra, France, and Spain.
