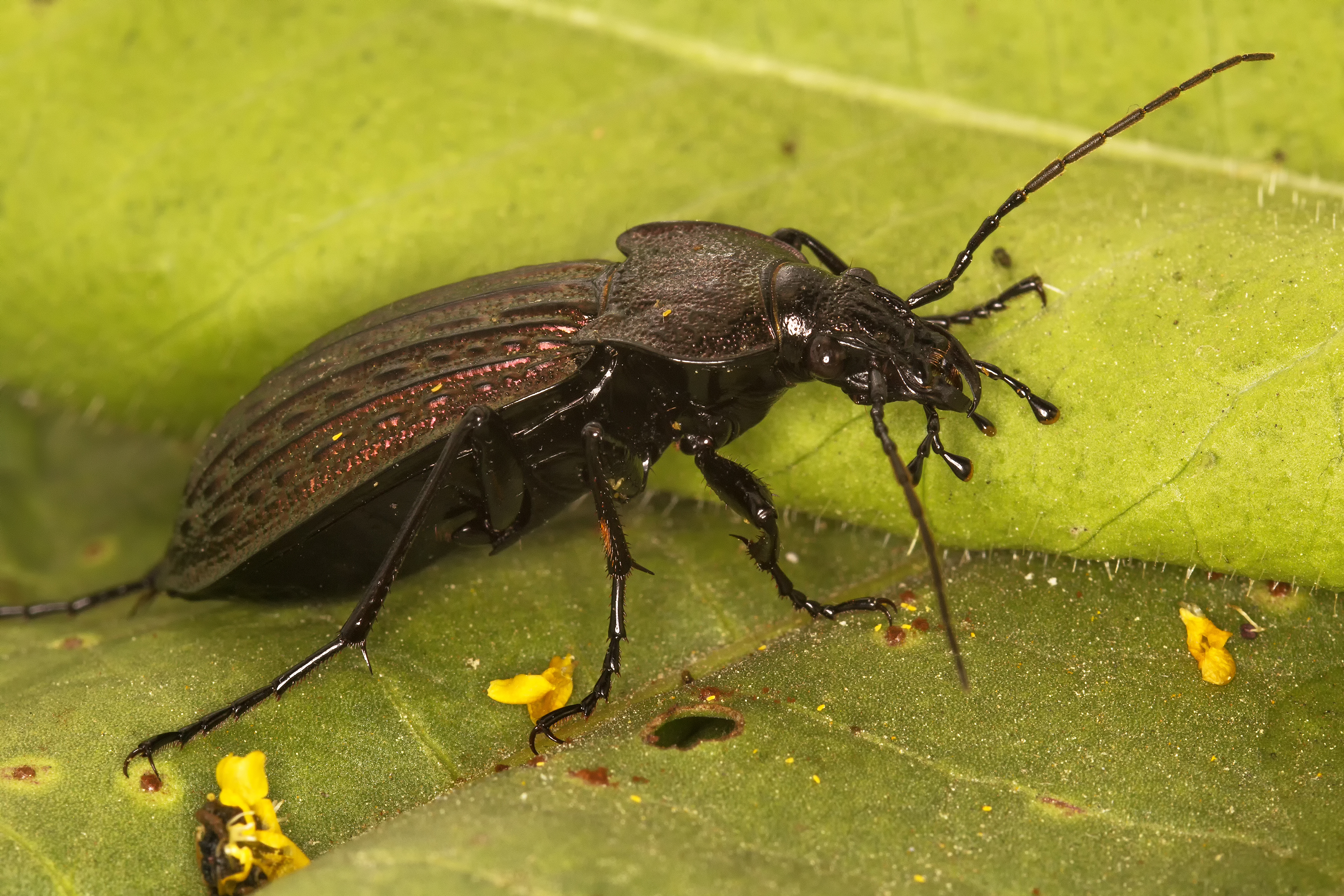

Scientific classification
- Kingdom: Animalia
- Phylum: Arthropoda
- Clade: Pancrustacea
- Class: Insecta
- Order: Coleoptera
- Suborder: Adephaga
- Family: Carabidae
- Genus: Carabus
- Species: C. rugosus

Binomial name
- Carabus rugosus Fabricius, 1792

= Carabus rugosus =

Species of beetle

Carabus rugosus is a species of either black or brown-coloured ground beetle in the Carabinae subfamily that can be found in France, Portugal, Spain, and Morocco.
