= Carabus tibetanophilus =

Scientific classification
- Domain: Eukaryota
- Kingdom: Animalia
- Phylum: Arthropoda
- Class: Insecta
- Order: Coleoptera
- Suborder: Adephaga
- Family: Carabidae
- Genus: Carabus
- Species: C. tibetanophilus

Binomial name
- Carabus tibetanophilus Deuve, 1991

Species of beetle

Carabus tibetanophilus is a species of black-coloured ground beetle in the Carabinae subfamily.
