= Carabus delavayi =

Scientific classification
- Kingdom: Animalia
- Phylum: Arthropoda
- Class: Insecta
- Order: Coleoptera
- Suborder: Adephaga
- Family: Carabidae
- Genus: Carabus
- Species: C. delavayi

Binomial name
- Carabus delavayi Fairmaire, 1886

Species of beetle

Carabus delavayi is a species of ground beetle in the genus Carabus, first described by Léon Fairmaire in 1886.

== Subspecies ==
- Carabus delavayi achilleanus Cavazzuti, 2002
- Carabus delavayi delavayi Fairmaire, 1886
- Carabus delavayi meonoetius Cavazzuti & Rapuzzi, 2010
- Carabus delavayi parvipes Cavazzuti, 1996
- Carabus delavayi patrikeevi Cavazzuti, 2001
- Carabus delavayi planithoracis Kleinfeld, 2006
- Carabus delavayi tenuimanus Deuve & Imura, 1990
- Carabus delavayi yunlongensis Kleinfeld, 2000
- Carabus delavayi yunxiensis Deuve & Mourzine, 2002
