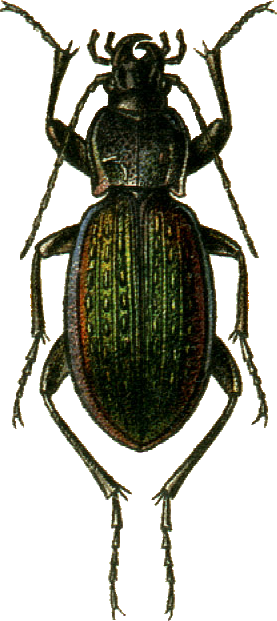

Scientific classification
- Domain: Eukaryota
- Kingdom: Animalia
- Phylum: Arthropoda
- Class: Insecta
- Order: Coleoptera
- Suborder: Adephaga
- Family: Carabidae
- Genus: Carabus
- Species: C. adamsi

Binomial name
- Carabus adamsi M.Adams, 1817

= Carabus adamsi =

Species of beetle

Carabus adamsi is a species of ground beetle in the large genus Carabus that is native to parts of Russia, Georgia and Azerbaijan.
