= Carabus saulcyi =

Scientific classification
- Domain: Eukaryota
- Kingdom: Animalia
- Phylum: Arthropoda
- Class: Insecta
- Order: Coleoptera
- Suborder: Adephaga
- Family: Carabidae
- Genus: Carabus
- Species: C. saulcyi

Binomial name
- Carabus saulcyi Piochard, 1875

Species of beetle

Carabus saulcyi is a species of black coloured beetle from the family Carabidae, found in Lebanon and Syria.
