= Carabus dufourii =

Scientific classification
- Kingdom: Animalia
- Phylum: Arthropoda
- Class: Insecta
- Order: Coleoptera
- Suborder: Adephaga
- Family: Carabidae
- Genus: Carabus
- Species: C. dufourii

Binomial name
- Carabus dufourii Dejean & Boisduval, 1829

Synonyms
- Carabus dufouri

Species of beetle

Carabus dufourii is a species of black-coloured beetle from family Carabidae that are endemic to Spain. It is "one of the most representative species of the Carabus [genus] to the south of the Iberian Peninsula".

== Subspecies ==
The species contain only 2 subspecies which could be found on Gibraltar and in Spain:

- Carabus dufourii baguenai Breuning, 1926 Spain
- Carabus dufourii dufourii Dejean, 1829 Gibraltar & Spain
