= Carabus ignimitella =

Scientific classification
- Domain: Eukaryota
- Kingdom: Animalia
- Phylum: Arthropoda
- Class: Insecta
- Order: Coleoptera
- Suborder: Adephaga
- Family: Carabidae
- Genus: Carabus
- Species: C. ignimitella

Binomial name
- Carabus ignimitella Bates, 1888

Species of beetle

Carabus ignimitella is a species of ground beetle from family Carabidae. The species are black coloured.
