= Carabus kantaikensis =

Scientific classification
- Domain: Eukaryota
- Kingdom: Animalia
- Phylum: Arthropoda
- Class: Insecta
- Order: Coleoptera
- Suborder: Adephaga
- Family: Carabidae
- Genus: Carabus
- Species: C. kantaikensis

Binomial name
- Carabus kantaikensis Lutshnik, 1924

Synonyms
- Carabus ermaki

Species of beetle

Carabus kantaikensis is a species of ground beetle in Carabinae subfamily that are endemic to Russia.
