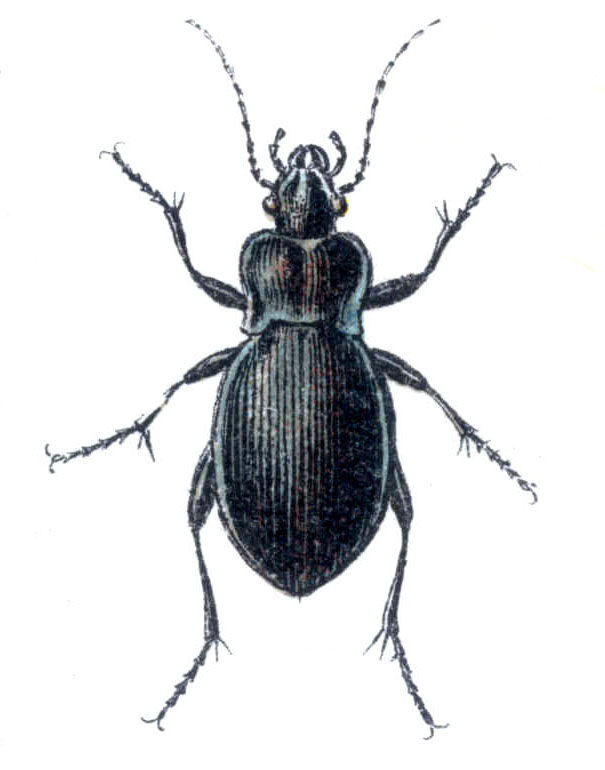

Scientific classification
- Domain: Eukaryota
- Kingdom: Animalia
- Phylum: Arthropoda
- Class: Insecta
- Order: Coleoptera
- Suborder: Adephaga
- Family: Carabidae
- Genus: Carabus
- Species: C. convexus

Binomial name
- Carabus convexus Fabricius, 1775

= Carabus convexus =

Species of beetle

Carabus convexus is a species of beetle found in almost all of Europe, but is somewhat rarer in the extreme Southwest. It is also widespread in East Asia.
