= Carabus karpinskii =

Scientific classification
- Domain: Eukaryota
- Kingdom: Animalia
- Phylum: Arthropoda
- Class: Insecta
- Order: Coleoptera
- Suborder: Adephaga
- Family: Carabidae
- Genus: Carabus
- Species: C. karpinskii

Binomial name
- Carabus karpinskii Kryzhanovskij & Matveev, 1993

Species of beetle

Carabus karpinskii is a species of ground beetle in Carabinae subfamily, that is endemic to Russia. They are wooden or black coloured and could be from 20 to 21 millimetres (0.79 to 0.83 in) long. Their larvae are either whitish-yellow (female) or whitish-brown (male) coloured.
