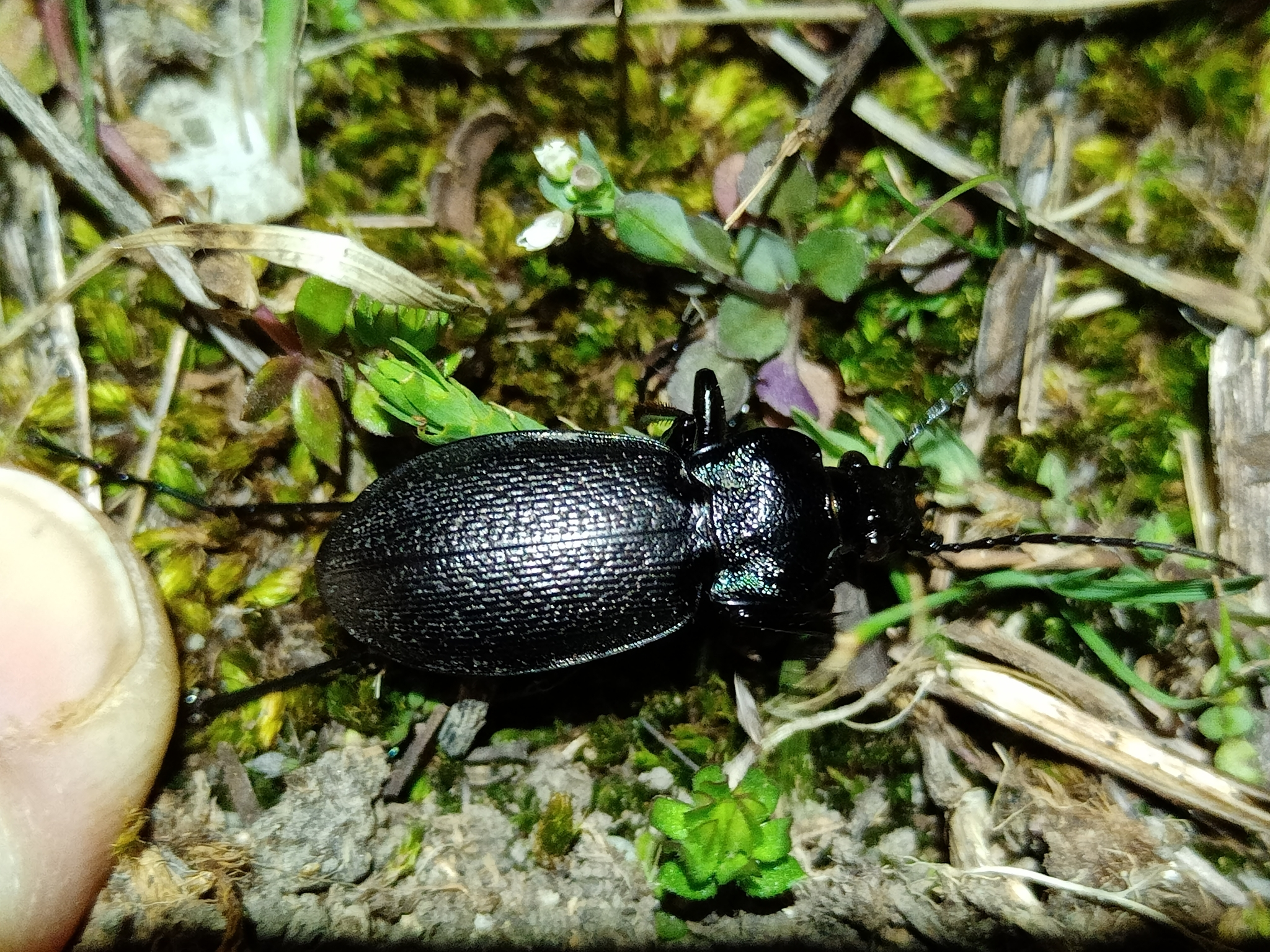
- Carabus rossii in Bologna province, Italy. Source: (c) mnauky, some rights reserved (CC BY)

Scientific classification
- Kingdom: Animalia
- Phylum: Arthropoda
- Class: Insecta
- Order: Coleoptera
- Suborder: Adephaga
- Family: Carabidae
- Genus: Carabus
- Species: C. rossii

Binomial name
- Carabus rossii Dejean, 1826

Synonyms
- Carabus dragonettii Rozzi, 1839; Carabus castaneipennis Costa, 1857; Carabus minor Pirazzoli, 1871, nec Kraatz, 1860 "Abruzzi Mts."; Carabus pirazzolii Gehin, 1876 "Abruzzi Mts."; Carabus costae Gehin, 1885; Carabus stoecklini Lopez, 1891 "Livorno"; Carabus intermedius Porta, 1923, nec Dejean, 1826; Carabus portae Csiki, 1927

= Carabus rossii =

Species of beetle

Carabus rossii is a species of beetle from the family Carabidae, found in Italy. The species are brown-coloured with black pronotum.
