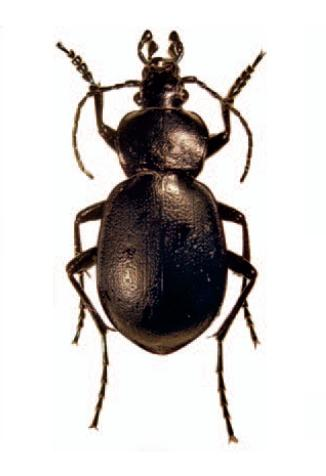

Scientific classification
- Domain: Eukaryota
- Kingdom: Animalia
- Phylum: Arthropoda
- Class: Insecta
- Order: Coleoptera
- Suborder: Adephaga
- Family: Carabidae
- Genus: Carabus
- Species: C. rumelicus

Binomial name
- Carabus rumelicus Chaudoir, 1867

= Carabus rumelicus =

Species of beetle

Carabus rumelicus is a species of gray coloured ground beetle in the Carabinae subfamily that can be found in Central and Eastern Turkey, Northern part of Israel, and in Northwestern Lebanon. It is also found in Iran and Syria. It is 17.5 millimetres (0.69 in) long.
