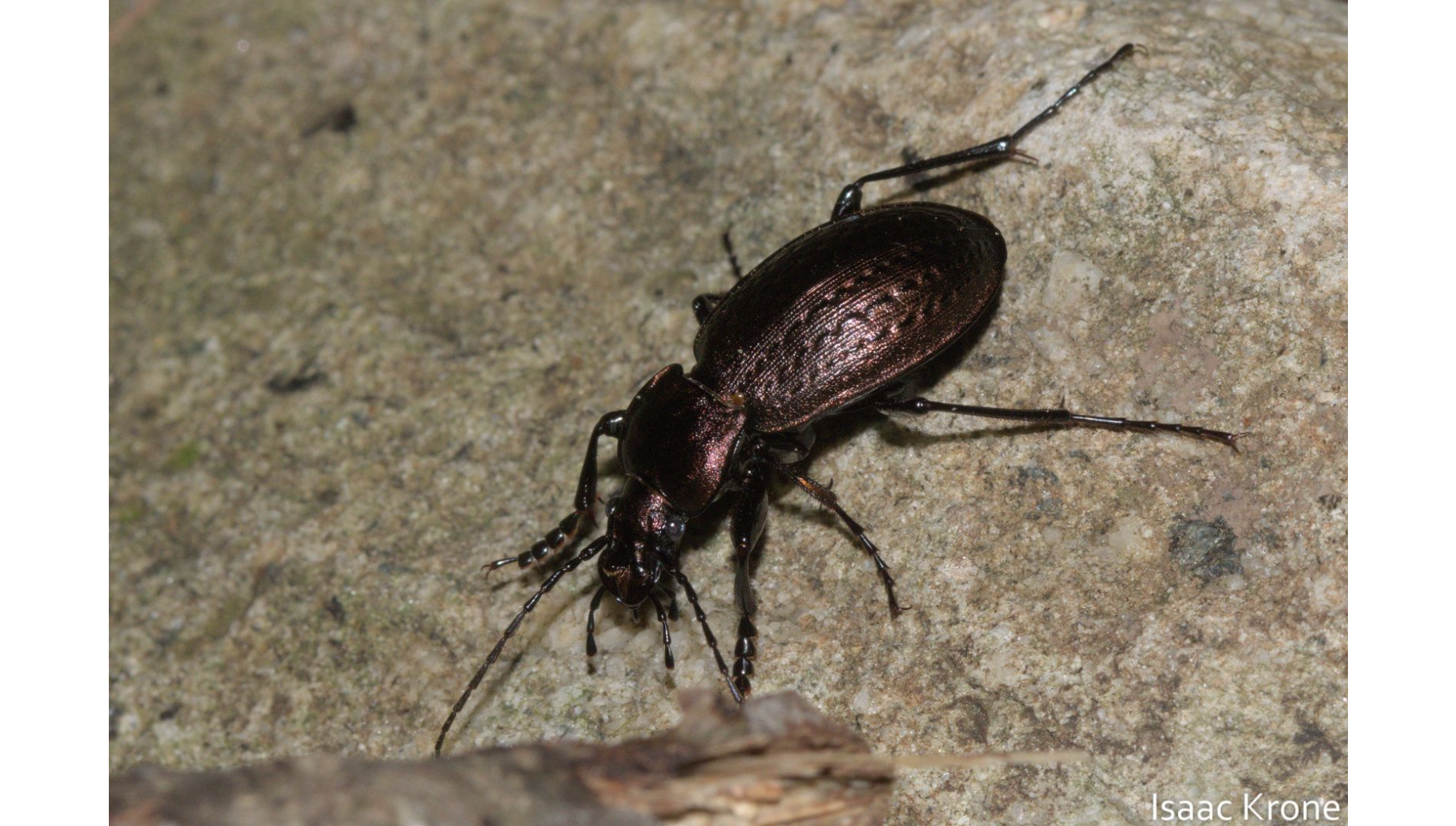

Scientific classification
- Kingdom: Animalia
- Phylum: Arthropoda
- Clade: Pancrustacea
- Class: Insecta
- Order: Coleoptera
- Suborder: Adephaga
- Family: Carabidae
- Genus: Carabus
- Species: C. sternbergi

Binomial name
- Carabus sternbergi Roeschke, 1898

Synonyms
- Eucarabus sternbergi (Roeschke, 1898)

= Carabus sternbergi =

Species of beetle

Carabus sternbergi is a species of ground beetle in the subfamily Carabinae, which was first described in 1898 by German entomologist, Hans Roeschke.

In South Korea, the accepted name may be Eucarabus sternbergi. (See the species list below.)

It is found in China, North Korea, and South Korea.

== Subspecies ==
Six subspecies are listed as valid in Löbl & Löbl, 2017 catalog (p.99-100). These are also listed as valid in the Catalog of Life [from Carabcat], then linked to GBIF.

- Carabus sternbergi gureopensis J.K. & J.Park, 2013
- Carabus sternbergi jindoensis Rapuzzi, 2015
- Carabus sternbergi lauschanensis Born, 1913
- Carabus sternbergi schnelli Lassalle, 1999
- Carabus sternbergi sternbergi Roeschke, 1898
- Carabus sternbergi tongdosanus Kwon & Lee, 1984

Currently (Aug. 2026), Catalog of Life "extended release" [from Carabcat plus Zoobank, etc] plus GBIF lists a total of 10 subspecies:

- Carabus sternbergi cartereti Deuve, 1982 [Only listed via Zoobank, after 2025, but elsewhere as valid species, e.g. in Löbl & Löbl, 2017: 96]
- Carabus sternbergi deogyusan Rapuzzi, 2015 [From Zoobank only, listed as junior synonym of sternbergi sternbergi Roeschke, 1898 in Löbl & Löbl, 2017]
- Carabus sternbergi gimhwa Rapuzzi, 2015 [From Zoobank only, listed as junior synonym of sternbergi sternbergi Roeschke, 1898 in Löbl & Löbl, 2017]
- Carabus sternbergi goheungicus Rapuzzi, 2015 [From Zoobank only, listed as junior synonym of sternbergi sternbergi Roeschke, 1898 in Löbl & Löbl, 2017]

Previously (Pre June. 2026), GBIF also listed

- Carabus sternbergi touzalini Lapouge, 1911 [Not after 2026, now only as a synonym per Carabcat, else listed as junior synonym of sternbergi sternbergi Roeschke, 1898 in Löbl & Löbl, 2017: 100]

Additionally, see several others elsewhere listed as subspecies, including:

- Carabus (Eucarabus) sternbergi fenghuangshanus Imura, 1991 [Later listed as junior synonym of sternbergi sternbergi Roeschke, 1898 in Löbl & Löbl, 2017: 100 and also in Carabcat]
- Carabus honamensis Kwon & Lee, 1984 [Later listed as junior synonym of sternbergi sternbergi Roeschke, 1898 in Löbl & Löbl, 2017: 100, also in Carabcat]
- Carabus sternbergi longior Breuning, 1975 [listed as valid in Rapuzzi, 2015 but as junior synonym of sternbergi sternbergi Roeschke, 1898 in Löbl & Löbl, 2017: 100 or in Carabcat]
- Carabus palgongsanensis Kwon & Lee, 1984 [Later listed as junior synonym of sternbergi sternbergi Roeschke, 1898 in Löbl & Löbl, 2017: 100, also in Carabcat]
- Carabus sobaeksanensis Kwon & Lee, 1984 [Later listed as junior synonym of sternbergi sternbergi Roeschke, 1898 in Löbl & Löbl, 2017: 100, also in Carabcat]

Elsewhere, South Korean authorities list 15 subspecies, but with inconsistent notation for the genus, etc. Of these, "kojedoensis (Kwon et Lee, 1984)" is elsewhere as valid Carabus (Carabus) namhaedoensis kojedoensis Kwon & Lee, 1984 in Löbl & Löbl, 2017: 99.

[? cartereti Deuve, 1982, not found]

- Carabus (Carabus) sternbergi deogyusan Rapuzzi, 2015
- Carabus (Carabus) sternbergi gimhwa Rapuzzi, 2015
- Carabus (Carabus) sternbergi goheungicus Rapuzzi, 2015
- Eucarabus sternbergi gureopensis Park et Park, 2013
- Carabus (Parhomopterus) sternbergi gwangjuensis Kim, 2009 [Additional]
- Eucarabus (Parhomopterus) sternbergi honamensis (Kwon et Lee, 1984)
- Eucarabus (Parhomopterus) sternbergi huchangensis (Kwon et Lee, 1984)
- Carabus (Carabus) sternbergi jindoensis Rapuzzi, 2015
- Eucarabus (Parhomopterus) sternbergi kojedoensis (Kwon et Lee, 1984) [Additional, see as Carabus (Carabus) namhaedoensis kojedoensis Kwon & Lee, 1984 in Löbl & Löbl, 2017: 99.]
- Eucarabus (Parhomopterus) sternbergi schnelli (Lassalle, 1999)
- Eucarabus (Parhomopterus) sternbergi sobaeksanensis (Kwon et Lee, 1984)
- Eucarabus (Parhomopterus) sternbergi sternbergi (Roeschke, 1898)
- Eucarabus (Parhomopterus) sternbergi palgongsanensis (Kwon et Lee, 1984)
- Eucarabus (Parhomopterus) sternbergi tongdosanus (Kwon et Lee, 1984)
- Eucarabus (Parhomopterus) sternbergi touzalini (Lapouge, 1911)
