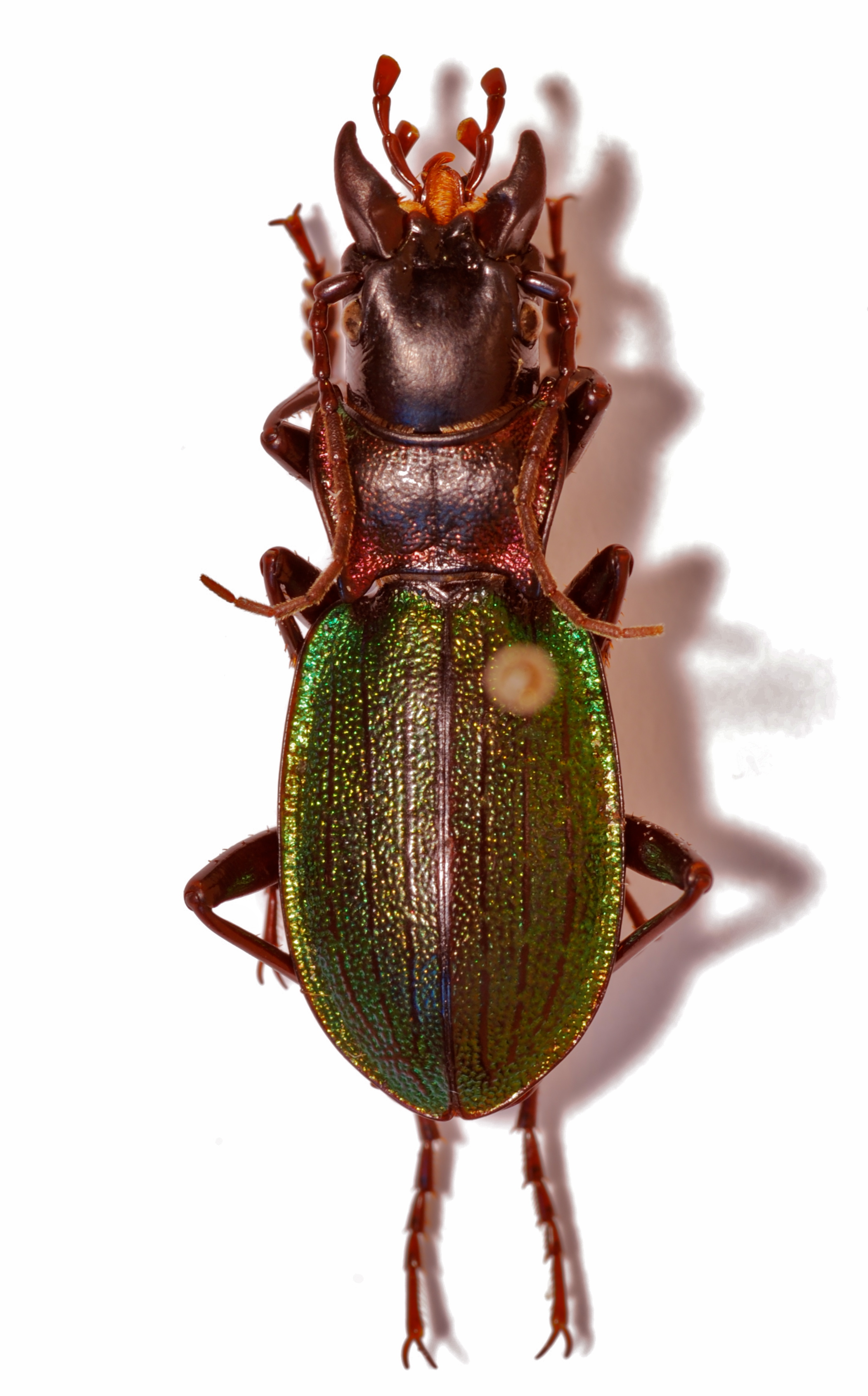
- Ground Beetle (Iniopachus auriculatus) male

Scientific classification
- Domain: Eukaryota
- Kingdom: Animalia
- Phylum: Arthropoda
- Class: Insecta
- Order: Coleoptera
- Suborder: Adephaga
- Family: Carabidae
- Genus: Carabus
- Species: C. auriculatus

Binomial name
- Carabus auriculatus Putzeys, 1872

= Carabus auriculatus =

Species of beetle

Carabus auriculatus is a species of ground beetle in the large genus Carabus.
