= Carabus dietererberi =

Scientific classification
- Kingdom: Animalia
- Phylum: Arthropoda
- Class: Insecta
- Order: Coleoptera
- Suborder: Adephaga
- Family: Carabidae
- Genus: Carabus
- Species: C. dietererberi

Binomial name
- Carabus dietererberi Heinz, 2001

Species of beetle

Carabus dietererberi is a species of beetle from family Carabidae that is endemic to Sichuan, China. They are 20 millimetres (0.79 in) long and have golden pronotum. They could sometimes be green as well.
