= Carabus absonus =

Scientific classification
- Domain: Eukaryota
- Kingdom: Animalia
- Phylum: Arthropoda
- Class: Insecta
- Order: Coleoptera
- Suborder: Adephaga
- Family: Carabidae
- Genus: Carabus
- Species: C. absonus

Binomial name
- Carabus absonus Cavazutti & Rappuzi, 2005

Species of beetle

Carabus absonus is among the 959 species of ground beetle in the genus Carabus.
