= Carabus agamemnon =

Scientific classification
- Kingdom: Animalia
- Phylum: Arthropoda
- Class: Insecta
- Order: Coleoptera
- Suborder: Adephaga
- Family: Carabidae
- Genus: Carabus
- Species: C. agamemnon

Binomial name
- Carabus agamemnon Breuning, 1943

Species of beetle

Carabus agamemnon is a species of ground beetle in the Carabinae subfamily, that is endemic to Sichuan, China. The species are 1 millimetre (0.039 in) long.
