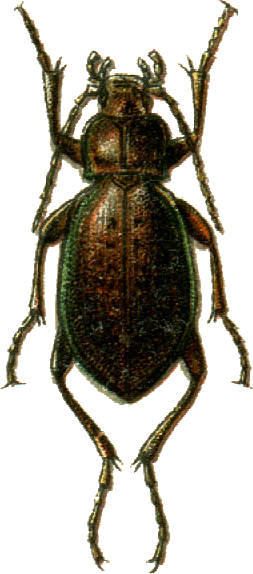

Scientific classification
- Domain: Eukaryota
- Kingdom: Animalia
- Phylum: Arthropoda
- Class: Insecta
- Order: Coleoptera
- Suborder: Adephaga
- Family: Carabidae
- Genus: Carabus
- Species: C. loschnikovii

Binomial name
- Carabus loschnikovii Fischer von Waldheim, 1823

Synonyms
- Carabus loschnikovi

= Carabus loschnikovii =

Species of beetle

Carabus loschnikovii is a species of ground beetle in the family Carabidae. The species is found in the Siberian mountain forests, alpine meadows, and tundra of Northeastern European Russia, the Western and Central Urals, and mountains of Southern Siberia and Northern Mongolia.

== Subspecies ==
These two subspecies belong to the species Carabus loschnikovii:

- Carabus loschnikovii loschnikovii Fischer von Waldheim, 1823 (Kazakhstan, Mongolia, and Russia)
- Carabus loschnikovii tsaganensis Obydov, 2001 (Russia)
