= Carabus haeckeli =

Scientific classification
- Kingdom: Animalia
- Phylum: Arthropoda
- Class: Insecta
- Order: Coleoptera
- Suborder: Adephaga
- Family: Carabidae
- Genus: Carabus
- Species: C. haeckeli

Binomial name
- Carabus haeckeli Březina & Imura, 1997

Species of beetle

Carabus haeckeli is a species of green-coloured beetle from family Carabidae which is endemic to Shaanxi, China.
