= Carabus principalis =

Scientific classification
- Kingdom: Animalia
- Phylum: Arthropoda
- Clade: Pancrustacea
- Class: Insecta
- Order: Coleoptera
- Suborder: Adephaga
- Family: Carabidae
- Genus: Carabus
- Species: C. principalis

Binomial name
- Carabus principalis Bates, 1889

Species of beetle

Carabus principalis is a species of ground beetle from the family Carabidae. They are green coloured with brown pronotum. They are known to reside in China, within the provinces of Zhejiang, Hubei and Hunan.
