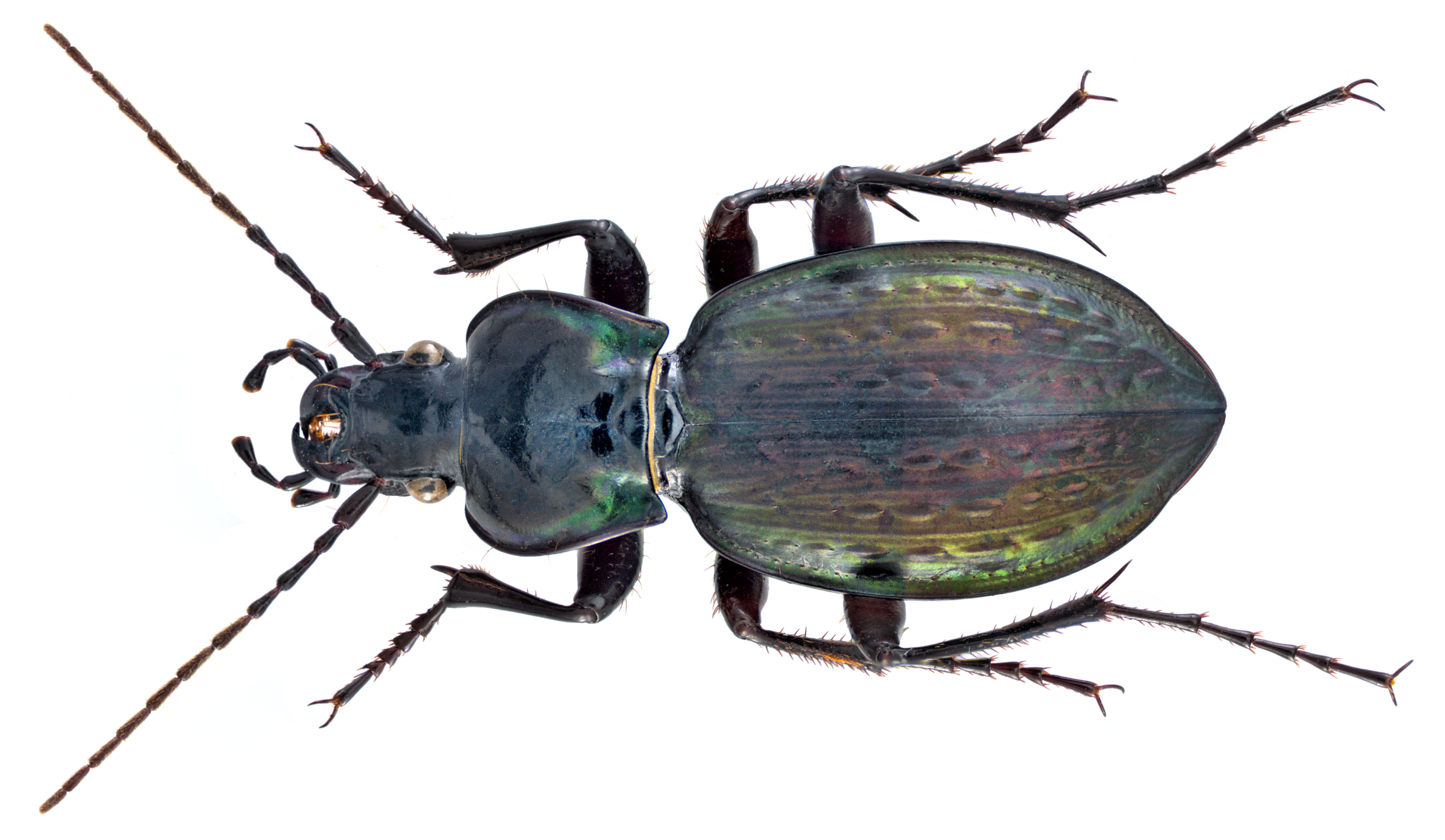

Scientific classification
- Kingdom: Animalia
- Phylum: Arthropoda
- Clade: Pancrustacea
- Class: Insecta
- Order: Coleoptera
- Suborder: Adephaga
- Family: Carabidae
- Genus: Carabus
- Species: C. faustus

Binomial name
- Carabus faustus Brulle, 1836

= Carabus faustus =

Species of beetle

Carabus faustus is a species of ground beetle from Carabinae subfamily that is endemic to the Canary Islands.
