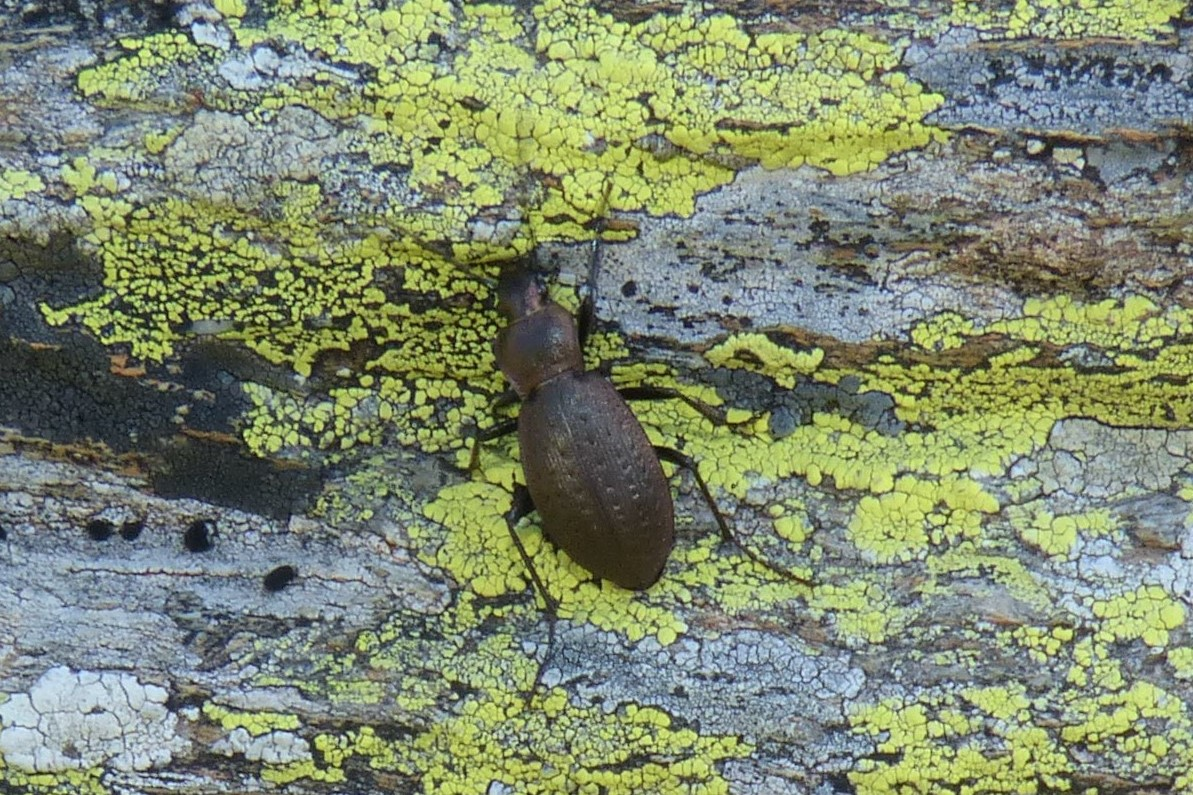

Scientific classification
- Kingdom: Animalia
- Phylum: Arthropoda
- Clade: Pancrustacea
- Class: Insecta
- Order: Coleoptera
- Suborder: Adephaga
- Family: Carabidae
- Genus: Carabus
- Species: C. concolor

Binomial name
- Carabus concolor Fabricius, 1792

= Carabus concolor =

Species of beetle

Carabus concolor is a species of beetle from ground beetle family that can be found in Italy, Liechtenstein, and Switzerland. The species are brown coloured.
