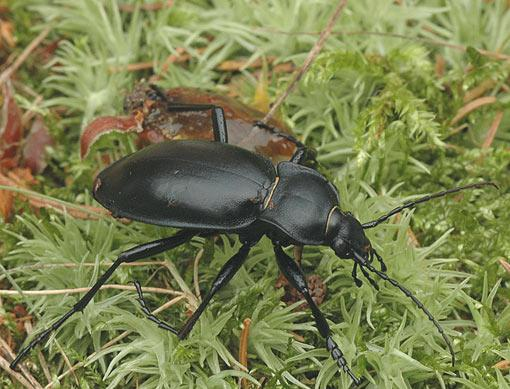
- Carabus glabratus

Scientific classification
- Kingdom: Animalia
- Phylum: Arthropoda
- Clade: Pancrustacea
- Class: Insecta
- Order: Coleoptera
- Suborder: Adephaga
- Family: Carabidae
- Subfamily: Carabinae
- Tribe: Carabini
- Genus: Carabus; Linnaeus, 1758

Synonyms
- Leptinocarabus Reitter, 1895

= Carabus =

Genus of beetles

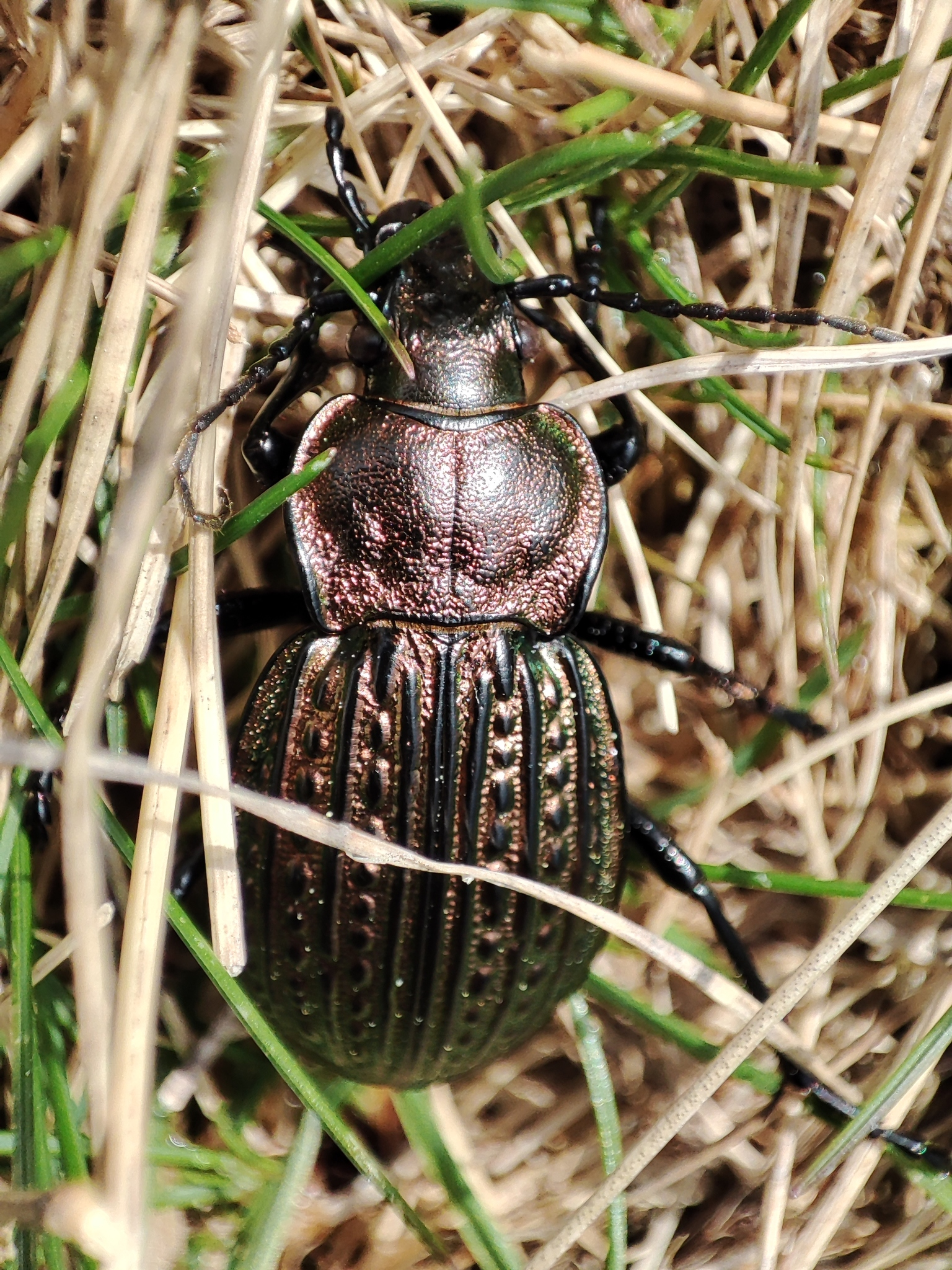
Carabus ulrichii, Romania

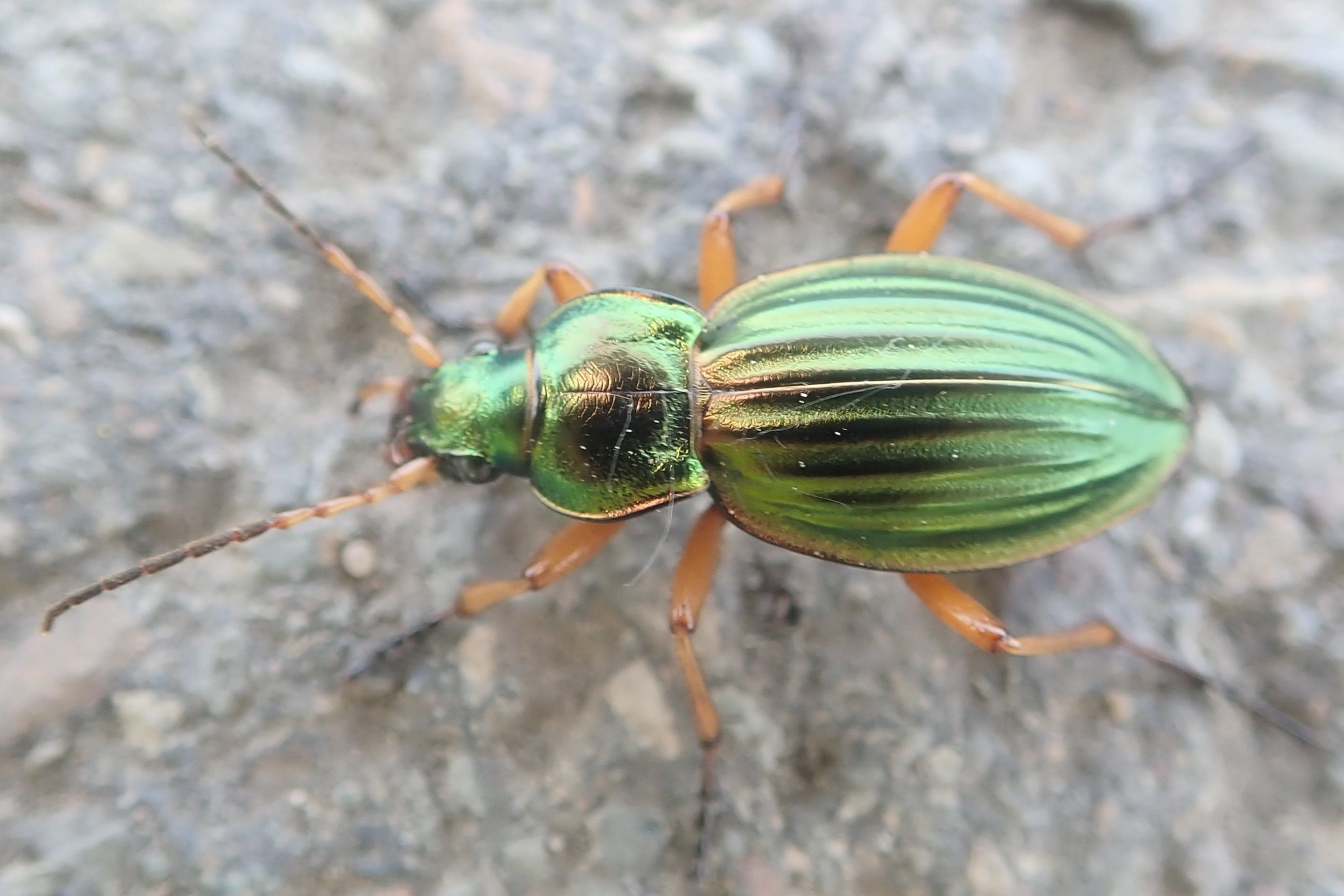
Carabus auratus, Germany

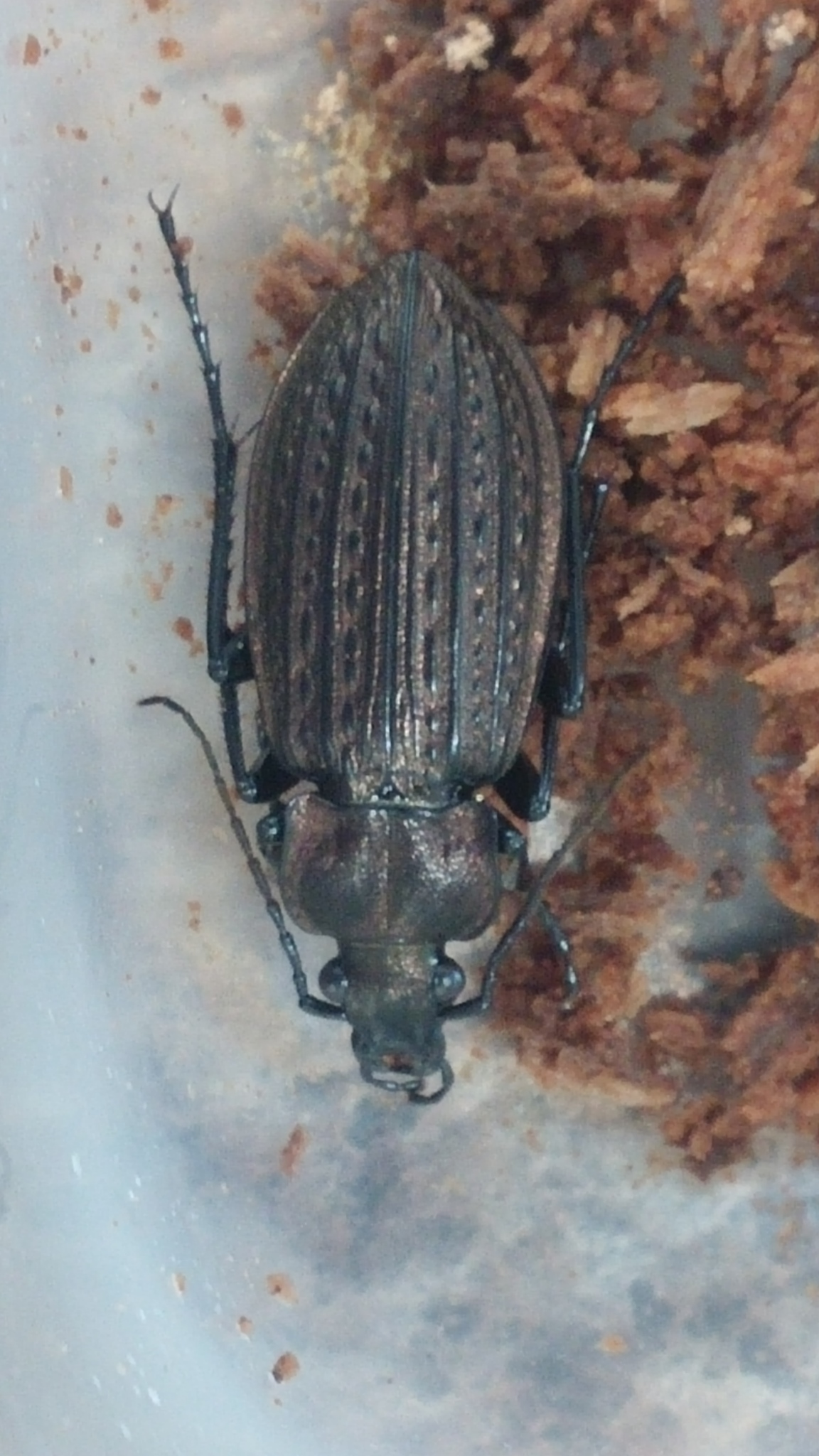
Carabus granulatus, Canada

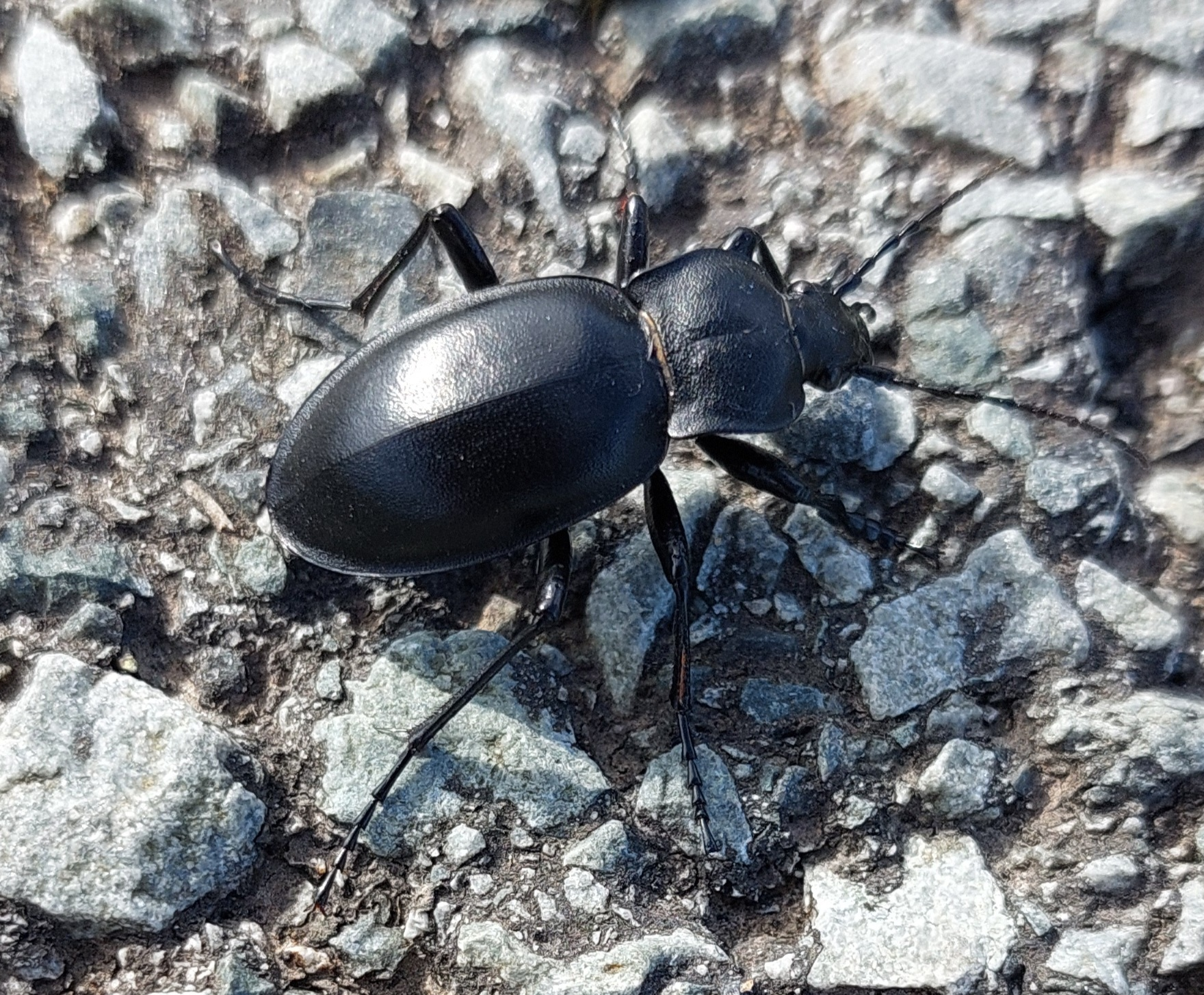
Carabus glabratus, UK

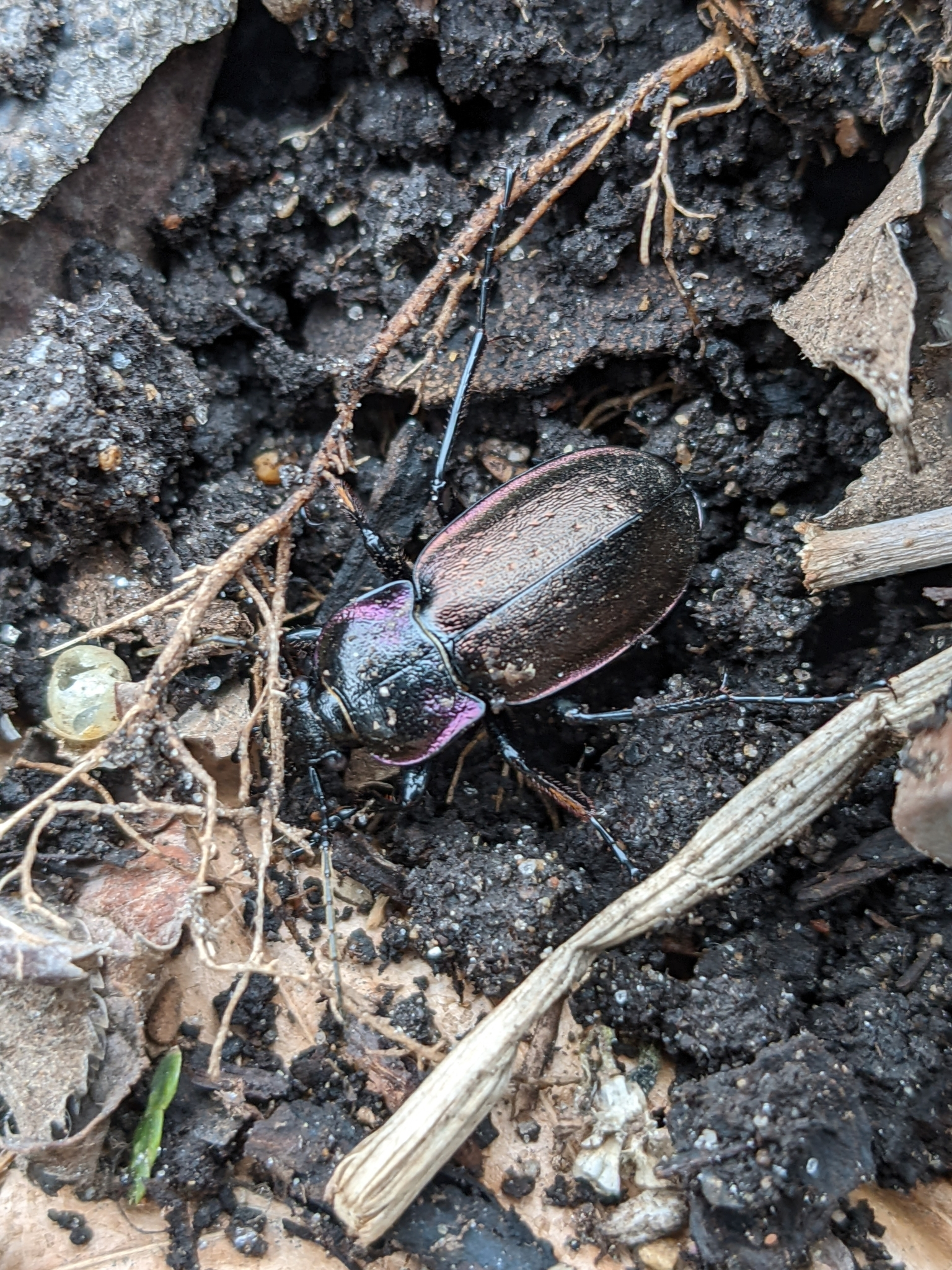
Carabus nemoralis, Canada

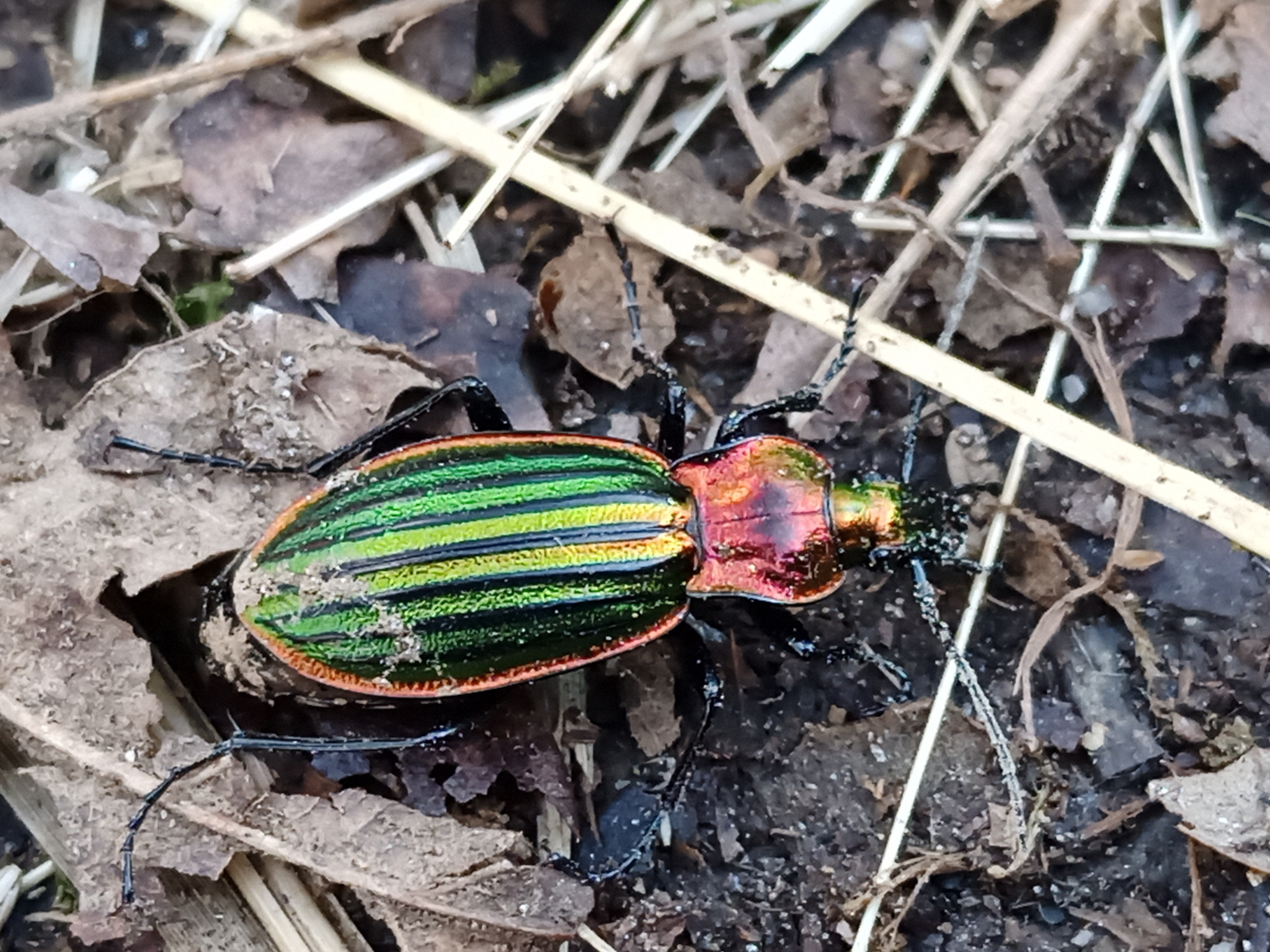
Carabus lineatus lateralis, Spain

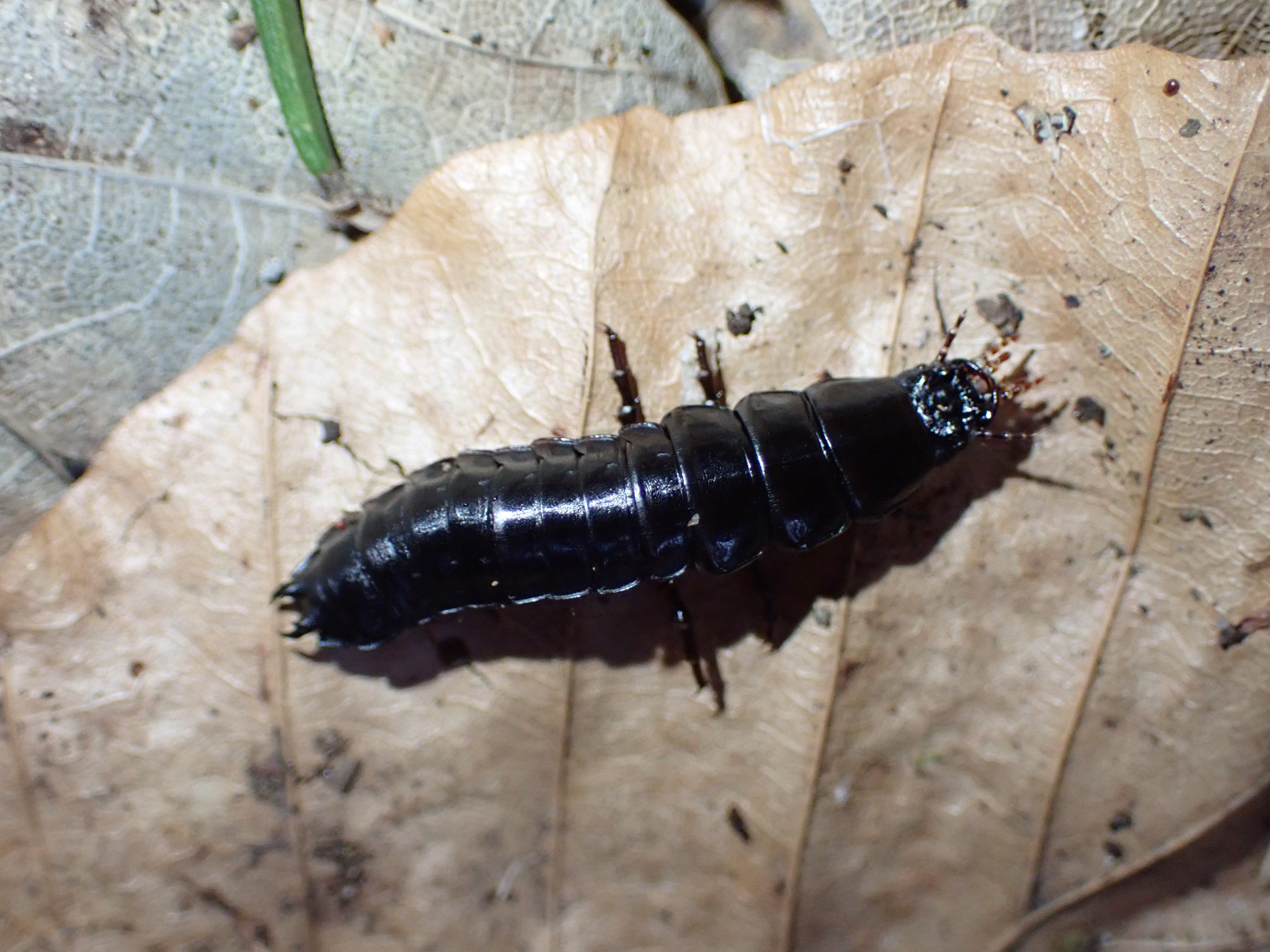
Carabus larva, Switzerland

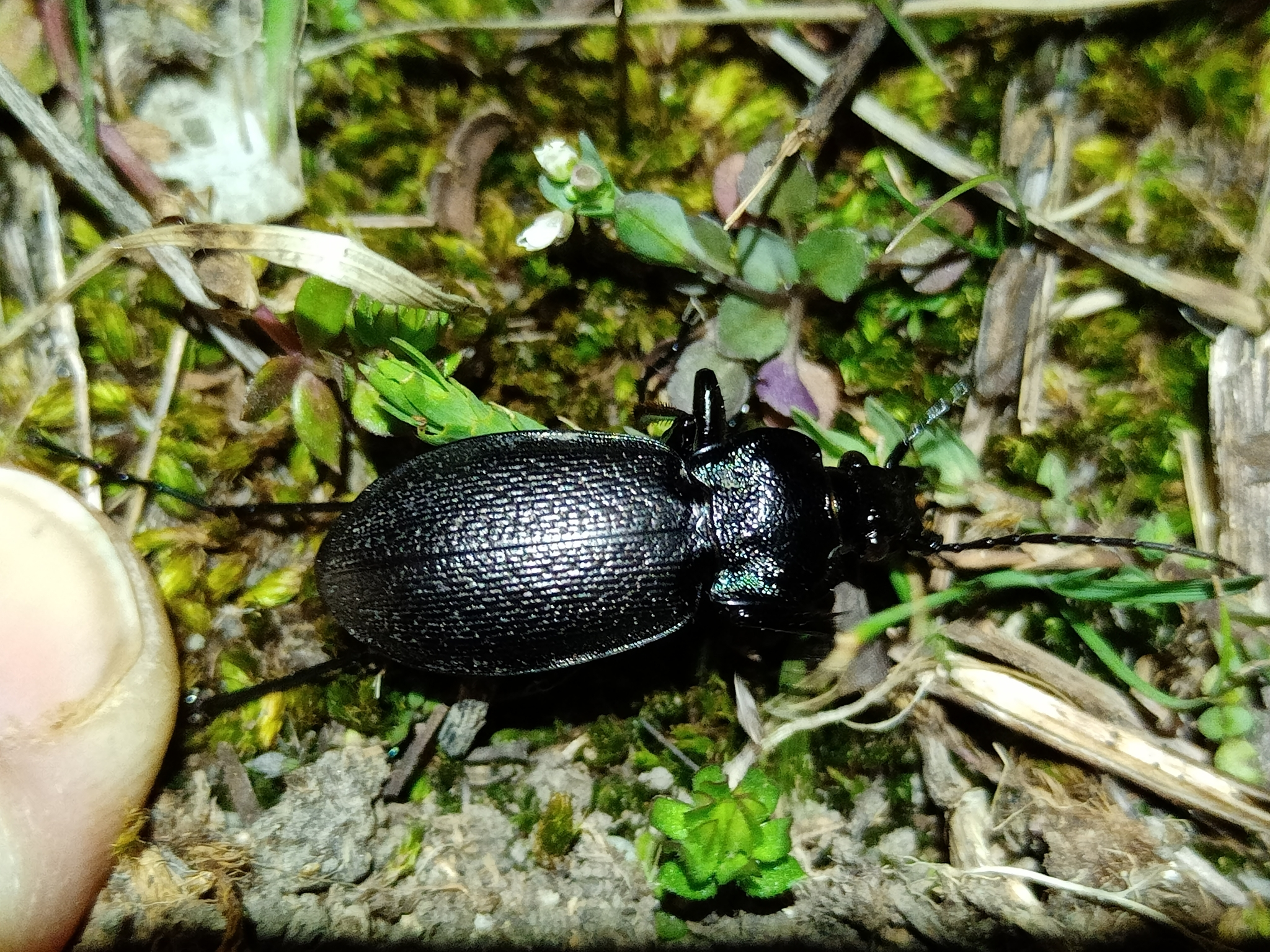
Carabus rossii, Italy

Carabus is a genus of beetles in the family Carabidae, and was first described in 1758 by Carl Linnaeus.

The genus is highly diverse with 94 subgenera, over 900 species and 2300 subspecies, thus is the largest genus in the subfamily Carabinae. The vast majority are native to the Palearctic, but 16 Nearctic species are also known. Carabus species are 12–50 mm (0.47–1.97 in) long, and most species are wingless and often very colourful. These are nocturnal, predatory beetles that feed on snails, earthworms, and caterpillars. Most Carabus species were thought to have inhabited the Eurasian forest, but their low dispersal abilities altered the distribution of lineages within the genus.

== Diet ==
Adult Carabus feed on both small live and dead animals such as slugs, snails, earthworms, and insects in all stages, sometimes dead vertebrates. The ways of feeding on snails are different for their adaptations, as macrocephalic beetles feed on snails by crushing the snail shell, and stenocephalic beetles feed on snails by inserting their heads into the snail shell.

== Species ==
Subgenus Acathaicus Reitter, 1896
Carabus alexandrae Semenov, 1887

Subgenus Acoptolabrus A.Morawitz, 1886

Carabus changgeonleei (Ishikawa & Kim, 1983)
Carabus constricticollis (Kraatz, 1886)
Carabus gehinii Fairmaire, 1876
Carabus haeckeli Brezina & Imura, 1997
Carabus jingkeanus A.Müller, 2007
Carabus leechi (Bates, 1888)
Carabus lopatini A.Morawitz, 1886
Carabus mirabilissimus (Ishikawa & Deuve, 1982)
Carabus planicranion Rapuzzi, 2015
Carabus schrenckii (Motschulsky, 1860)

Subgenus Acoptopterus Lapouge, 1927

Carabus agamemnon Breuning, 1943
Carabus andreiianus Deuve, 2007
Carabus anhuinus Imura, 1996
Carabus baimanorum Deuve, 1999
Carabus baogai Häckel & Sehnal, 2009
Carabus battoniensis Deuve, 1991
Carabus bornianus G.Hauser, 1922
Carabus dabashanus Imura, 1995
Carabus daiyunshan Kleinfeld, 1998
Carabus dongchuanicus Deuve, 1994
Carabus donjuan (Imura, 2011)
Carabus dreuxioides Deuve, 1998
Carabus emanuelei Imura, 1997
Carabus fontellus Deuve, 1997
Carabus jinnanicus Deuve & Tian, 2006
Carabus koidei Imura, 1996
Carabus kucerai Deuve, 1997
Carabus kweitshauensis Mandl, 1975
Carabus lacertosus Cavazzuti, 2008
Carabus latipennis Breuning, 1932
Carabus ludingensis Deuve & Vigna Taglianti, 1992
Carabus maowenensis Deuve, 2001
Carabus mianningensis Kleinfeld, 2000
Carabus mirandus Cavazzuti & Rapuzzi, 2005
Carabus morphocaraboides Deuve, 1989
Carabus nanosomus (G.Hauser, 1931)
Carabus nestor (Breuning, 1934)
Carabus oblongior Deuve, 1992
Carabus ohomopteroides Deuve & Tian, 2004
Carabus paris Breuning, 1932
Carabus platyfluvius Imura, 2012
Carabus pseudolatipennis Deuve, 1991
Carabus relictus Semenov, 1898
Carabus roccaianus Deuve, 2011
Carabus tianbaoshan Kleinfeld, 1998
Carabus tieguanzi Imura, 1990
Carabus vigil Semenov, 1898
Carabus vigilax Bates, 1890
Carabus wutaishanicus A.Müller, 2000
Carabus xupuensis Kleinfeld, 1998
Carabus yunnanus Fairmaire, 1886

Subgenus Acrocarabus Lapouge, 1930
Carabus callisthenoides Semenov, 1888
Carabus guerini Fischer von Waldheim, 1842

Subgenus Alipaster Reitter, 1896

Carabus barovskii Semenov & Znojko, 1932
Carabus dengyuani Deuve & Tian, 2012
Carabus dshungaricola Deuve, 1990
Carabus eokirgisicus Kabak, 1990
Carabus eous A.Morawitz, 1889
Carabus eugeniellus Obydov, 2000
Carabus foreli G.Hauser, 1922
Carabus hiekei Kabak & Kryzhanovskij, 1990
Carabus infantulus A.Morawitz, 1886
Carabus karkarensis Kabak & Ovtshinnikov, 1994
Carabus khalyktauensis Kabak, 2005
Carabus kiritschenkoi Breuning, 1934
Carabus malkovskyi Kabak, 1990
Carabus manap Brezina & Kabak, 1993
Carabus pauliani Deuve, 2004
Carabus pupulus A.Morawitz, 1889
Carabus rueckbeili Breuning, 1932
Carabus semenovianus Breuning, 1932
Carabus semenoviellus Breuning, 1932
Carabus shirtalensis Gottwald, 1990
Carabus thianshanskii Breuning, 1932
Carabus tianshanicola Deuve & Tian, 2003
Carabus valikhanovi Kabak, 1990

Subgenus Apoplesius Deuve, 1990
Carabus omphreodes Reitter, 1898

Subgenus Apotomopterus Hope, 1838

Carabus adolescens (G.Hauser, 1925)
Carabus aeneocupreus (G.Hauser, 1932)
Carabus ajax Breuning, 1933
Carabus angermaieri Kleinfeld, 2008
Carabus anlongensis Deuve & Tian, 2006
Carabus antoniettae Cavazzuti, 2002
Carabus anxiensis Kleinfeld, 1998
Carabus arrowi G.Hauser, 1913
Carabus benardi Breuning, 1931
Carabus birmanus Andrewes, 1929
Carabus boulbenianus Deuve, 1996
Carabus bousquetellus Deuve, 1998
Carabus breuningianus Lemoult, 1930
Carabus candidiequus (Imura, 2009)
Carabus cantonensis (G.Hauser, 1918)
Carabus caoyutangicus Deuve, 2009
Carabus casaleianus Deuve, 1994
Carabus cavazzutiellus Deuve, 2002
Carabus cenwangensis Deuve & Tian, 2002
Carabus chadianus Cavazzuti & Ratti, 1999
Carabus cheni Deuve, 1992
Carabus chenianus Deuve & Tian, 1999
Carabus circe Cavazzuti & Ratti, 1998
Carabus clermontianus Breuning, 1933
Carabus cyanopterus G.Hauser, 1919
Carabus dabamontanus Imura, 1996
Carabus dapanshanicus Deuve, 2013
Carabus datianshanicus Kleinfeld, 1997
Carabus davidis H.Deyrolle, 1878
Carabus dechambreianus Deuve & Li, 2000
Carabus delavayi Fairmaire, 1886
Carabus dilatatipennis Rapuzzi & Cavazzuti, 2006
Carabus ebian Cavazzuti & Rapuzzi, 2010
Carabus eccoptopteroides Rapuzzi, 2012
Carabus eccoptopterus (Kraatz, 1894)
Carabus elektra Kleinfeld, 2004
Carabus elliptipennis Deuve, 1995
Carabus fallettiellus Deuve, 1998
Carabus fanjinensis Deuve & Tian, 2001
Carabus feae Gestro, 1888
Carabus flavihervosus (Imura, 2009)
Carabus foveatus (G.Hauser, 1913)
Carabus francottei Rapuzzi, 2012
Carabus fushuangensis Deuve, 1997
Carabus gracilithorax Deuve, 1989
Carabus grossefoveatus (G.Hauser, 1913)
Carabus guangxicus Deuve, 1989
Carabus guibeicus Deuve & Tian, 1999
Carabus guzhangensis Kleinfeld, 1998
Carabus hera Kleinfeld, 2000
Carabus hiekeianus Deuve, 1991
Carabus huangianus Deuve & Tian, 2003
Carabus hubeicus Deuve, 1991
Carabus ichangensis Bates, 1889
Carabus inagakii Deuve, 1991
Carabus infirmior (G.Hauser, 1924)
Carabus inventoides Deuve & Li in Deuve, 2000
Carabus inventus Cavazzuti, 1999
Carabus jingliae Deuve & Tian, 2019
Carabus jingzhongensis Deuve & Tian, 2005
Carabus kafka Kleinfeld & Reuter, 2010
Carabus keithi Deuve, 1995
Carabus koiwayai Deuve & Imura, 1990
Carabus korellianus Kleinfeld, 2002
Carabus kouanping Maindron, 1906
Carabus kouichii Imura & Mizusawa, 1997
Carabus kryzhanovskianus Deuve, 1992
Carabus lamarcki Deuve, 1994
Carabus lambrechti Kleinfeld, 2006
Carabus laoshanicus Imura, 1995
Carabus leda Kleinfeld, 2000
Carabus lizizhongi Deuve & Tian, 2007
Carabus longeantennatus (G.Hauser, 1931)
Carabus ludivinae Deuve, 1996
Carabus luschanensis (G.Hauser, 1919)
Carabus madefactus Cavazzuti, 1997
Carabus malaisei Breuning, 1947
Carabus maoershanicus Cavazzuti, 1995
Carabus marcilhacianus Deuve & Tian, 2010
Carabus masuzoi (Imura & Satô, 1989)
Carabus mecynodes Bates, 1890
Carabus melli (Born, 1923)
Carabus menelaus Breuning, 1951
Carabus microtatos Cavazzuti, 1997
Carabus ngi Deuve, 1994
Carabus nigrovagans Deuve, 2016
Carabus novenumus Deuve, 1995
Carabus odysseus Breuning, 1932
Carabus pangi Deuve & Tian, 1999
Carabus patroclus Breuning, 1933
Carabus penelope Kleinfeld, 1997
Carabus pineticola Deuve & Mourzine, 2004
Carabus prattianus Bates, 1890
Carabus prodigus Erichson, 1834
Carabus protenes Bates, 1889
Carabus pseudocenwangensis Deuve & Tian, 2005
Carabus pseudoguizhouensis Kleinfeld, 2006
Carabus pseudotorquatus Deuve, 1995
Carabus rapuzzi Kleinfeld, 2000
Carabus reni Deuve & Tian, 2009
Carabus rugulothorax Deuve, 2016
Carabus saga Cavazzuti, 1997
Carabus sauteri Roeschke, 1912
Carabus schuetzei Kleinfeld, 1998
Carabus semelai Deuve, 1995
Carabus shun Deuve, 1995
Carabus solidior Deuve & Imura, 1990
Carabus tanakaianus (Imura, 2005)
Carabus tarasovinus Deuve, 2009
Carabus telemachus (G.Hauser, 1925)
Carabus tengchongicola Deuve, 1999
Carabus thilliezi Deuve, 1994
Carabus thoraciculus Cavazzuti, 1998
Carabus tiani Deuve, 2013
Carabus tibeticus Cavazzuti & Rapuzzi, 2005
Carabus tientei J.Thomson, 1857
Carabus tonkinensis Deuve, 1990
Carabus torquatus Cavazzuti, 1995
Carabus toulgoeti Deuve, 1989
Carabus tuxeni Mandl, 1979
Carabus vitalisi Lapouge, 1918
Carabus vogtae Beheim & Breuning, 1943
Carabus wangziensis Deuve & Tian, 2005
Carabus wumingensis Deuve, 1992
Carabus xianhensis Deuve & Tian, 2007
Carabus xiaoxiangensis Deuve, 1995
Carabus yaophilus Deuve, 1990
Carabus yaorenensis Deuve, 2011
Carabus yinjiangicus Deuve & Tian, 2001
Carabus yonganensis Deuve, 2008
Carabus yuae Deuve, 1989
Carabus yuanbaoensis Deuve, 1994
Carabus yuanshanensis Kleinfeld, 1996
Carabus yunanensis (Born, 1905)
Carabus yundongbeicus Deuve, 2002
Carabus yunlingensis Deuve, 1991
Carabus yunnanicola Deuve, 1989
Carabus zengae Deuve & Tian, 2000

Subgenus Archicarabus Seidlitz, 1887

Carabus alysidotus Illiger, 1798
Carabus monticola Dejean, 1826
Carabus montivagus Palliardi, 1825
Carabus nemoralis O.F.Müller, 1764
Carabus phoenix Lapouge, 1925
Carabus pseudomonticola Lapouge, 1908
Carabus rossii Dejean, 1826
Carabus steuartii A.Deyrolle, 1852
Carabus victor Fischer von Waldheim, 1836
Carabus wiedemanni Ménétriés, 1836

Subgenus Aristocarabus Semenov, 1897
Carabus romanowi Semenov, 1897
Carabus viridifossulatus Fairmaire, 1887

Subgenus Aulonocarabus Reitter, 1896

Carabus canaliculatus M.Adams, 1812
Carabus gaschkewitschi Motschulsky, 1859
Carabus gossarei Haury, 1879
Carabus kabakovi Lafer, 1989
Carabus kolymensis Lafer, 1989
Carabus kurilensis Lapouge, 1913
Carabus mouthiezianus Deuve, 1991
Carabus nangnimicus Blumenthal & Deuve, 1984
Carabus pseudokoreanus Breuning, 1932
Carabus truncaticollis Eschscholtz, 1833

Subgenus Axinocarabus A.Morawitz, 1886
Carabus fedtschenkoi Solsky, 1874

Subgenus Calocarabus Semenov, 1887

Carabus aristochroides Deuve, 1992
Carabus aurocostulus Deuve & Kalab, 2018
Carabus benpo Kalab, 2007
Carabus deuvianus Cavazzuti & Casale, 2006
Carabus dietererberi Heinz, 2001
Carabus gratus Semenov, 1887
Carabus guinanensis Deuve, 1991
Carabus janatai Brezina, 1996
Carabus juengerianus Kleinfeld, 1995
Carabus kalabi Deuve, 1990
Carabus linxiaensis Deuve, 1992
Carabus luzeicola Kalab, 2005
Carabus mandarin Kalab, 2002
Carabus miraculix Kleinfeld & Puchner, 2011
Carabus nevestimus (Imura, 2005)
Carabus przewalskii A.Morawitz, 1886
Carabus punctatocostulus Deuve & Kalab, 2018
Carabus sementivus (Imura, 2005)
Carabus sifanicus Semenov, 1898
Carabus trichothorax Brezina & Imura, 1997
Carabus turnaianus Deuve, 1995
Carabus worahniki Kleinfeld & Puchner, 2011

Subgenus Carabus Linnaeus, 1758

Carabus angustus Roeschke, 1898
Carabus arcensis Herbst, 1784
Carabus billbergi Mannerheim, 1827
Carabus cartereti Deuve, 1982
Carabus catenulatus Scopoli, 1763
Carabus cumanus Fischer von Waldheim, 1823
Carabus deyrollei Gory, 1839
Carabus goryi Dejean, 1831
Carabus granulatus Linnaeus, 1758
Carabus italicus Dejean, 1826
Carabus leplati Deuve & Li, 2008
Carabus manfredeggeri A.Müller, 2012
Carabus manifestus Kraatz, 1881
Carabus menetriesi Hummel, 1827
Carabus mianyangensis Deuve & Li, 1998
Carabus namhaedoensis Kwon & Lee, 1984
Carabus nitididorsus Ishikawa & Kim, 1983
Carabus obsoletus Sturm, 1815
Carabus paraysi Palliardi, 1825
Carabus pawlowskianus Deuve, 1989
Carabus pseudomanifestus Rapuzzi, 2009
Carabus sculpturatus Ménétriés, 1832
Carabus sternbergi Roeschke, 1898
Carabus stscheglowi Mannerheim, 1827
Carabus szeli Deuve, 1994
Carabus ulrichii Germar, 1823
Carabus vanvolxemi Putzeys, 1875
Carabus vinctus (Weber, 1801)
Carabus xiuyanensis Deuve & Li, 1998

Subgenus Cathaicus Bates, 1870
Carabus brandti Faldermann, 1835

Subgenus Cathoplius C.G.Thomson, 1875
Carabus aliai (Escalera, 1944)
Carabus asperatus (Dejean, 1826)
Carabus stenocephalus Lucas, 1866

Subgenus Cechenochilus Motschulsky, 1850
Carabus adangensis Gottwald, 1983
Carabus boeberi M.Adams, 1817
Carabus heydenianus (Starck, 1889)
Carabus kokujewi Semenov, 1898
Carabus lazorum Belousov & Zamotajlov, 1999

Subgenus Cechenotribax Semenov & Znojko, 1932
Carabus petri Semenov & Znojko, 1932

Subgenus Cephalornis Semenov, 1889
Carabus potanini (Semenov, 1887)

Subgenus Chaetocarabus C.G.Thomson, 1875
Carabus arcadicus Gistel, 1848
Carabus intricatus Linnaeus, 1760
Carabus krueperi (Reitter, 1896)
Carabus lefebvrei Dejean, 1826
Carabus merlini Schaum, 1861

Subgenus Chaetomelas C.G.Thomson, 1875
Carabus piochardi (Géhin, 1883)

Subgenus Chrysocarabus C.G.Thomson, 1875

Carabus auronitens Fabricius, 1792
Carabus basilicus Chevrolat, 1836
Carabus hispanus Fabricius, 1787
Carabus olympiae Sella, 1855
Carabus punctatoauratus Germar, 1823
Carabus rutilans Dejean, 1826
Carabus solieri Dejean, 1826
Carabus splendens Olivier, 1790
Carabus strasseri (Lauffer, 1905)

Subgenus Cratocarabus Reitter, 1896
Carabus gorodinskii Obydov, 1998
Carabus kryzhanovskii Bogachev, 1965
Carabus puer A.Morawitz, 1886

Subgenus Cratocechenus Reitter, 1896
Carabus akinini A.Morawitz, 1886
Carabus jacobsoni Semenov, 1908
Carabus ovtshinnikovi Gottwald, 1987
Carabus redikortzevi Semenov & Breuning, 1931
Carabus tshistjakovae Kabak, 2001
Carabus znojkoi Semenov & Breuning, 1931

Subgenus Cratocephalus Kirsch, 1859
Carabus balassogloi C.A.Dohrn, 1881
Carabus chan Breuning, 1932
Carabus cicatricosus Fischer von Waldheim, 1842
Carabus corrugis C.A.Dohrn, 1882
Carabus narinensis Csiki, 1927
Carabus solskyi (Ballion, 1878)

Subgenus Cratophyrtus Reitter, 1896
Carabus hauseri (Reitter in F.Hauser, 1894)
Carabus katajevi Gottwald, 1989
Carabus kaufmanni Solsky, 1874
Carabus nikolajevi Kabak, 1998
Carabus turcosinensis Mandl, 1955

Subgenus Cryptocarabus Reitter, 1896

Carabus iliensis Kabak, 1994
Carabus kadyrbekovi Kabak, 1994
Carabus lindemanni Ballion, 1878
Carabus merkensis Kabak, 1992
Carabus mullerellus Beheim & Breuning, 1943
Carabus munganasti Reitter, 1909
Carabus sacarum Kabak, 1998
Carabus sororius A.Morawitz, 1886
Carabus subparallelus Ballion, 1878
Carabus tsharynensis Kabak, 1994
Carabus turkestanus Breuning, 1928

Subgenus Ctenocarabus C.G.Thomson, 1875
Carabus galicianus Gory, 1839
Carabus melancholicus Fabricius, 1798

Subgenus Cupreocarabus Deuve, 1997

Carabus balangicus Cavazzuti, 2002
Carabus brezinai Deuve, 1994
Carabus concursans Deuve & Kalab, 2010
Carabus drahoslavae Brezina & Häckel, 2006
Carabus huangi Deuve, 1992
Carabus laevithorax Breuning, 1935
Carabus lixianensis Deuve, 1990
Carabus melii Cavazzuti & Rapuzzi, 2005
Carabus minimocupreus Deuve, 2003
Carabus miroslavi Deuve, 2000
Carabus mollardianus Deuve, 2016
Carabus pseudohuangi Deuve, 1995
Carabus quintus Cavazzuti & Rapuzzi, 2009
Carabus sackenioides Deuve, 1991
Carabus sculptior Deuve, 1992
Carabus siguniangensis Deuve, 1997
Carabus verecundus Deuve & Kalab, 2010
Carabus xichang Kleinfeld & Puchner, 2013
Carabus zhegushanus Cavazzuti & Rapuzzi, 2005

Subgenus Cychrostomus Reitter, 1896
Carabus anchocephalus Reitter, 1896
Carabus pseudoprosodes Semenov & Znojko, 1932

Subgenus Cyclocarabus Reitter, 1896

Carabus aulacocnemus Semenov, 1897
Carabus belousovi Kabak, 1992
Carabus brosciformis Semenov, 1897
Carabus karaterekensis Kalab, 1996
Carabus mniszechii Chaudoir, 1852
Carabus namanganensis Heyden, 1886
Carabus pseudolamprostus Kalab, 1996
Carabus pskemicus Deuve & Kalab, 1993
Carabus pullus Semenov & Znojko, 1932
Carabus zarudnyi Semenov & Znojko, 1932

Subgenus Damaster Kollar, 1836

Carabus augustus Bates, 1888
Carabus blaptoides (Kollar, 1836)
Carabus elysii J.Thomson, 1856
Carabus formosus Semenov, 1887
Carabus fruhstorferi (Roeschke, 1900)
Carabus gemmifer (Fairmaire, 1887)
Carabus guerryi Born, 1903
Carabus ignigena (G.Hauser, 1914)
Carabus ignimitella Bates, 1888
Carabus ishizukai Deuve & Ohshima, 1989
Carabus jankowskii (Oberthür, 1883)
Carabus kubani Deuve, 1990
Carabus lafossei Feisthamel, 1845
Carabus liianus Deuve, 2008
Carabus monilifer Tatum, 1847 [see former : Carabus smaragdinus Fischer, 1823]
Carabus nankotaizanus Kano, 1932
Carabus osawai Imura; Zhou & Su, 1999
Carabus principalis Bates, 1889
Carabus pustulifer Lucas, 1869

Subgenus Deroplectes Reitter, 1895
Carabus arcanus Semenov, 1898
Carabus dokhtouroffi Ganglbauer, 1887
Carabus klapperichianus Mandl, 1955
Carabus sphinx Reitter, 1895
Carabus staudingeri Ganglbauer, 1886

Subgenus Diocarabus Reitter, 1896

Carabus aurocinctus Motschulsky, 1844
Carabus beybienkoi Kryzhanovskij, 1973
Carabus caustomarginatus Imura & Mizusawa, 1994
Carabus chamissonis Fischer von Waldheim, 1820
Carabus dorogostaiskii Shilenkov, 1983
Carabus fraterculus Reitter, 1895
Carabus loschnikovii Fischer von Waldheim, 1823
Carabus lucepunctus Cavazzuti & Rapuzzi, 2005
Carabus massagetus Motschulsky, 1844
Carabus opaculus Putzeys, 1875
Carabus slovtzovi Mannerheim, 1849

Subgenus Eccoptolabrus Semenov, 1898
Carabus exiguus Semenov, 1898
Carabus sunwukong Imura, 1993

Subgenus Euleptocarabus Nakane, 1955
Carabus porrecticollis Bates, 1883

Subgenus Eupachys Chaudoir, 1857
Carabus acutithorax Deuve, 1989
Carabus glyptopterus Fischer von Waldheim, 1828

Subgenus Eurycarabus Géhin, 1876
Carabus faminii Dejean, 1826
Carabus favieri Fairmaire, 1859
Carabus genei Gené, 1839

Subgenus Fulgenticarabus Deuve & Li, 1998
Carabus flutschi Deuve & Li, 1998

Subgenus Gnathocarabus Deuve, 1991
Carabus kusnetzovi Semenov, 1903

Subgenus Goniocarabus Géhin, 1885
Carabus caerulans A.Morawitz, 1886
Carabus grombczewskii Semenov, 1891
Carabus gussakovskii Kryzhanovskij, 1971
Carabus perelloi Casale, 1979
Carabus sogdianus Semenov, 1898
Carabus stackelbergi Kryzhanovskij, 1971
Carabus tadzhikistanus Kryzhanovskij, 1968

Subgenus Hemicarabus Géhin, 1876
Carabus macleayi Dejean, 1826
Carabus nitens Linnaeus, 1758
Carabus serratus Say, 1823
Carabus tuberculosus Dejean, 1829

Subgenus Heterocarabus A.Morawitz, 1886
Carabus bischoffii Chaudoir, 1848
Carabus marietti Cristofori & Jan, 1837
Carabus muchei Breuning, 1961

Subgenus Homoeocarabus Reitter, 1896
Carabus maeander Fischer von Waldheim, 1820

Subgenus Hygrocarabus C.G.Thomson, 1875
Carabus nodulosus Creutzer, 1799
Carabus variolosus Fabricius, 1787

Subgenus Hypsocarabus Semenov, 1898
Carabus laotse Breuning, 1943
Carabus latro Semenov, 1898
Carabus mikhaili Deuve & Mourzine, 1997
Carabus qinlingensis Imura, 1993
Carabus taibaiensis Kleinfeld, 2001
Carabus tewoensis Deuve, 1992

Subgenus Imaibius Bates, 1889

Carabus anami (Ledoux, 1977)
Carabus baronii Heinertz, 1977
Carabus barysomus Bates, 1889
Carabus boysii Tatum, 1851
Carabus caschmirensis Kollar & L.Redtenbacher, 1844
Carabus cavifrons Mandl, 1974
Carabus dardiellus Bates, 1889
Carabus epipleuralis Semenov, 1907
Carabus erberi Heinz, 1983
Carabus gandharae Heinertz, 1978
Carabus gridellii Breuning, 1959
Carabus isabellae Lassalle, 1985
Carabus kaghanensis Heinertz, 1978
Carabus leepai Heinz, 1993
Carabus nouristani (Ledoux, 1977)
Carabus olafi Deuve & J.Schmidt, 2007
Carabus pachtoun (Ledoux, 1975)
Carabus piffli Mandl, 1961
Carabus rostianus Semenov, 1907
Carabus stoliczkanus Bates, 1878
Carabus wittmerorum Heinertz, 1978

Subgenus Iniopachus Solier, 1848
Carabus auriculatus Putzeys, 1872
Carabus pyrenaeus Audinet-Serville, 1821

Subgenus Ischnocarabus Kraatz, 1877
Carabus cychropalpus Peyron, 1858
Carabus tenuitarsis (Kraatz, 1877)

Subgenus Isiocarabus Reitter, 1896

Carabus dargei Deuve, 1988
Carabus fiduciarius J.Thomson, 1856
Carabus gressittianus Mandl, 1975
Carabus heterodynamus Deuve, 1991
Carabus hienfoungii J.Thomson, 1857
Carabus hunanicola Deuve & Yu, 1992
Carabus kiukiangensis Bates, 1888
Carabus miaorum Lassalle & Prunier, 1993
Carabus pseudohunanicola Deuve & Tian, 2009
Carabus pustululatus Deuve, 1993
Carabus strandiellus Breuning, 1934

Subgenus Lamprostus Motschulsky, 1866

Carabus calleyi Fischer von Waldheim, 1823
Carabus cylindricior Deuve, 1994
Carabus erenleriensis Schweiger, 1964
Carabus guycolasianus Deuve, 2001
Carabus hemprichii Dejean, 1826
Carabus ledouxi Deuve, 2001
Carabus punctatus Laporte, 1834
Carabus renardi Chaudoir, 1846
Carabus robustus E.Deyrolle, 1869
Carabus rostandianus Deuve, 2005
Carabus saulcyi Piochard de la Brûlerie, 1875
Carabus seroulibkin Cavazzuti, 2008
Carabus spinolae Cristofori & Jan, 1837
Carabus staveni Heinz, 2002
Carabus syrus Roeschke, 1898
Carabus torosus I.Frivaldszky von Frivald, 1835

Subgenus Leptocarabus Géhin, 1885

Carabus arboreus Lewis, 1882
Carabus harmandi Lapouge, 1909
Carabus hiurai Kamiyoshi & Mizoguchi, 1960
Carabus koreanus Reitter, 1895
Carabus kumagaii (Kimura & Komiya, 1974)
Carabus kyushuensis Nakane, 1961
Carabus marcilhaci Deuve, 1992
Carabus procerulus Chaudoir, 1862
Carabus seishinensis (Lapouge, 1932)
Carabus semiopacus Reitter, 1895
Carabus vogtianus Beheim & Breuning, 1943
Carabus yokoae Deuve, 1988

Subgenus Leptoplesius Reitter, 1898

Carabus dolini Deuve, 1992
Carabus dolonicus Obydov, 1996
Carabus horoshanensis Deuve, 2002
Carabus itshkibashi Kabak, 2004
Carabus kleinfeldorum Kabak & Putchkov, 1995
Carabus marquardti Reitter, 1898
Carabus merzbacheri G.Hauser, 1922
Carabus shokalskii Semenov & Breuning, 1931
Carabus subtilistriatus G.Hauser, 1922

Subgenus Limnocarabus Géhin, 1876
Carabus clatratus Linnaeus, 1760

Subgenus Lipaster Motschulsky, 1866
Carabus gordius Reitter, 1898
Carabus stjernvalli Mannerheim, 1830

Subgenus Macrothorax Chenu, 1851
Carabus aumontii Lucas, 1850
Carabus meurguesianus Ledoux, 1990
Carabus morbillosus Fabricius, 1792
Carabus planatus Chaudoir, 1843
Carabus rugosus Fabricius, 1792

Subgenus Meganebrius Kraatz, 1895

Carabus alanstivelli (Morvan, 1981)
Carabus arunensis Heinertz, 1980
Carabus deliae (Morvan, 1972)
Carabus dilatotarsalis Mandl, 1979
Carabus epsteini Heinertz, 1978
Carabus everesti Andrewes, 1929
Carabus franzi Mandl, 1974
Carabus granulatocostatus Mandl, 1965
Carabus indicus Fairmaire, 1889
Carabus kadoudali (Morvan, 1982)
Carabus koganae Colas, 1961
Carabus lebretae Colas, 1961
Carabus montreuili Deuve, 2003
Carabus pseudoharmandi Mandl, 1965
Carabus queinneci Deuve, 1983
Carabus quinlani Mandl, 1965
Carabus salpansis Deuve, 1984
Carabus santostamangi Deuve & J.Schmidt, 2017
Carabus scheibei Eidam, 1937
Carabus swatensis Heinertz, 1979
Carabus tamang Deuve, 1983
Carabus thudamensis Deuve & J.Schmidt, 2017
Carabus tuberculipennis Mandl, 1974
Carabus wallichii Hope, 1831

Subgenus Megodontoides Deuve, 1991
Carabus erwini Mandl, 1975
Carabus promachus Bates, 1891
Carabus qiangding Kleinfeld & Puchner, 2007
Carabus thibetanus Breuning, 1950

Subgenus Megodontus Solier, 1848

Carabus aurolimbatus Dejean, 1830
Carabus avinovi Semenov & Znojko, 1932
Carabus blakistoni Newman, 1858
Carabus bonvouloirii Chaudoir, 1863
Carabus caelatus Fabricius, 1801
Carabus croaticus Dejean, 1826
Carabus danilevskii Obydov, 1993
Carabus exaratus Quensel, 1806
Carabus germarii Sturm, 1815
Carabus imperialis Fischer von Waldheim, 1823
Carabus kantaikensis Géhin, 1885
Carabus kolbei Roeschke, 1897
Carabus leachii Fischer von Waldheim, 1823
Carabus obovatus Fischer von Waldheim, 1828
Carabus persianus Roeschke, 1896
Carabus planicollis Küster, 1846
Carabus purpurascens Fabricius, 1787
Carabus schoenherri Fischer von Waldheim, 1820
Carabus septemcarinatus Motschulsky, 1840
Carabus stroganowi Zoubkoff, 1837
Carabus tuvensis Shilenkov, 1996
Carabus vietinghoffii M.Adams, 1812
Carabus violaceus Linnaeus, 1758

Subgenus Mesocarabus C.G.Thomson, 1875
Carabus dufourii Dejean, 1829
Carabus lusitanicus Fabricius, 1801
Carabus problematicus Herbst, 1786
Carabus riffensis Fairmaire, 1872

Subgenus Microplectes Reitter, 1896
Carabus convallium (Starck, 1889)
Carabus riedelii Ménétriés, 1832

Subgenus Mimocarabus Géhin, 1876
Carabus elbursensis Breuning, 1946
Carabus khorasanensis Deuve, 1993
Carabus maurus (M.Adams, 1817)
Carabus pumilio Küster, 1846
Carabus roseni Reitter, 1897

Subgenus Morphocarabus Géhin, 1876

Carabus aeruginosus Fischer von Waldheim, 1820
Carabus brinevi Kabak, 2014
Carabus chaudoirii Gebler, 1847
Carabus excellens Fabricius, 1798
Carabus gebleri Fischer von Waldheim, 1817
Carabus henningi Fischer von Waldheim, 1817
Carabus hummelii Fischer von Waldheim, 1823
Carabus karpinskii Kryzhanovskij & Matveev, 1993
Carabus kollari Palliardi, 1825
Carabus kozhantschikowi Lutshnik, 1924
Carabus mestscherjakovi Lutshnik, 1924
Carabus michailovi Kabak, 1992
Carabus monilis Fabricius, 1792
Carabus odoratus Motschulsky, 1844
Carabus praecellens Palliardi, 1825
Carabus regalis Fischer von Waldheim, 1820
Carabus rothii Dejean, 1829
Carabus scheidleri Panzer, 1799
Carabus spasskianus Fischer von Waldheim, 1823
Carabus tarbagataicus Kraatz, 1878
Carabus venustus A.Morawitz, 1862
Carabus versicolor I.Frivaldszky von Frivald, 1835
Carabus wulffiusi A.Morawitz, 1862
Carabus zawadzkii Kraatz, 1854
Carabus zhubajie Imura, 1993

Subgenus Neoplectes Reitter, 1885

Carabus chaudoirianus Lapouge, 1909
Carabus iberus (Fischer von Waldheim, 1823)
Carabus lafertei Chaudoir, 1846
Carabus martviliensis Retezar & Djavelidze, 1992
Carabus mellyi Chaudoir, 1846
Carabus prunierianus Deuve, 2012
Carabus szekelyii Retezar, 2011
Carabus titarenkoi Zamotajlov & Fominykh, 2014

Subgenus Neoplesius Reitter, 1896

Carabus alexpuchneri Kleinfeld & Puchner, 2011
Carabus alpherakii Semenov, 1898
Carabus borodini Heinz, 1996
Carabus bruggeianus Deuve, 1992
Carabus chomae (Imura, 2002)
Carabus chuandonzicus (Imura, 2011)
Carabus danae Kalab, 1995
Carabus ditomoides Deuve, 1991
Carabus edacis Cavazzuti, 2006
Carabus glinkai Heinz, 1996
Carabus hummelioides Deuve, 1989
Carabus kamensis Semenov, 1903
Carabus kaznakovi Semenov & Znojko, 1932
Carabus kozloviellus Semenov & Znojko, 1932
Carabus lama Semenov, 1898
Carabus leptoplesioides Deuve, 1992
Carabus mouthiezianoides Deuve & Kalab, 1992
Carabus nanschanicus Semenov, 1898
Carabus noctivagus Deuve, 1992
Carabus panda Deuve, 1988
Carabus paulusi Kalab, 1995
Carabus pseudomarkamensis Deuve, 1992
Carabus puetzi Kleinfeld, 2000
Carabus sinotibeticola Mandl, 1975
Carabus takashimai Deuve & Imura, 1993
Carabus tsogoensis Deuve, 1997
Carabus wagae Fairmaire, 1882
Carabus wrzecionkoianus Deuve, 2007
Carabus yushuensis Deuve, 1991
Carabus zhangjieae Deuve & Li, 2020

Subgenus Nesaeocarabus Bedel, 1895
Carabus abbreviatus Brullé, 1835
Carabus coarctatus Brullé, 1836
Carabus faustus Brullé, 1836
Carabus gomerae A.Müller, 2004

Subgenus Ohomopterus Reitter, 1896

Carabus albrechti A.Morawitz, 1862
Carabus arrowianus Breuning, 1934
Carabus chugokuensis (Nakane, 1961)
Carabus daisen (Nakane, 1953)
Carabus dehaanii Chaudoir, 1848
Carabus esakii Csiki, 1927
Carabus insulicola Chaudoir, 1869
Carabus iwawakianus (Nakane, 1953)
Carabus japonicus Motschulsky, 1858
Carabus kimurai (Ishikawa, 1966)
Carabus komiyai (Ishikawa, 1966)
Carabus lewisianus Nakane, 1953
Carabus maiyasanus Bates, 1873
Carabus sue Imura, 2012
Carabus uenoi (Ishikawa, 1960)
Carabus yaconinus Bates, 1873
Carabus yamato (Nakane, 1953)

Subgenus Ophiocarabus Reitter, 1896

Carabus aeneolus A.Morawitz, 1886
Carabus arshanicus Kabak, 2005
Carabus ballionis Kraatz, 1879
Carabus confinis Semenov, 1888
Carabus ernsti Kabak, 2001
Carabus imperfectus Semenov, 1887
Carabus iteratus Breuning, 1934
Carabus juldusanus Breuning, 1933
Carabus kalabellus Deuve, 1993
Carabus kurdaiensis Kabak, 2016
Carabus latiballioni Deuve, 1993
Carabus politulus A.Morawitz, 1886
Carabus praecox Semenov, 1898
Carabus regeli A.Morawitz, 1886
Carabus rufocuprescens Deuve, 1993
Carabus successor Reitter, 1896
Carabus tekesensis Deuve & Tian, 2004
Carabus variabilis Ballion, 1878
Carabus wusunshanicus Kabak, 2015

Subgenus Oreocarabus Géhin, 1876
Carabus ghilianii LaFerté-Sénectère, 1847
Carabus guadarramus LaFerté-Sénectère, 1847
Carabus luetgensi Beuthin, 1886
Carabus reitterianus Breuning, 1932

Subgenus Orinocarabus Kraatz, 1878

Carabus alpestris Sturm, 1815
Carabus bertolinii (Kraatz, 1878)
Carabus bremii Stierlin, 1881
Carabus carinthiacus Sturm, 1815
Carabus castanopterus A. & G.B.Villa, 1833
Carabus concolor Fabricius, 1792
Carabus fairmairei C.G.Thomson, 1875
Carabus linnei Panzer, 1810
Carabus pedemontanus Ganglbauer, 1891
Carabus sylvestris Panzer, 1793

Subgenus Oxycarabus Semenov, 1898
Carabus saphyrinus Cristofori & Jan, 1837

Subgenus Pachycarabus Géhin, 1876
Carabus imitator Reitter, 1883
Carabus koenigi Ganglbauer, 1887
Carabus roseri Faldermann, 1836
Carabus staehlini M.Adams, 1817
Carabus swaneticus Reitter, 1883

Subgenus Pachystus Motschulsky, 1866

Carabus cavernosus I.Frivaldszky von Frivald, 1838
Carabus cribratus Quensel, 1806
Carabus gemellatus Ménétriés, 1832
Carabus glabratus Paykull, 1790
Carabus graecus Dejean, 1826
Carabus hortensis Linnaeus, 1758
Carabus hungaricus Fabricius, 1792
Carabus morio Mannerheim, 1830
Carabus pisidicus (Peyron, 1855)
Carabus preslii Dejean, 1830
Carabus tamsii Ménétriés, 1832

Subgenus Pagocarabus A.Morawitz, 1886

Carabus caelestinus (Imura, 2007)
Carabus crassesculptus Kraatz, 1881
Carabus draco Brezina, 1999
Carabus hengduanicola Deuve, 1996
Carabus ludmilae Deuve, 1992
Carabus sichuanicola Deuve, 1989
Carabus trachynodes Bates, 1891
Carabus tryznai Brezina & Häckel, 2006

Subgenus Pantophyrtus Thieme, 1881

Carabus alajensis Semenov, 1897
Carabus brachypedilus A.Morawitz, 1886
Carabus debilis Semenov, 1897
Carabus evstigneevi Obydov, 1997
Carabus ferghanicus Breuning, 1933
Carabus longipedatus Belousov & Kabak, 1993
Carabus turcomanorum (Thieme, 1881)
Carabus validus (Kraatz, 1884)

Subgenus Piocarabus Reitter, 1896

Carabus blumenthaliellus Deuve, 1988
Carabus choui Deuve, 1989
Carabus kitawakianus Imura, 1993
Carabus nanwutai Kleinfeld; Korell & Wrase, 1996
Carabus ohshimaianus Deuve, 1988
Carabus sui Imura & Zhou, 1998
Carabus titanus Breuning, 1933
Carabus vladsimirskyi Dejean, 1830

Subgenus Platycarabus A.Morawitz, 1886
Carabus creutzeri Fabricius, 1801
Carabus cychroides Baudi di Selve, 1864
Carabus depressus Bonelli, 1810
Carabus fabricii Panzer, 1810
Carabus irregularis Fabricius, 1792

Subgenus Procerus Dejean, 1821
Carabus bulgharmaadensis (E.Bodemeyer, 1915)
Carabus caucasicus M.Adams, 1817
Carabus elbursianus Mandl, 1958
Carabus gigas Creutzer, 1799
Carabus scabrosus Olivier, 1790
Carabus syriacus (Kollar in L.Redtenbacher, 1843)

Subgenus Procrustes Bonelli, 1810

Carabus anatolicus (Chaudoir, 1857)
Carabus banonii Dejean, 1829
Carabus chevrolati Cristofori & Jan, 1837
Carabus clypeatus M.Adams, 1817
Carabus coriaceus Linnaeus, 1758
Carabus hybridus (Ganglbauer, 1887)
Carabus mulsantianus A.Morawitz, 1886
Carabus paiafa White, 1845
Carabus talychensis (Ménétriés, 1832)

Subgenus Pseudocoptolabrus Reitter, 1896

Carabus armiger Imura, 1997
Carabus belousovianus (Imura, 2011)
Carabus branaungi Imura, 1999
Carabus burmanensis Breuning, 1932
Carabus businskyi Deuve, 1990
Carabus chortenensis Cavazzuti, 2005
Carabus firmatus Cavazzuti, 1997
Carabus masahiroi (Imura, 2006)
Carabus nosei Imura, 1997
Carabus pseudochortenensis Deuve & Tian, 2020
Carabus taliensis (Fairmaire, 1886)
Carabus watanabei (Imura, 2003)

Subgenus Pseudocranion Reitter, 1896

Carabus aba Kalab, 2002
Carabus absonus Cavazzuti & Rapuzzi, 2005
Carabus baxianus Cavazzuti & Rapuzzi, 2007
Carabus brachygnathus Deuve, 2002
Carabus flavigenua Cavazzuti, 2002
Carabus fumigatus Semenov, 1898
Carabus gansuensis Semenov, 1887
Carabus gonggaicus Deuve, 1989
Carabus jiudingensis Deuve, 1994
Carabus kitawakiellus Imura, 1995
Carabus labrangicus Deuve, 1992
Carabus lazikouensis Deuve, 1997
Carabus meditabundus Deuve, 1992
Carabus pseudosackeni Deuve, 1989
Carabus sackeni Semenov, 1898
Carabus shuamaluko Deuve, 1991
Carabus sinicus Breuning, 1950
Carabus taibaishanicus Deuve, 1989
Carabus tibetanophilus Deuve, 1991
Carabus viatorum Deuve, 1992
Carabus wenxianicola Deuve, 1996
Carabus zhanglaensis Deuve, 1991

Subgenus Rhigocarabus Reitter, 1896

Carabus allegroi Cavazzuti & Rapuzzi, 2007
Carabus batangicoides Deuve & Tian, 2011
Carabus boanoi Cavazzuti, 2003
Carabus broukpytlik Brezina & Häckel, 2004
Carabus buddaicus Semenov, 1887
Carabus casanova (Imura & Brezina, 2008)
Carabus cateniger A.Morawitz, 1886
Carabus cechenoides Deuve & Kalab, 2014
Carabus dacatraianus Deuve, 1995
Carabus dubifer Deuve & Kalab, 2014
Carabus dungchen Deuve & Kalab, 2019
Carabus fubianensis Deuve & Kalab, 2007
Carabus gentleman Brezina & Häckel, 2004
Carabus gigolo Heinz & Brezina, 1996
Carabus gigoloides Cavazzuti, 2000
Carabus gracilicollis Semenov, 1887
Carabus handelmazzettii Mandl, 1955
Carabus humilior Deuve & Kalab, 2012
Carabus impavidus Cavazzuti, 2008
Carabus indigestus Semenov, 1898
Carabus itzingeri (Breuning, 1934)
Carabus jintangicus Deuve, 2001
Carabus jiulongensis Deuve, 1994
Carabus ladygini Semenov, 1903
Carabus legrandianus Deuve & Tian, 2007
Carabus maleki Deuve, 1991
Carabus mifan Kalab, 2005
Carabus morawitzianus Semenov, 1887
Carabus nianjuaensis Imura, 2016
Carabus paraxiei Kleinfeld & Puchner, 2013
Carabus pepek (Imura & Kalab, 2006)
Carabus poeta Semenov, 1898
Carabus propiorthais Cavazzuti, 2000
Carabus pseudopusio Deuve, 1996
Carabus pusioides Cavazzuti & Rapuzzi, 2007
Carabus quindecim Cavazzuti, 2002
Carabus rhododendron Deuve & Imura, 1991
Carabus roborowskii Semenov, 1887
Carabus sehnali Brezina & Häckel, 2006
Carabus shaluishan Kleinfeld & Puchner, 2011
Carabus sininensis Semenov, 1898
Carabus thais Heinz, 1997
Carabus turnai Deuve, 1994
Carabus wengdaensis Kleinfeld & Puchner, 2009
Carabus xiei Deuve, 1992

Subgenus Scambocarabus Reitter, 1896
Carabus auritus Cavazzuti, 2000
Carabus kruberi Fischer von Waldheim, 1820
Carabus modestulus Semenov, 1887
Carabus sculptipennis Chaudoir, 1877
Carabus shaanxiensis Deuve, 1991

Subgenus Semnocarabus Reitter, 1896

Carabus carbonicolor A.Morawitz, 1886
Carabus cicatricosulus A.Morawitz, 1886
Carabus erosus Motschulsky, 1866
Carabus perminimus Deuve, 1994
Carabus regulus C.A.Dohrn, 1882
Carabus rustemi Kabak, 2010
Carabus tekeliensis Kabak, 2001
Carabus transiliensis Semenov, 1897

Subgenus Shunichiocarabus Imura, 1995
Carabus uenoianus Imura, 1995

Subgenus Sphodristocarabus Géhin, 1885

Carabus adamsi M.Adams, 1817
Carabus biroi Csiki, 1927
Carabus bohemani Ménétriés, 1832
Carabus coruhnehriensis Cavazzuti, 1990
Carabus elegantulus Motschulsky, 1850
Carabus enigmaticus Heinz, 1980
Carabus georgia Cavazzuti, 1984
Carabus gilnickii E.Deyrolle, 1869
Carabus heinzi Breuning, 1964
Carabus karasudominus Cavazzuti, 1991
Carabus kurdicus Heinz, 1975
Carabus macrogonus Chaudoir, 1847
Carabus pavesii Cavazzuti, 1992
Carabus scovitzii Faldermann, 1836
Carabus separatus Lapouge, 1907
Carabus tokatensis Roeschke, 1898
Carabus varians Fischer von Waldheim, 1823

Subgenus Stephanocarabus Imura, 1995
Carabus fraterculoides Breuning, 1961

Subgenus Tachypus Weber, 1801
Carabus auratus Linnaeus, 1760
Carabus cancellatus Illiger, 1798
Carabus vagans Olivier, 1795

Subgenus Tanaocarabus Reitter, 1896
Carabus finitimus Haldeman, 1852
Carabus forreri Bates, 1882
Carabus hendrichsi Bolivar y Pieltain; Rotger & Coronado, 1967
Carabus sylvosus Say, 1823
Carabus taedatus Fabricius, 1787

Subgenus Teratocarabus Semenov & Znojko, 1932
Carabus azrael Semenov & Znojko, 1932

Subgenus Tmesicarabus Reitter, 1896
Carabus cristoforii Spence, 1833

Subgenus Tomocarabus Reitter, 1896
Carabus bessarabicus Fischer von Waldheim, 1823
Carabus convexus Fabricius, 1775
Carabus decolor Fischer von Waldheim, 1823
Carabus marginalis Fabricius, 1794
Carabus rumelicus Chaudoir, 1867
Carabus scabripennis Chaudoir, 1850

Subgenus Trachycarabus Géhin, 1876

Carabus besseri Fischer von Waldheim, 1820
Carabus coriaceipennis Chaudoir, 1863
Carabus estreicheri Fischer von Waldheim, 1820
Carabus latreillei Fischer von Waldheim, 1820
Carabus mandibularis Fischer von Waldheim, 1828
Carabus perrini Dejean, 1831
Carabus planarius Obydov, 1994
Carabus scabriusculus Olivier, 1795
Carabus sibiricus Fischer von Waldheim, 1820

Subgenus Tribax Fischer von Waldheim, 1817

Carabus adelphus (Rost, 1892)
Carabus agnatus (Ganglbauer, 1889)
Carabus apollo (Zolotarev, 1913)
Carabus apschuanus (Rost, 1893)
Carabus balkaricus Belousov & Abdurakhmanov, 1991
Carabus biebersteini Ménétriés, 1832
Carabus certus (Reitter, 1896)
Carabus circassicus (Ganglbauer, 1886)
Carabus compressus Chaudoir, 1846
Carabus curlettii Cavazzuti, 1984
Carabus daphnis Kurnakov, 1962
Carabus edithae Reitter, 1893
Carabus edmundi Semenov, 1897
Carabus jason Semenov, 1898
Carabus kasakorum Semenov, 1897
Carabus kasbekianus Kraatz, 1877
Carabus koltzei (Rost, 1889)
Carabus komarowi Reitter, 1882
Carabus kraatzi Chaudoir, 1877
Carabus kratkyi Ganglbauer, 1891
Carabus lailensis Belousov, 1992
Carabus lederi Reitter, 1882
Carabus macropus Chaudoir, 1877
Carabus merdeniki Cavazzuti & Korell, 1992
Carabus nothus M.Adams, 1817
Carabus osseticus M.Adams, 1817
Carabus plasoni (Ganglbauer, 1886)
Carabus polychrous (Rost, 1892)
Carabus prometheus Reitter, 1887
Carabus protensus Schaum, 1864
Carabus puschkini M.Adams, 1817
Carabus reitteri (Retowski, 1885)
Carabus satyrus Kurnakov, 1962
Carabus schamylii Hampe, 1852
Carabus shtchurovi Belousov & Zamotajlov, 1993
Carabus starcki (Heyden, 1885)
Carabus starckianus (Ganglbauer, 1886)
Carabus titan (Zolotarev, 1913)

Subgenus Ulocarabus Reitter, 1896
Carabus stschurowskii Solsky, 1874
Carabus theanus Reitter, 1895

Extinct, not assigned to subgenus

†Carabus ceresti Nel, 1987
†Carabus dzieduszyckii Lomnicki, 1894
†Carabus elongatus Brodie, 1845
†Carabus foveolatus Piton & Theobald, 1935
†Carabus jeffersoni Scudder, 1900
†Carabus maeandroides Lomnicki, 1894
†Carabus mecothoracus Zhang: Liu & Shangguan, 1989
†Carabus neli Deuve, 1998
†Carabus novalensis Omboni, 1886
†Carabus ovalis Hong & Wang, 1986
†Carabus praearvensis Lomnicki, 1894
†Carabus praeviolaceus Lomnicki, 1894
†Carabus westwoodii Giebel, 1856
†Carabus winkleri Weyenbergh, 1869
