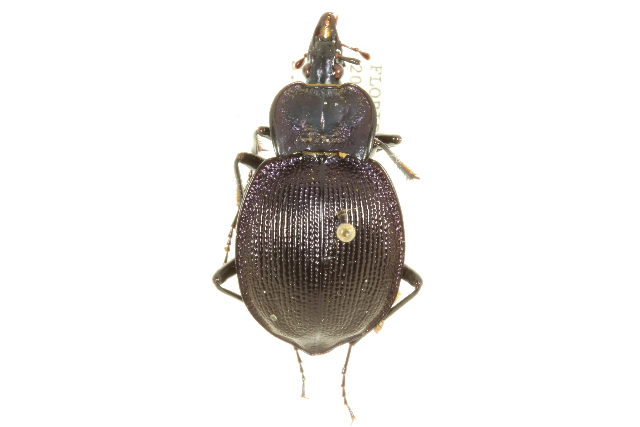

Scientific classification
- Kingdom: Animalia
- Phylum: Arthropoda
- Clade: Pancrustacea
- Class: Insecta
- Order: Coleoptera
- Suborder: Adephaga
- Family: Carabidae
- Genus: Scaphinotus
- Species: S. unicolor

Binomial name
- Scaphinotus unicolor (Fabricius, 1787)

Synonyms
- Carabus unicolor Fabricius, 1787; Scaphinotus hunteri Crotch, 1871; Scaphinotus grandis Gistel, 1857; Scaphinotus heros T.W. Harris, 1839; Scaphinotus shoemakeri Leng, 1914; Scaphinotus elevatus floridanus Leng, 1915

= Scaphinotus unicolor =

Species of beetle

Scaphinotus unicolor, the one-color snail-eating beetle, is a species of ground beetle in the family Carabidae. It is found in North America (Alabama, Arkansas, District of Columbia, Florida, Georgia, Indiana, Kentucky, Maryland, Missouri, Mississippi, Ohio, Pennsylvania, South Carolina, Tennessee, Virginia), where it inhabits forests, often along streams and near springs.

Adults are brachypterous and nocturnal.

== Subspecies ==
These four subspecies belong to the species Scaphinotus unicolor:

- Scaphinotus unicolor floridanus Leng, 1915
- Scaphinotus unicolor heros T.W.Harris, 1839
- Scaphinotus unicolor shoemakeri Leng, 1914
- Scaphinotus unicolor unicolor (Fabricius, 1787)
