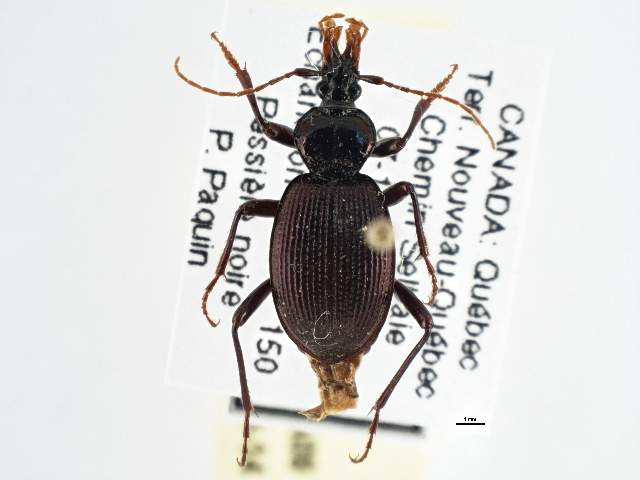

Scientific classification
- Kingdom: Animalia
- Phylum: Arthropoda
- Clade: Pancrustacea
- Class: Insecta
- Order: Coleoptera
- Suborder: Adephaga
- Family: Carabidae
- Genus: Scaphinotus
- Species: S. bilobus

Binomial name
- Scaphinotus bilobus (Say, 1823)

Synonyms
- Cychrus bilobus Say, 1823

= Scaphinotus bilobus =

Species of beetle

Scaphinotus bilobus, the bilobed snail-eating beetle, is a species of ground beetle in the family Carabidae. It is found in North America (Manitoba, New Brunswick, Nova Scotia, Ontario, Quebec, Illinois, Kansas, Massachusetts, Maine, Michigan, Minnesota, Missouri, Nebraska, New Hampshire, New York, Ohio, Vermont, Wisconsin), where it inhabits coniferous and mixed forests, often along rivers and lakes.

Adults are brachypterous and nocturnal. They prey on snails.
