= Scaphinotus johnsoni =

Scientific classification
- Kingdom: Animalia
- Phylum: Arthropoda
- Clade: Pancrustacea
- Class: Insecta
- Order: Coleoptera
- Suborder: Adephaga
- Family: Carabidae
- Genus: Scaphinotus
- Species: S. johnsoni

Binomial name
- Scaphinotus johnsoni Van Dyke, 1924

Synonyms
- Scaphinotus klahowyae Perrault, 1973

Species of beetle

Scaphinotus johnsoni, Johnson's snail-eating beetle, is a species of ground beetle in the family Carabidae. It is found in North America (British Columbia, Washington), where it inhabits Tsuga forests and the subalpine zone in the Olympic Temperate Rainforest.

Adults are brachypterous, gregarious and nocturnal.
