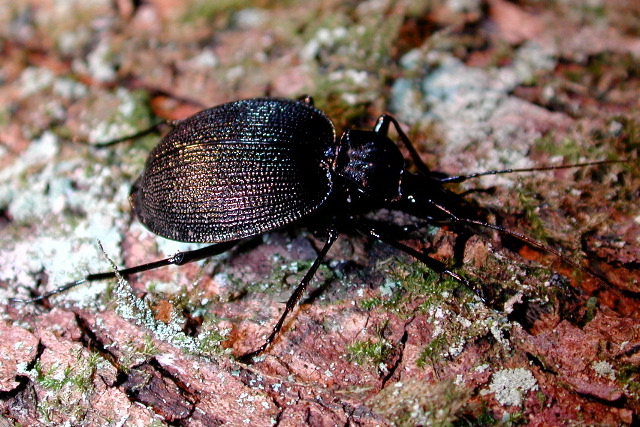

Scientific classification
- Kingdom: Animalia
- Phylum: Arthropoda
- Clade: Pancrustacea
- Class: Insecta
- Order: Coleoptera
- Suborder: Adephaga
- Family: Carabidae
- Genus: Scaphinotus
- Species: S. guyotii

Binomial name
- Scaphinotus guyotii (LeConte, 1863)

Synonyms
- Cychrus guyotii LeConte, 1863; Scaphinotus confusus Darlington, 1932; Cychrus angelli Beutenmüller, 1918

= Scaphinotus guyotii =

Species of beetle

Scaphinotus guyotii, Guyot's snail-eating beetle, is a species of ground beetle in the family Carabidae. It is found in North America (North Carolina, Tennessee, Virginia, West Virginia), where it inhabits coniferous forests (at higher altitudes) and mixed and deciduous forests (at lower altitudes).

Adults are brachypterous and nocturnal. They prey on snails,
