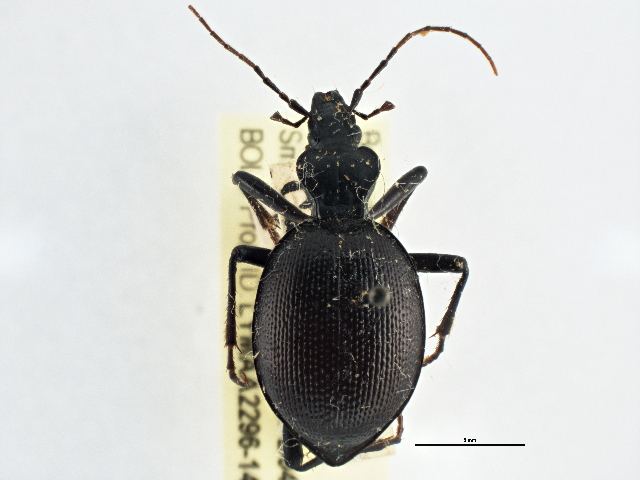

Scientific classification
- Kingdom: Animalia
- Phylum: Arthropoda
- Clade: Pancrustacea
- Class: Insecta
- Order: Coleoptera
- Suborder: Adephaga
- Family: Carabidae
- Genus: Scaphinotus
- Species: S. punctatus

Binomial name
- Scaphinotus punctatus (LeConte, 1859)

Synonyms
- Cychrus punctatus LeConte, 1859; Brennus catenulatus Casey, 1897; Brennus gravidus Casey, 1897; Cychrus mimus G.Horn, 1874

= Scaphinotus punctatus =

Species of beetle

Scaphinotus punctatus, the punctate snail-eating beetle, is a species of ground beetles in the family Carabidae. It is found in Central America and North America (Baja California and California), where it inhabits forests. It is found along lake shores and streams, as well as in dry fields.

Adults are brachypterous and nocturnal. They have been recorded feeding on snails, caterpillars (both living and dead), berries, as well as other beetles.
