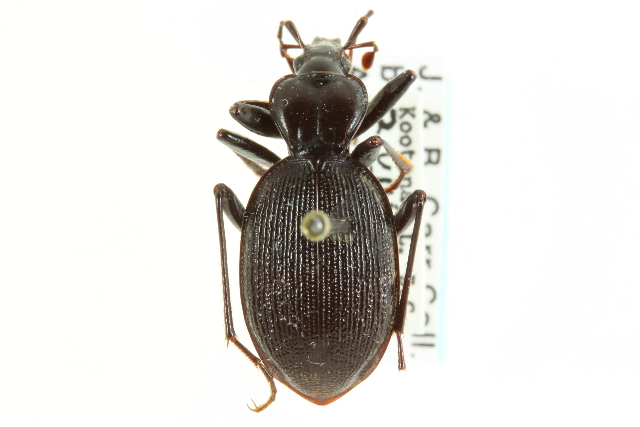

Scientific classification
- Kingdom: Animalia
- Phylum: Arthropoda
- Clade: Pancrustacea
- Class: Insecta
- Order: Coleoptera
- Suborder: Adephaga
- Family: Carabidae
- Genus: Scaphinotus
- Species: S. relictus

Binomial name
- Scaphinotus relictus (G.Horn, 1881)

Synonyms
- Cychrus relictus G.Horn, 1881

= Scaphinotus relictus =

Species of beetle

Scaphinotus relictus, rilictual snail-eating beetle, is a species of beetle of the Carabidae family. This species is found in North America (Alberta, British Columbia, California, Idaho, Montana, Washington), where it inhabits deciduous, mixed and coniferous forests.

Adults are brachypterous and nocturnal.
