= Scaphinotus interruptus =

Scientific classification
- Kingdom: Animalia
- Phylum: Arthropoda
- Clade: Pancrustacea
- Class: Insecta
- Order: Coleoptera
- Suborder: Adephaga
- Family: Carabidae
- Genus: Scaphinotus
- Species: S. interruptus

Binomial name
- Scaphinotus interruptus (Ménétriés, 1843)

Synonyms
- Cychrus interruptus Ménétriés, 1843; Brennus beringi Casey, 1920; Brennus parvulicollis Casey, 1920; Brennus procerus Casey, 1920; Brennus integer Casey, 1914; Brennus corpulentus Casey, 1897; Brennus politus Casey, 1897; Brennus sinuatus Casey, 1897; Cychrus dissolutus Schaum, 1863; Cychrus constrictus LeConte, 1853

Species of beetle

Scaphinotus interruptus, Ménétriés' snail-eating beetle, is a species of ground beetle in the family Carabidae ("ground beetles"), in the suborder Adephaga ("ground and water beetles"). It is found in North America, in mountains and foothills of California and Oregon.

Adults are brachypterous. They are black with narrow heads and wide elytra. They can reach 13–20 millimetres (0.51–0.79 in) in length.
