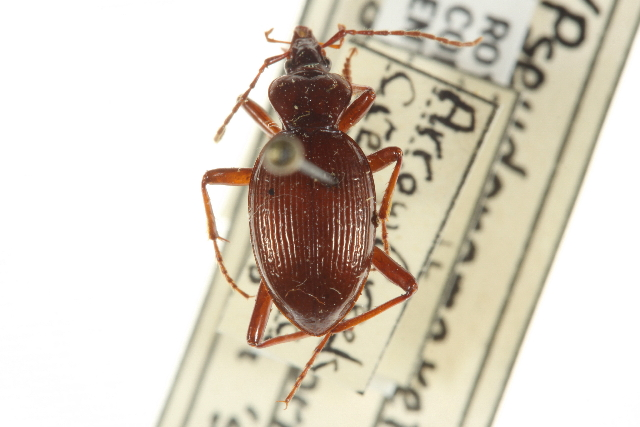

Scientific classification
- Kingdom: Animalia
- Phylum: Arthropoda
- Clade: Pancrustacea
- Class: Insecta
- Order: Coleoptera
- Suborder: Adephaga
- Family: Carabidae
- Genus: Scaphinotus
- Species: S. merkelii

Binomial name
- Scaphinotus merkelii (G.Horn, 1890)

Synonyms
- Cychrus merkelii G.Horn, 1890; Cychrus idahoensis Webb, 1901

= Scaphinotus merkelii =

Species of beetle

Scaphinotus merkelii, Merkel's snail-eating beetle, is a species of beetle of the Carabidae family. This species is found in North America (British Columbia, Idaho, Montana), where it inhabits mixed forests.

Adults are brachypterous and nocturnal.
