= Scaphinotus crenatus =

Scientific classification
- Kingdom: Animalia
- Phylum: Arthropoda
- Clade: Pancrustacea
- Class: Insecta
- Order: Coleoptera
- Suborder: Adephaga
- Family: Carabidae
- Genus: Scaphinotus
- Species: S. crenatus

Binomial name
- Scaphinotus crenatus (Motschulsky, 1859)

Synonyms
- Cychrus crenatus Motschulsky, 1859; Brennus montereyensis Casey, 1920; Brennus productus Casey, 1914; Brennus gentilis Casey, 1897; Cychrus striatus LeConte, 1859

Species of beetle

Scaphinotus crenatus, the notched snail-eating beetle, is a species of beetle of the Carabidae family. This species is found in the United States (California), where it inhabits forests.

Adults are brachypterous and nocturnal.
