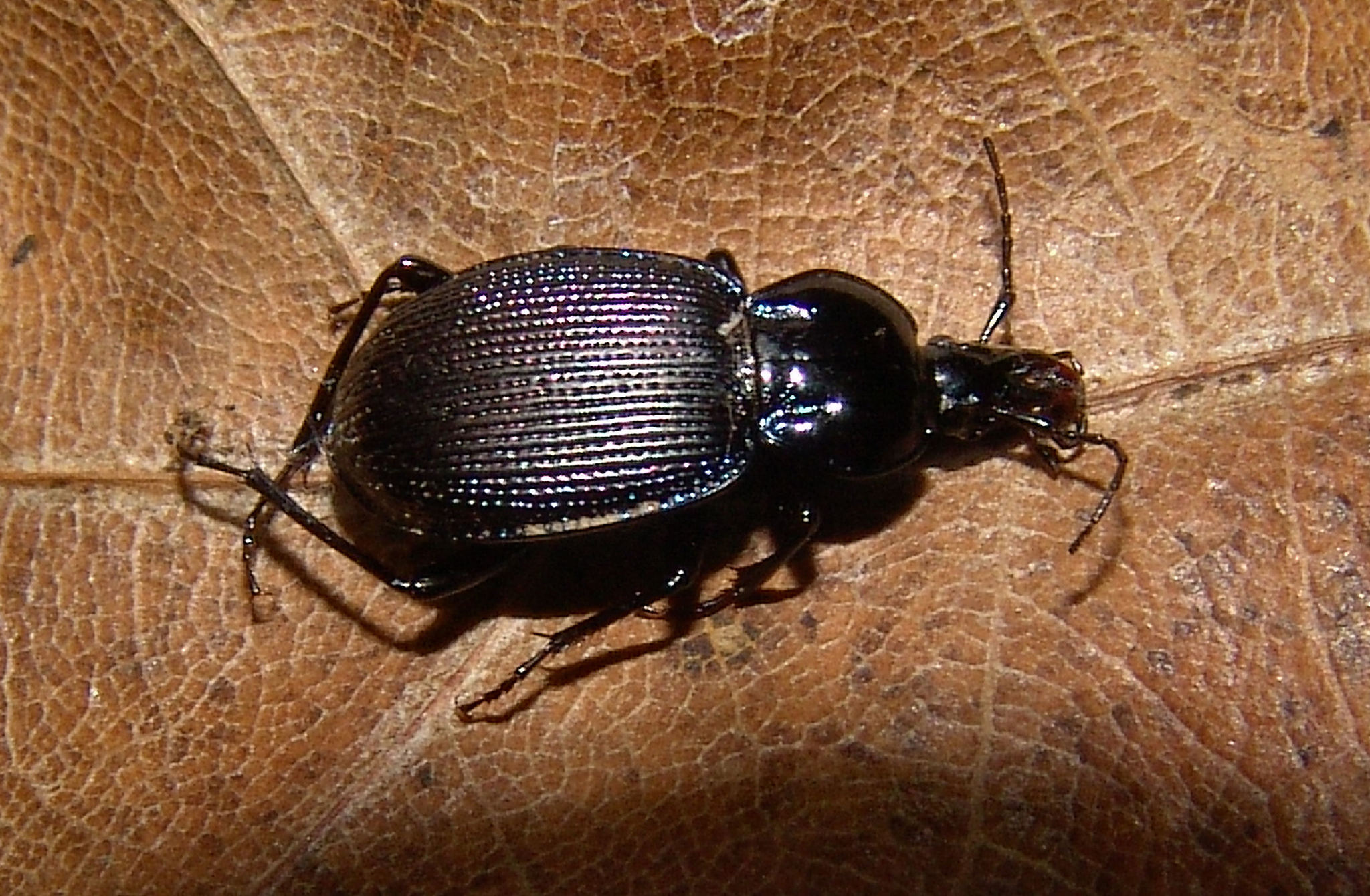

Scientific classification
- Domain: Eukaryota
- Kingdom: Animalia
- Phylum: Arthropoda
- Class: Insecta
- Order: Coleoptera
- Suborder: Adephaga
- Family: Carabidae
- Genus: Sphaeroderus
- Species: S. indianae

Binomial name
- Sphaeroderus indianae (Blatchley, 1910)

Synonyms
- Cychrus indianae Blatchley, 1910

= Sphaeroderus indianae =

Species of beetle

Sphaeroderus indianae, the Indiana false snail-eating beetle, is a species of ground beetle in the family Carabidae. It is found in North America (Indiana, Kentucky, Ohio, Tennessee, Virginia, West Virginia), where it inhabits forests.

Adults are brachypterous.
