= Scaphinotus vandykei =

Scientific classification
- Kingdom: Animalia
- Phylum: Arthropoda
- Clade: Pancrustacea
- Class: Insecta
- Order: Coleoptera
- Suborder: Adephaga
- Family: Carabidae
- Genus: Scaphinotus
- Species: S. vandykei

Binomial name
- Scaphinotus vandykei Roeschke, 1907

Synonyms
- Scaphinotus fuchsi Roeschke, 1907

Species of beetle

Scaphinotus vandykei, Van Dyke's snail-eating beetle, is a species of ground beetle in the family Carabidae. It is found in North America (Arizona), where it inhabits coniferous forests, often in areas near water bodies.

Adults are brachypterous and nocturnal.
