= Scaphinotus subtilis =

Scientific classification
- Kingdom: Animalia
- Phylum: Arthropoda
- Clade: Pancrustacea
- Class: Insecta
- Order: Coleoptera
- Suborder: Adephaga
- Family: Carabidae
- Genus: Scaphinotus
- Species: S. subtilis

Binomial name
- Scaphinotus subtilis (Schaum, 1863)

Synonyms
- Cychrus subtilis Schaum, 1863

Species of beetle

Scaphinotus subtilis, the slender snail-eating beetle, is a species of ground beetle in the family Carabidae. It is found in North America (California), where it may be found near bodies of water.

Adults are brachypterous and nocturnal.
