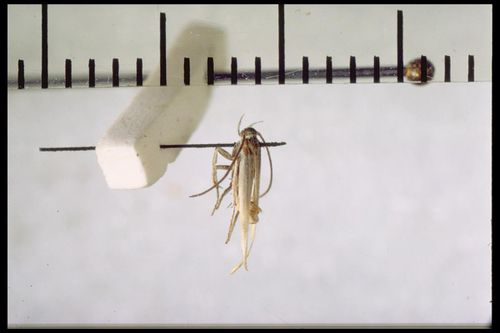
- Holotype

Scientific classification
- Kingdom: Animalia
- Phylum: Arthropoda
- Class: Insecta
- Order: Lepidoptera
- Family: Elachistidae
- Genus: Elachista
- Species: E. hookeri

Binomial name
- Elachista hookeri (Dugdale, 1971)

Synonyms
- Irenicodes hookeri Dugdale, 1971

= Elachista hookeri =

Species of moth

Elachista hookeri is a moth in the family Elachistidae. It was described by John S. Dugdale in 1971. It is found in New Zealand, where it has been recorded from the Auckland Islands.

The species has brachypterous males and females.
