= Scaphinotus cordatus =

Scientific classification
- Kingdom: Animalia
- Phylum: Arthropoda
- Clade: Pancrustacea
- Class: Insecta
- Order: Coleoptera
- Suborder: Adephaga
- Family: Carabidae
- Genus: Scaphinotus
- Species: S. cordatus

Binomial name
- Scaphinotus cordatus (LeConte, 1853)

Synonyms
- Cychrus cordatus LeConte, 1853; Brennus rufitarsis Casey, 1920; Brennus vernicatus Casey, 1920

Species of beetle

Scaphinotus cordatus, the hearth-shaped thorax snail-eating beetle, is a species of ground beetle in the family Carabidae. It is found in North America (California), where it inhabits coastal mixed forests.

Adults are brachypterous.
