= Scaphinotus macrogonus =

Scientific classification
- Kingdom: Animalia
- Phylum: Arthropoda
- Clade: Pancrustacea
- Class: Insecta
- Order: Coleoptera
- Suborder: Adephaga
- Family: Carabidae
- Genus: Scaphinotus
- Species: S. macrogonus

Binomial name
- Scaphinotus macrogonus Bates, 1891

Synonyms
- Scaphinotus horni Van Dyke, 1938

Species of beetle

Scaphinotus macrogonus, Bates' snail-eating beetle, is a species of beetle of the Carabidae family. This species is found in Mexico (Durango), where it inhabits midland to mountainous areas.

Adults are brachypterous.
