= Scaphinotus unistriatus =

Scientific classification
- Kingdom: Animalia
- Phylum: Arthropoda
- Clade: Pancrustacea
- Class: Insecta
- Order: Coleoptera
- Suborder: Adephaga
- Family: Carabidae
- Genus: Scaphinotus
- Species: S. unistriatus

Binomial name
- Scaphinotus unistriatus (Darlington, 1932)

Synonyms
- Nomaretus unistriatus Darlington, 1932

Species of beetle

Scaphinotus unistriatus, the one-lined snail-eating beetle, is a species of beetle of the Carabidae family. This species is found in North America (North Carolina), where it inhabits mixed forests, often along slopes.

Adults are brachypterous and nocturnal.
