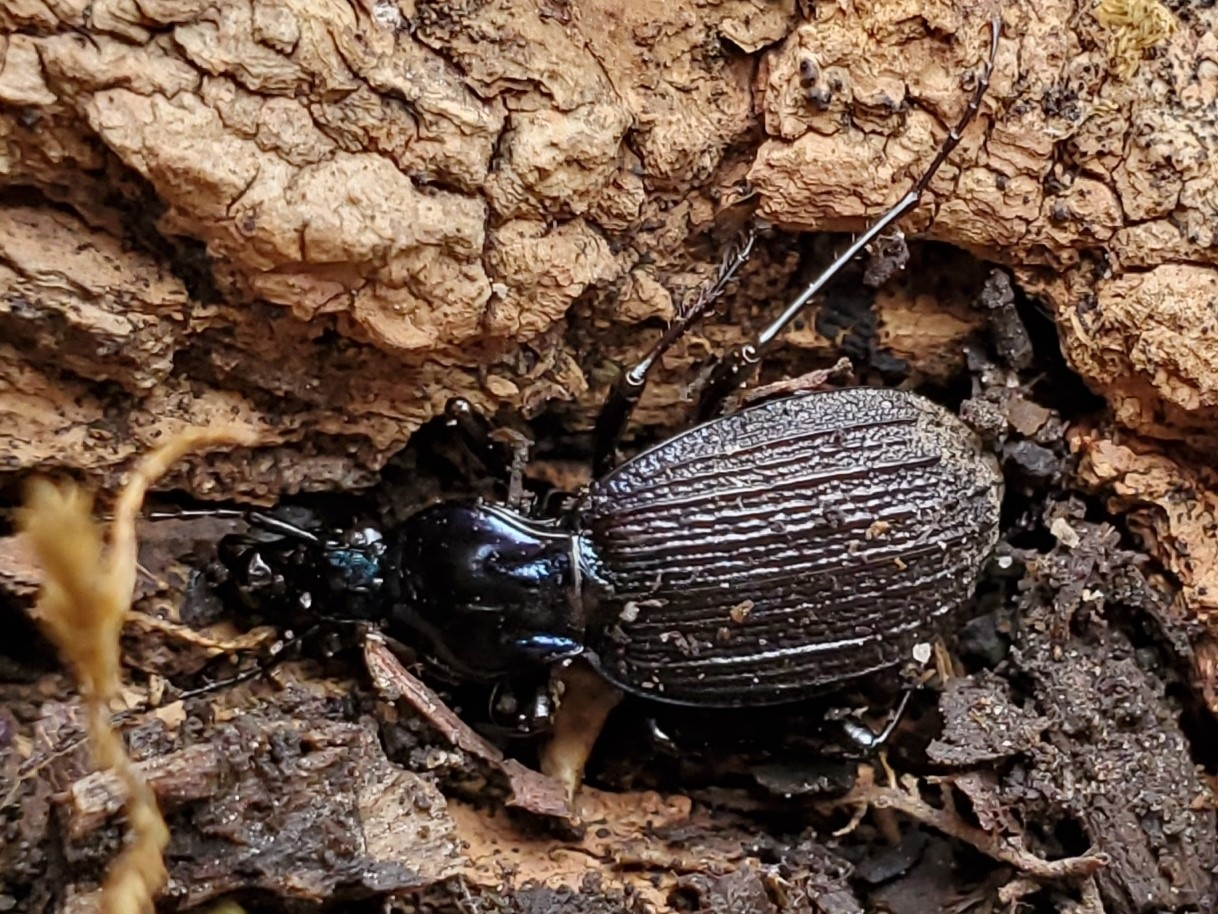

Scientific classification
- Domain: Eukaryota
- Kingdom: Animalia
- Phylum: Arthropoda
- Class: Insecta
- Order: Coleoptera
- Suborder: Adephaga
- Family: Carabidae
- Genus: Sphaeroderus
- Species: S. bicarinatus

Binomial name
- Sphaeroderus bicarinatus (LeConte, 1853)

Synonyms
- Sphaeroderus multicarinatus Darlington, 1931; Cychrus bicarinatus LeConte, 1853 (established)

= Sphaeroderus bicarinatus =

Species of beetle

Sphaeroderus bicarinatus, the two-ridged false snail-eating beetle, is a species of ground beetle in the family Carabidae. It is found in North America (Alabama, Geordia, North Carolina, South Carolina, Tennessee), where it inhabits coniferous, deciduous and mixed forests near rivers and brooks or the seashore.

Adults are brachypterous and mostly nocturnal. They prey on snails, Lepidoptera caterpillars and pupae.
