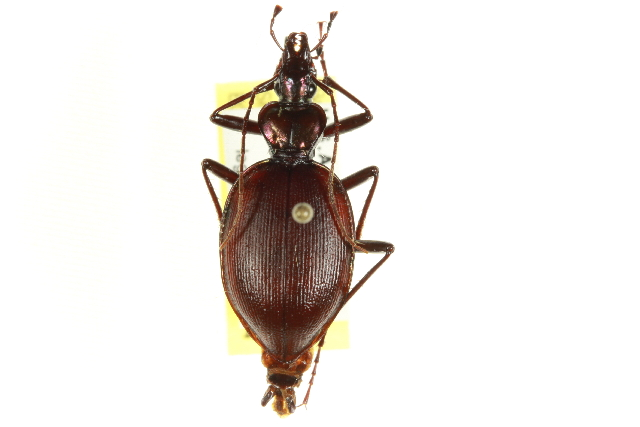

Scientific classification
- Kingdom: Animalia
- Phylum: Arthropoda
- Clade: Pancrustacea
- Class: Insecta
- Order: Coleoptera
- Suborder: Adephaga
- Family: Carabidae
- Genus: Scaphinotus
- Species: S. fissicollis

Binomial name
- Scaphinotus fissicollis (LeConte, 1853)

Synonyms
- Nomaretus fissicollis LeConte, 1853

= Scaphinotus fissicollis =

Species of beetle

Scaphinotus fissicollis, the cleft-collared snail-eating beetle, is a species of ground beetle in the family Carabidae. It is found in North America (Arkansas, Iowa, Illinois, Kansas, Missouri, Minnesota), where it inhabits deciduous and coniferous forests.

Adults are brachypterous.
