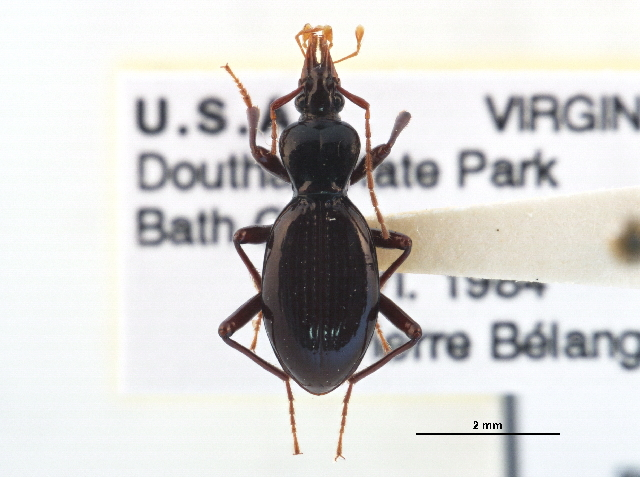

Scientific classification
- Kingdom: Animalia
- Phylum: Arthropoda
- Clade: Pancrustacea
- Class: Insecta
- Order: Coleoptera
- Suborder: Adephaga
- Family: Carabidae
- Genus: Scaphinotus
- Species: S. imperfectus

Binomial name
- Scaphinotus imperfectus (Horn, 1861)

Synonyms
- Nomaretus imperfectus G.Horn, 1861

= Scaphinotus imperfectus =

Species of beetle

Scaphinotus imperfectus, the imperfect snail-eating beetle, is a species of ground beetle in the family Carabidae ("ground beetles"), in the suborder Adephaga ("ground and water beetles"). It is found in North America (Maryland, North Carolina, Ohio, Pennsylvania, Virginia, West Virginia), where it inhabits deciduous and coniferous forests and thickets along streams.

Adults are brachypterous and nocturnal.
