= Scaphinotus lodingi =

Scientific classification
- Kingdom: Animalia
- Phylum: Arthropoda
- Clade: Pancrustacea
- Class: Insecta
- Order: Coleoptera
- Suborder: Adephaga
- Family: Carabidae
- Genus: Scaphinotus
- Species: S. lodingi

Binomial name
- Scaphinotus lodingi (Valentine, 1935)

Synonyms
- Steniridia lodingi Valentine, 1935; Steniridia obscura Valentine, 1935

Species of beetle

Scaphinotus lodingi is a species of beetle of the Carabidae family. This species is found in the United States (Alabama), where it inhabits forests and is occasionally also found in caves.

Adults are brachypterous.

== Subspecies ==
- Scaphinotus lodingi lodingi (Alabama) - Loding's snail-eating beetle
- Scaphinotus lodingi obscurus (Valentine, 1935) (Alabama) - obscure snail-eating beetle
