= Scaphinotus schwarzi =

Scientific classification
- Kingdom: Animalia
- Phylum: Arthropoda
- Clade: Pancrustacea
- Class: Insecta
- Order: Coleoptera
- Suborder: Adephaga
- Family: Carabidae
- Genus: Scaphinotus
- Species: S. schwarzi

Binomial name
- Scaphinotus schwarzi (Beutenmüller, 1913)

Synonyms
- Nomaretus schwarzi Beutenmüller, 1913

Species of beetle

Scaphinotus schwarzi, Schwarz's snail-eating beetle, is a species of beetle of the Carabidae family. This species is found in North America (North Carolina), where it inhabits forests.

Adults are brachypterous and nocturnal.
