= Scaphinotus incompletus =

Scientific classification
- Kingdom: Animalia
- Phylum: Arthropoda
- Clade: Pancrustacea
- Class: Insecta
- Order: Coleoptera
- Suborder: Adephaga
- Family: Carabidae
- Genus: Scaphinotus
- Species: S. incompletus

Binomial name
- Scaphinotus incompletus (Schwarz, 1895)

Synonyms
- Nomaretus incompletus Schwarz, 1895

Species of beetle

Scaphinotus incompletus, incomplete snail-eating beetle, is a species of beetle of the Carabidae family. This species is found in the United States (Kentucky, Virginia), where it inhabits mixed evergreen forests.

Adults are brachypterous.
