= Scaphinotus velutinus =

Scientific classification
- Kingdom: Animalia
- Phylum: Arthropoda
- Clade: Pancrustacea
- Class: Insecta
- Order: Coleoptera
- Suborder: Adephaga
- Family: Carabidae
- Genus: Scaphinotus
- Species: S. velutinus

Binomial name
- Scaphinotus velutinus (Ménétriés, 1843)

Synonyms
- Cychrus velutinus Ménétriés, 1843; Pemphus opacus Casey, 1899; Pemphus longipes Casey, 1897

Species of beetle

Scaphinotus velutinus, the velvet snail-eating beetle, is a species of ground beetle in the family Carabidae. It is found in North America (California, Oregon), where it inhabits coniferous forests.

Adults are brachypterous.
