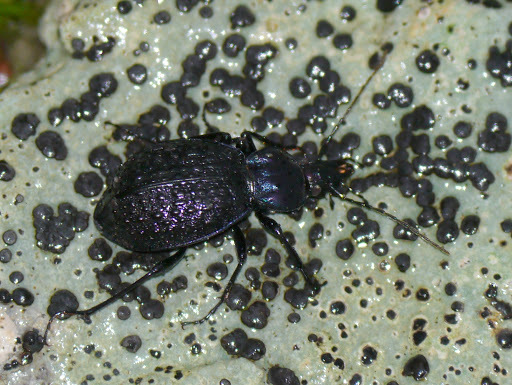

Scientific classification
- Domain: Eukaryota
- Kingdom: Animalia
- Phylum: Arthropoda
- Class: Insecta
- Order: Coleoptera
- Suborder: Adephaga
- Family: Carabidae
- Genus: Sphaeroderus
- Species: S. schaumii

Binomial name
- Sphaeroderus schaumii Chaudoir, 1861

= Sphaeroderus schaumii =

Schaum's ground beetle

Species of beetle

Sphaeroderus schaumii, commonly known as Schaum's ground beetle, is a species of ground beetle in the family Carabidae. It is found in North America (Illinois, Michigan, Ohio, Virginia, West Virginia), where it inhabits deciduous forests.

Adults are brachypterous and nocturnal. They prey on snails.
