= Scaphinotus parisiana =

Scientific classification
- Kingdom: Animalia
- Phylum: Arthropoda
- Clade: Pancrustacea
- Class: Insecta
- Order: Coleoptera
- Suborder: Adephaga
- Family: Carabidae
- Genus: Scaphinotus
- Species: S. parisiana

Binomial name
- Scaphinotus parisiana Allen & Carlton, 1988

Species of beetle

Scaphinotus parisiana, the Ozark snail-eating beetle, is a species of ground beetle in the family Carabidae. It is found in North America (Arkansas), where it inhabits deciduous forests in the Ouachita Mountains.

Adults are brachypterous and nocturnal.
