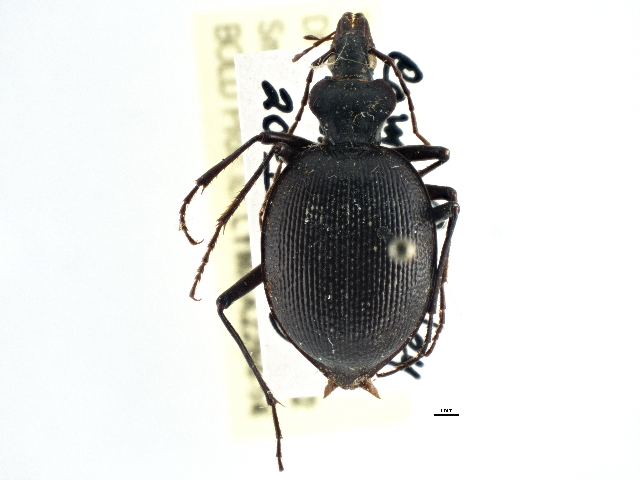

Scientific classification
- Kingdom: Animalia
- Phylum: Arthropoda
- Clade: Pancrustacea
- Class: Insecta
- Order: Coleoptera
- Suborder: Adephaga
- Family: Carabidae
- Genus: Scaphinotus
- Species: S. oreophilus

Binomial name
- Scaphinotus oreophilus (Rivers, 1890)

Synonyms
- Cychrus oreophilus Rivers, 1890; Brennus humeralis Casey, 1914; Brennus hoppingi Roeschke, 1907

= Scaphinotus oreophilus =

Species of beetle

Scaphinotus oreophilus, the mountain loving snail-eating beetle, is a species of ground beetle in the family Carabidae. It is found in North America (California, Nevada, Utah).

Adults are brachypterous.
