= Scaphinotus webbi =

Scientific classification
- Domain: Eukaryota
- Kingdom: Animalia
- Phylum: Arthropoda
- Class: Insecta
- Order: Coleoptera
- Suborder: Adephaga
- Family: Carabidae
- Genus: Scaphinotus
- Species: S. webbi

Binomial name
- Scaphinotus webbi Bell, 1959

Species of beetle

Scaphinotus webbi, Webb's snail-eating beetle, is a species of beetle of the Carabidae family. This species is found in North America (Pennsylvania, Virginia, West Virginia), where it inhabits deciduous forests. It is often found near brooks and springs.

Adults are brachypterous and nocturnal.
