= Scaphinotus cavicollis =

Scientific classification
- Kingdom: Animalia
- Phylum: Arthropoda
- Clade: Pancrustacea
- Class: Insecta
- Order: Coleoptera
- Suborder: Adephaga
- Family: Carabidae
- Genus: Scaphinotus
- Species: S. cavicollis

Binomial name
- Scaphinotus cavicollis (LeConte, 1859)

Synonyms
- Nomaretus cavicollis LeConte, 1859

Species of beetle

Scaphinotus cavicollis, the concave-collared snail-eating beetle, is a species of ground beetle in the family Carabidae. It is found in North America (Arkansas, Kansas, Missouri, Oklahoma), where it inhabits coniferous forests.

Adults are brachypterous and nocturnal.
