= Scaphinotus ventricosus =

Scientific classification
- Kingdom: Animalia
- Phylum: Arthropoda
- Clade: Pancrustacea
- Class: Insecta
- Order: Coleoptera
- Suborder: Adephaga
- Family: Carabidae
- Genus: Scaphinotus
- Species: S. ventricosus

Binomial name
- Scaphinotus ventricosus (Dejean, 1831)

Synonyms
- Cychrus ventricosus Dejean, 1831; Brennus brevicollis Casey, 1920; Cychrus ovalis Motschulsky, 1859; Brennus strictus Casey, 1897; Brennus symmetricus Casey, 1897; Cychrus fuchsianus Rivers, 1890; Cychrus alternatus Motschulsky, 1859; Cychrus lativentris Motschulsky, 1850

Species of beetle

Scaphinotus ventricosus, the potbellied snail-eating beetle, is a species of ground beetle in the family Carabidae. It is found in North America (California, Oregon), where it inhabits deciduous forests and poison-oak thickets.

Adults are brachypterous, gregarious and nocturnal.
