= Scaphinotus riversi =

Scientific classification
- Kingdom: Animalia
- Phylum: Arthropoda
- Clade: Pancrustacea
- Class: Insecta
- Order: Coleoptera
- Suborder: Adephaga
- Family: Carabidae
- Genus: Scaphinotus
- Species: S. riversi

Binomial name
- Scaphinotus riversi (Roeschke, 1907)

Synonyms
- Brennus riversi Roeschke, 1907

Species of beetle

Scaphinotus riversi, Rivers' snail-eating beetle, is a species of beetle of the Carabidae family. This species is found in North America (California), where it inhabits forests.

Adults are brachypterous and nocturnal.
