= Scaphinotus bullatus =

Scientific classification
- Kingdom: Animalia
- Phylum: Arthropoda
- Clade: Pancrustacea
- Class: Insecta
- Order: Coleoptera
- Suborder: Adephaga
- Family: Carabidae
- Genus: Scaphinotus
- Species: S. bullatus

Binomial name
- Scaphinotus bullatus Van Dyke, 1924

Synonyms
- Scaphinotus grandis Van Dyke, 1924

Species of beetle

Scaphinotus bullatus, the inflated snail-eating beetle, is a species of ground beetle in the family Carabidae. It is found in North America (California), where it inhabits coniferous and mixed forests.

Adults are brachypterous.
