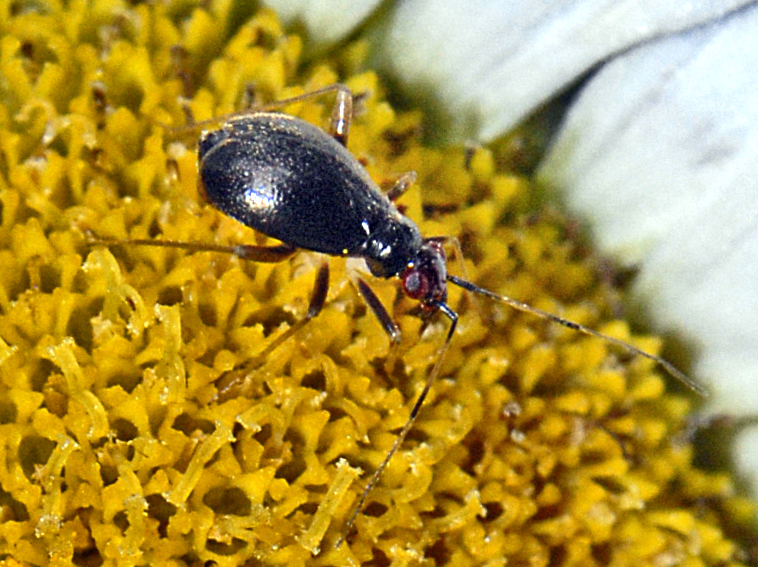
- Adult female of Orthonotus rufifrons
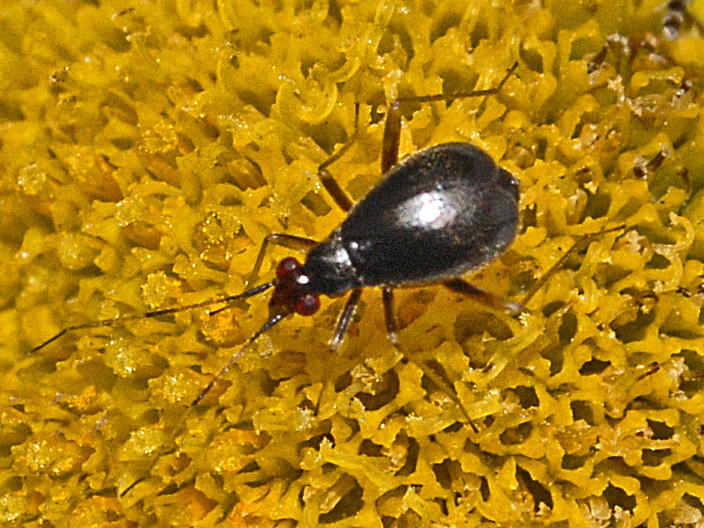
- Dorsal view

Scientific classification
- Kingdom: Animalia
- Phylum: Arthropoda
- Class: Insecta
- Order: Hemiptera
- Suborder: Heteroptera
- Family: Miridae
- Genus: Orthonotus
- Species: O. rufifrons

Binomial name
- Orthonotus rufifrons (Fallén, 1807

= Orthonotus rufifrons =

Species of true bug

Orthonotus rufifrons is a species of plant bugs belonging to the family Miridae.

== Description ==
Orthonotus rufifrons can reach a length of 3.9–4.6 millimetres (0.15–0.18 in) in males, of 3.0–3.4 millimetres (0.12–0.13 in) in females. These plant bugs are rounded in shape, dark brown in color and covered with pale hairs. In the females the head is reddish (hence the Latin name rufifrons, meaning reddish forehead) and the 2nd antennal segment shows a dark ring at the base, while in males antennae are completely dark brown. The legs are bright reddish.

The sexes are dimorphic. Females are brachypterous and show short hemielytrae, while males look like a typical mirid bug. In fact, they are fully winged (macropterous), with an elongated parallel-sided body. The nymphs are light red.

== Biology ==
Adults can be found from June to September. This species has one generation per year. Eggs overwinter and the nymphs usually occur in May. These bugs commonly live on stinging nettle (Urtica dioica). They feed on plant juices, as well as on small insects, especially aphids.

== Distribution ==
This species is present in most of Europe.

== Habitat ==
Orthonotus rufifrons occurs especially in damp or in shady places in forests.

== Bibliography ==
- Ekkehard Wachmann, Albert Melber, Jürgen Deckert: Wanzen. Band 2: Cimicomorpha: Microphysidae (Flechtenwanzen), Miridae (Weichwanzen) (= Die Tierwelt Deutschlands und der angrenzenden Meeresteile nach ihren Merkmalen und nach ihrer Lebensweise. 75. Teil). Goecke & Evers, Keltern 2006, ISBN 3-931374-57-2.
