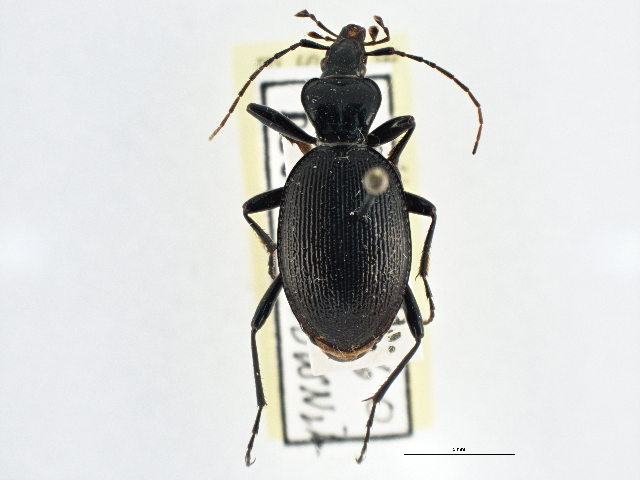

Scientific classification
- Kingdom: Animalia
- Phylum: Arthropoda
- Clade: Pancrustacea
- Class: Insecta
- Order: Coleoptera
- Suborder: Adephaga
- Family: Carabidae
- Genus: Scaphinotus
- Species: S. regularis

Binomial name
- Scaphinotus regularis (LeConte, 1884)

Synonyms
- Cychrus regularis LeConte, 1884

= Scaphinotus regularis =

Species of beetle

Scaphinotus regularis, measured snail-eating beetle, is a species of beetle of the Carabidae family. This species is found in North America (British Columbia, Idaho, Washington), where it inhabits forests.

Adults are brachypterous and nocturnal.
