= Scaphinotus mannii =

Scientific classification
- Kingdom: Animalia
- Phylum: Arthropoda
- Clade: Pancrustacea
- Class: Insecta
- Order: Coleoptera
- Suborder: Adephaga
- Family: Carabidae
- Genus: Scaphinotus
- Species: S. mannii

Binomial name
- Scaphinotus mannii Wickham, 1919

Species of beetle

Scaphinotus mannii, Mann's snail-eating beetle, is a species of beetle of the Carabidae family. This species is found in the United States (Oregon, Washington), where it inhabits forests fragments and scrub in canyons and along rivers.

Adults are brachypterous, gregarious and nocturnal.
