= Scaphinotus kelloggi =

Scientific classification
- Kingdom: Animalia
- Phylum: Arthropoda
- Clade: Pancrustacea
- Class: Insecta
- Order: Coleoptera
- Suborder: Adephaga
- Family: Carabidae
- Genus: Scaphinotus
- Species: S. kelloggi

Binomial name
- Scaphinotus kelloggi (Dury, 1912)

Synonyms
- Cychrus kelloggi Dury, 1912

Species of beetle

Scaphinotus kelloggi is a species of ground beetle in the family Carabidae. It is found in North America (New Mexico), where it inhabits canyons with streams or rivers.

Adults are brachypterous.
