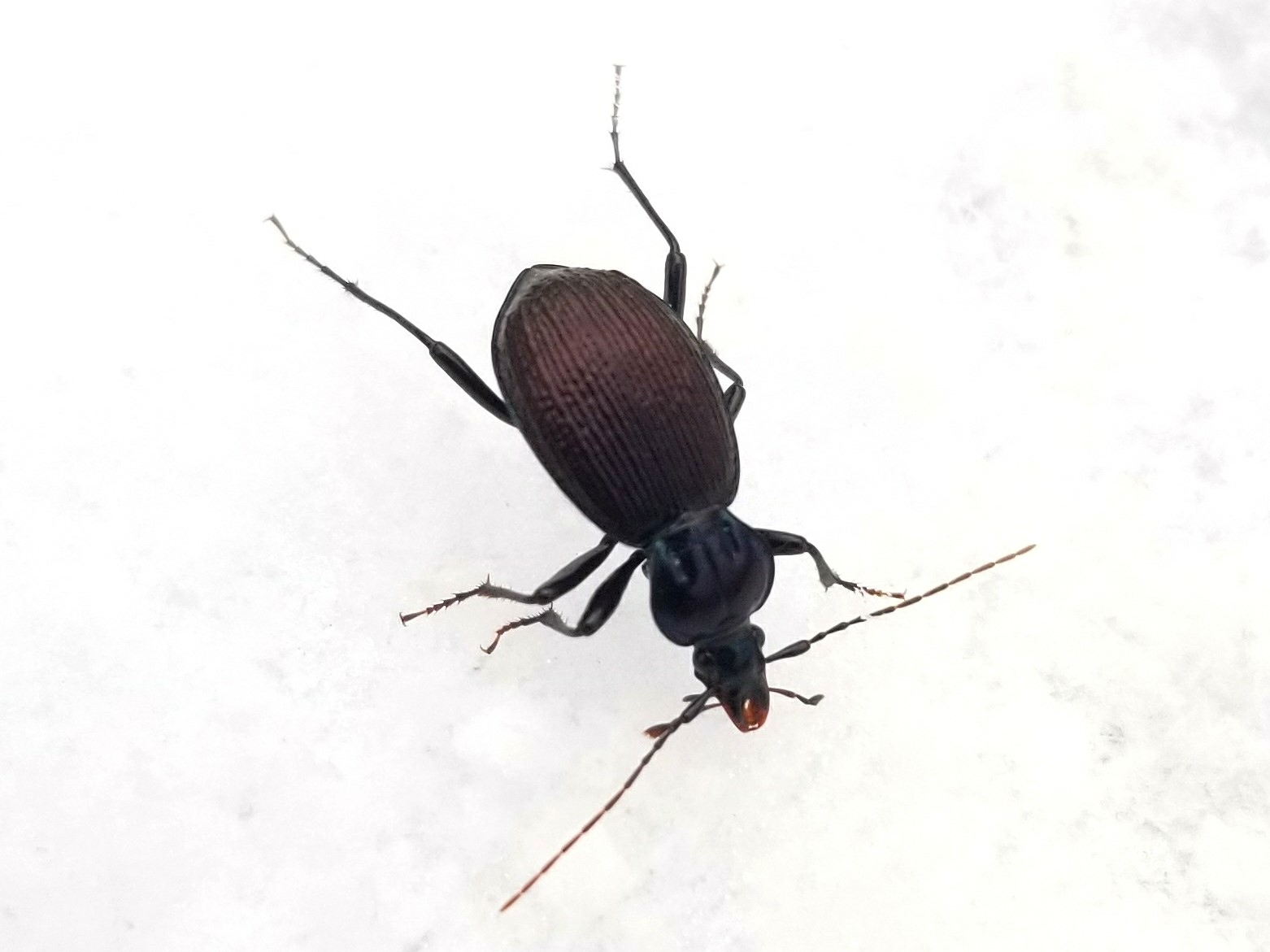
- Nominate subspecies

Scientific classification
- Kingdom: Animalia
- Phylum: Arthropoda
- Class: Insecta
- Order: Coleoptera
- Suborder: Adephaga
- Family: Carabidae
- Genus: Sphaeroderus
- Species: S. canadensis

Binomial name
- Sphaeroderus canadensis Chaudoir, 1861

Synonyms
- Sphaeroderus blanchardi Leng, 1916; Sphaeroderus palpalis Motschulsky, 1866

= Sphaeroderus canadensis =

Species of beetle

Sphaeroderus canadensis is a species of ground beetle in the family Carabidae. It is found in North America, where it inhabits coniferous, deciduous and mixed forests.

Adults are brachypterous and nocturnal.

== Subspecies ==
These two subspecies belong to the species Sphaeroderus canadensis:

- Sphaeroderus canadensis canadensis Chaudoir, 1861 (New Brunswick, Nova Scotia, Ontario, Quebec, Connecticut, Kentucky, Massachusetts, Maryland, Maine, Michigan, North Carolina, New Hampshire, New York, Ohio, Pennsylvania, South Carolina, Tennessee, Virginia, Vermont, West Virginia) - Canadian false snail-eating beetle
- Sphaeroderus canadensis lengi Darlington, 1933 (Georgia, North Carolina, South Carolina, TN, West Virginia) - Leng's false snail-eating beetle
