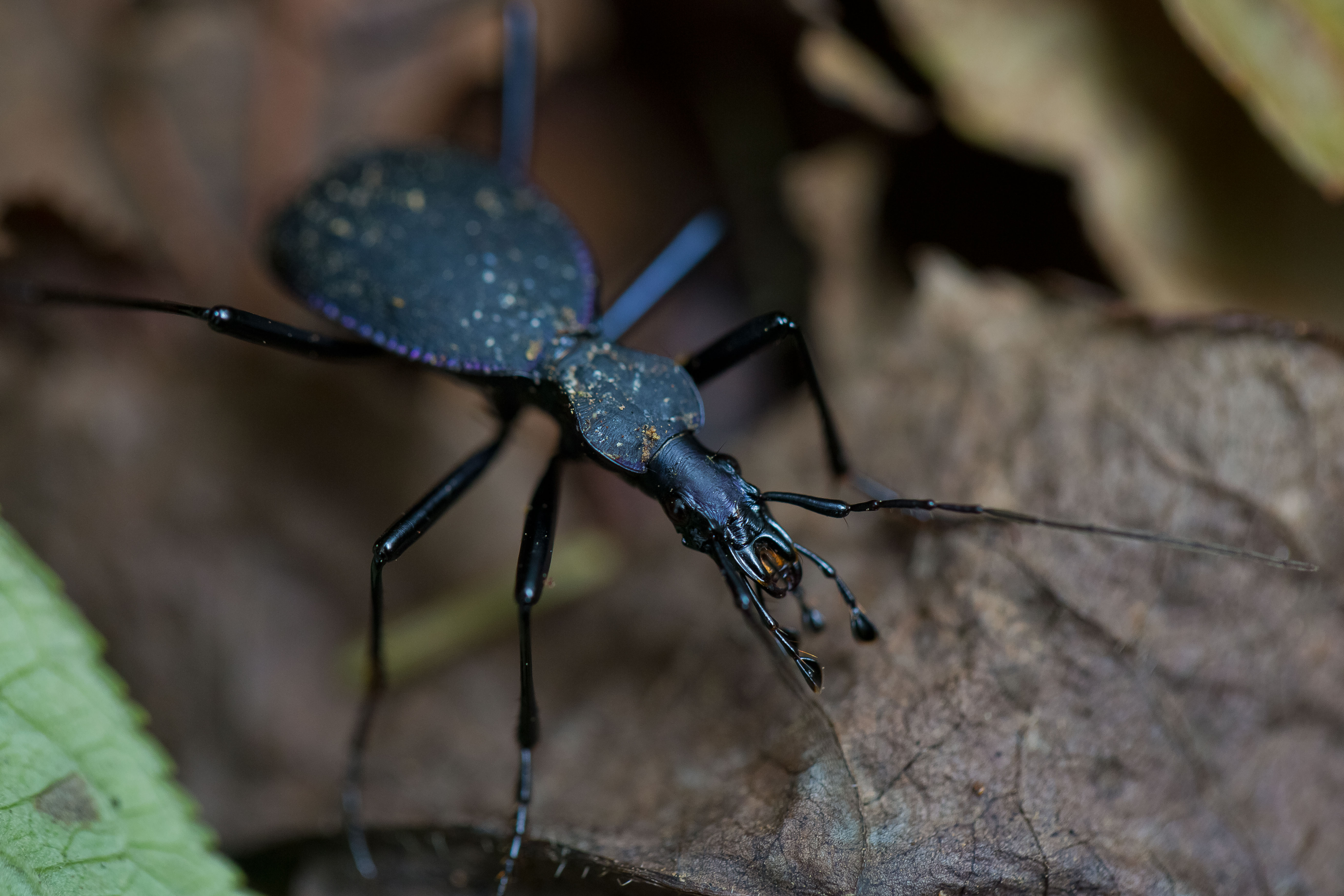

Scientific classification
- Kingdom: Animalia
- Phylum: Arthropoda
- Clade: Pancrustacea
- Class: Insecta
- Order: Coleoptera
- Suborder: Adephaga
- Family: Carabidae
- Genus: Scaphinotus
- Species: S. angusticollis

Binomial name
- Scaphinotus angusticollis (Mannerheim in Fischer von Waldheim, 1823)

Synonyms
- Cychrus angusticollis Mannerheim, 1823; Scaphinotus olympiae Van Dyke, 1944; Pemphus nigripennis Roeschke, 1907

= Scaphinotus angusticollis =

Species of beetle

Scaphinotus angusticollis, the narrow-collared snail-eating beetle, is a species of ground beetle in the family Carabidae. It is found in North America (British Columbia, Quebec, Alaska, California, Oregon, Washington), where it inhabits in coniferous, mixed and deciduous and cultivated fields.

Adults are brachypterous, gregarious and nocturnal.

It has been seen to come in various colors, like dark black and deep red. These color morphs appear to be regional.

They have been seen to prey on snails, slugs, earthworms, and spiders.

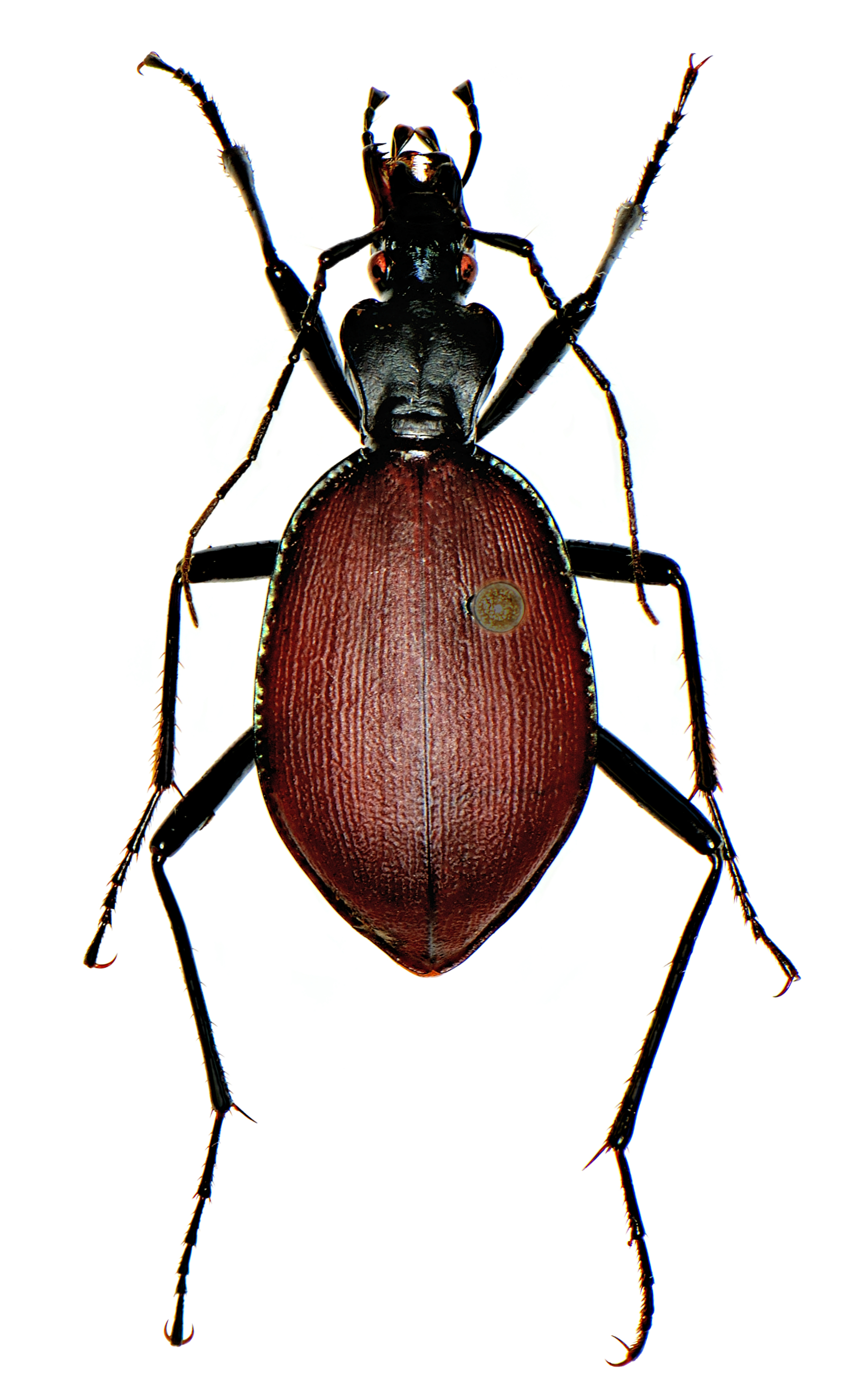
Red form of Scaphinotus angusticollis. The red form is mostly found in western Cascade mountains in Oregon. Black form of Scaphinotus angusticollis is found in coastal mountain range in Oregon.
