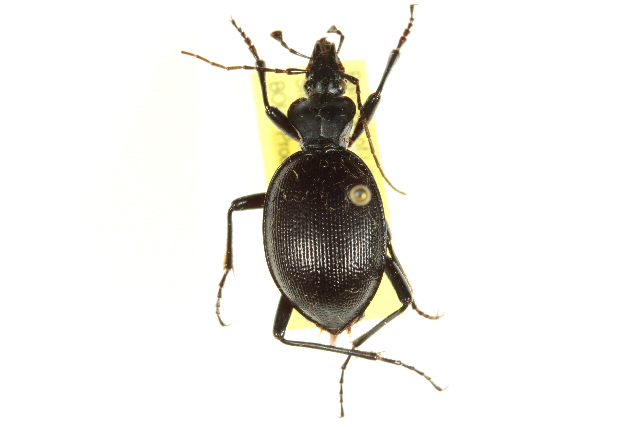

Scientific classification
- Kingdom: Animalia
- Phylum: Arthropoda
- Clade: Pancrustacea
- Class: Insecta
- Order: Coleoptera
- Suborder: Adephaga
- Family: Carabidae
- Genus: Scaphinotus
- Species: S. striatopunctatus

Binomial name
- Scaphinotus striatopunctatus (Chaudoir, 1844)

Synonyms
- Cychrus striatopunctatus Chaudoir, 1844; Brennus subdepressus Casey, 1920; Brennus decipiens Casey, 1897

= Scaphinotus striatopunctatus =

Species of beetle

Scaphinotus striatopunctatus, the pore-winged snail-eating beetle, is a species of ground beetle in the family Carabidae. It is found in North America (California), where it inhabits deciduous forests, canyons and grassy knolls.

Adults are brachypterous, gregarious and nocturnal.
