= Scaphinotus cristatus =

Scientific classification
- Kingdom: Animalia
- Phylum: Arthropoda
- Clade: Pancrustacea
- Class: Insecta
- Order: Coleoptera
- Suborder: Adephaga
- Family: Carabidae
- Genus: Scaphinotus
- Species: S. cristatus

Binomial name
- Scaphinotus cristatus (T. Harris, 1839)

Synonyms
- Cychrus cristatus T.W.Harris, 1839; Brennus basalis Casey, 1897; Brennus duplicatus Casey, 1897; Cychrus reticulatus Motschulsky, 1850

Species of beetle

Scaphinotus cristatus, the ridged thorax snail-eating beetle, is a species of ground beetle in the family Carabidae. It is found in North America (California, Oregon), where it inhabits mixed and coniferous forests.

Adults are brachypterous.
