= Scaphinotus violaceus =

Scientific classification
- Domain: Eukaryota
- Kingdom: Animalia
- Phylum: Arthropoda
- Class: Insecta
- Order: Coleoptera
- Suborder: Adephaga
- Family: Carabidae
- Genus: Scaphinotus
- Species: S. violaceus

Binomial name
- Scaphinotus violaceus (LeConte, 1863)

Synonyms
- Cychrus violaceus LeConte, 1863; Scaphinotus violaceus carolinae (Valentine, 1935); Steniridia violacea carolinae Valentine, 1935

Species of beetle

Scaphinotus violaceus, the violet snail-eating beetle, is a species of ground beetle in the family Carabidae. It is found in North America (North Carolina, South Carolina, Georgia), where it inhabits deciduous and mixed forests.

Adults are brachypterous and nocturnal.
