= Scaphinotus obliquus =

Scientific classification
- Kingdom: Animalia
- Phylum: Arthropoda
- Clade: Pancrustacea
- Class: Insecta
- Order: Coleoptera
- Suborder: Adephaga
- Family: Carabidae
- Genus: Scaphinotus
- Species: S. obliquus

Binomial name
- Scaphinotus obliquus (LeConte, 1868)

Synonyms
- Cychrus obliquus LeConte, 1868; Brennus convergens Casey, 1897; Brennus opacicollis Casey, 1897; Brennus sculptipennis Casey, 1897

Species of beetle

Scaphinotus obliquus, the oblique snail-eating beetle, is a species of ground beetle in the family Carabidae. It is found in North America (California, Oregon), where it inhabits forests.

Adults are brachypterous.
