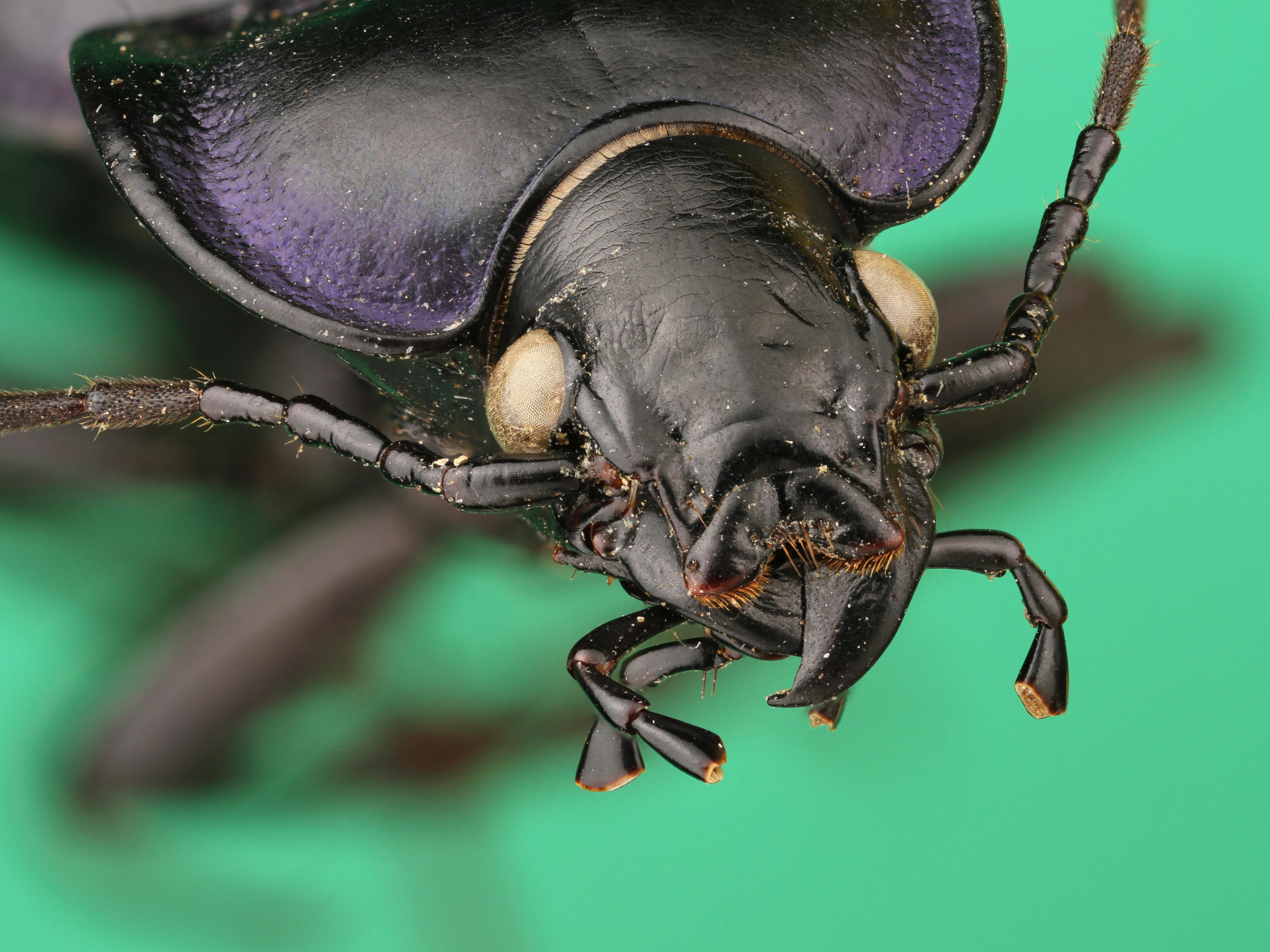

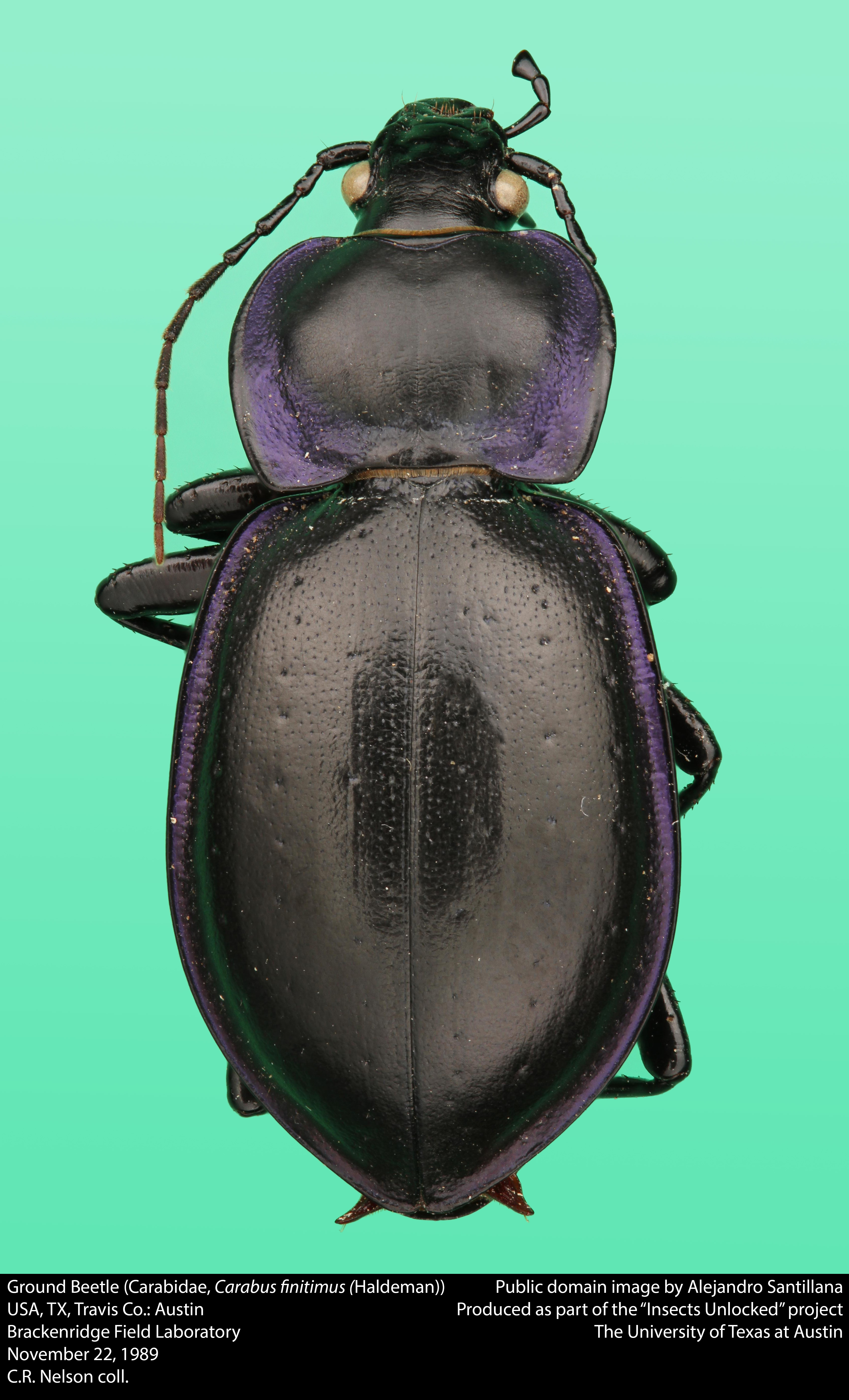

Scientific classification
- Domain: Eukaryota
- Kingdom: Animalia
- Phylum: Arthropoda
- Class: Insecta
- Order: Coleoptera
- Suborder: Adephaga
- Family: Carabidae
- Genus: Carabus
- Species: C. finitimus

Binomial name
- Carabus finitimus Haldeman, 1852

Synonyms
- Carabus caseyi Angell, 1914; Carabus lecontei Casey, 1913

= Carabus finitimus =

Species of beetle

Carabus finitimus, Haldeman's worm and slug hunter, is a bluish-coloured species of beetle in the family Carabidae. It is found in Kansas, Oklahoma and Texas, where it inhabits bottomland forests along rivers.

Adults are brachypterous and nocturnal.
