= Scaphinotus behrensi =

Scientific classification
- Kingdom: Animalia
- Phylum: Arthropoda
- Clade: Pancrustacea
- Class: Insecta
- Order: Coleoptera
- Suborder: Adephaga
- Family: Carabidae
- Genus: Scaphinotus
- Species: S. behrensi

Binomial name
- Scaphinotus behrensi (Roeschke, 1907)

Synonyms
- Neocychrus behrensi Roeschke, 1907; Scaphinotus malkini Van Dyke, 1944

Species of beetle

Scaphinotus behrensi, Behren's snail-eating beetle, is a species of beetle of the Carabidae family. This species is found in the US (California, Oregon), where it inhabits temperate coniferous rainforests.

Adults are brachypterous and nocturnal.
