= Scaphinotus infletus =

Scientific classification
- Kingdom: Animalia
- Phylum: Arthropoda
- Clade: Pancrustacea
- Class: Insecta
- Order: Coleoptera
- Suborder: Adephaga
- Family: Carabidae
- Genus: Scaphinotus
- Species: S. infletus

Binomial name
- Scaphinotus infletus Allen & Carlton, 1988

Species of beetle

Scaphinotus infletus, the forgotten snail-eating beetle, is a species of ground beetle in the family Carabidae. It is found in North America (Arkansas), where it inhabits moist, well shaded areas.

Adults are brachypterous.
