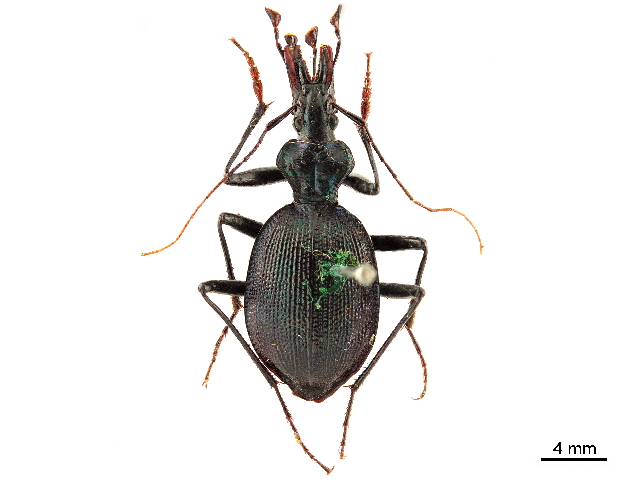

Scientific classification
- Kingdom: Animalia
- Phylum: Arthropoda
- Clade: Pancrustacea
- Class: Insecta
- Order: Coleoptera
- Suborder: Adephaga
- Family: Carabidae
- Genus: Scaphinotus
- Species: S. tricarinatus

Binomial name
- Scaphinotus tricarinatus (Casey, 1914)

Synonyms
- Irichroa tricarinata Casey, 1914

= Scaphinotus tricarinatus =

Species of beetle

Scaphinotus tricarinatus, the three-ridged snail-eating beetle, is a species of ground beetle in the family Carabidae. It is found in North America (North Carolina, South Carolina, Tennessee), where it inhabits forests, often in ravines along streams.

Adults are brachypterous and nocturnal.
