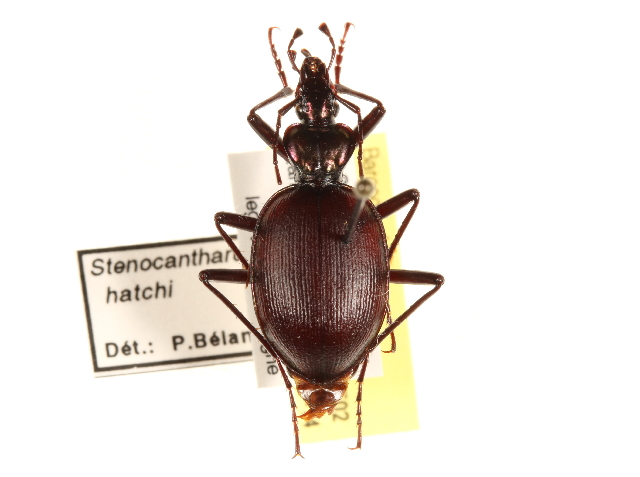

Scientific classification
- Kingdom: Animalia
- Phylum: Arthropoda
- Clade: Pancrustacea
- Class: Insecta
- Order: Coleoptera
- Suborder: Adephaga
- Family: Carabidae
- Genus: Scaphinotus
- Species: S. hatchi

Binomial name
- Scaphinotus hatchi Beer, 1971

= Scaphinotus hatchi =

Species of beetle

Scaphinotus hatchi, Hatch's snail-eating beetle, is a species of beetle of the Carabidae family. This species is found in the United States (Oregon), where it inhabits coniferous forests.

Adults are brachypterous and nocturnal.
