= Scaphinotus mexicanus =

Scientific classification
- Kingdom: Animalia
- Phylum: Arthropoda
- Clade: Pancrustacea
- Class: Insecta
- Order: Coleoptera
- Suborder: Adephaga
- Family: Carabidae
- Genus: Scaphinotus
- Species: S. mexicanus

Binomial name
- Scaphinotus mexicanus (Bates, 1882)

Synonyms
- Cychrus (Scaphinotus) mexicanus Bates, 1882

Species of beetle

Scaphinotus mexicanus, Mexican snail-eating beetle, is a species of beetle of the Carabidae family. This species is found in Mexico (Durango), where it inhabits upland to mountainous areas.

Adults are brachypterous.
