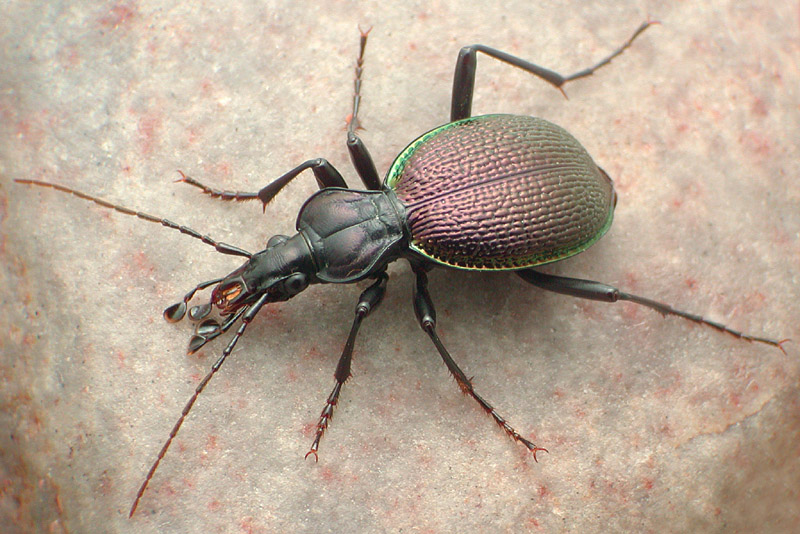

Scientific classification
- Kingdom: Animalia
- Phylum: Arthropoda
- Clade: Pancrustacea
- Class: Insecta
- Order: Coleoptera
- Suborder: Adephaga
- Family: Carabidae
- Genus: Scaphinotus
- Species: S. marginatus

Binomial name
- Scaphinotus marginatus (Fischer von Waldheim, 1820)

Synonyms
- Cychrus marginatus Fischer von Waldheim, 1820; Brennus columbianus Casey, 1920; Brennus montanicus Casey, 1920; Brennus oregonus Casey, 1920; Brennus wrangelli Casey, 1920; Brennus fallax Roeschke, 1907; Brennus confusus Casey, 1897; Brennus cupripennis Casey, 1897; Cychrus fulleri G.Horn, 1879; Brennus insularis Casey, 1897; Cychrus gracilis Géhin, 1885

= Scaphinotus marginatus =

Species of beetle

Scaphinotus marginatus, the margined snail-eating beetle, is a species of ground beetle in the family Carabidae. It is found in North America (Alberta, British Columbia, Quebec, Alaska, California, Idaho, Montana, Oregon, Washington, Wyoming), where it inhabits coniferous, mixed and deciduous forests, often along streams and lakes.

Adults are brachypterous and nocturnal. They prey on snails and slugs.
