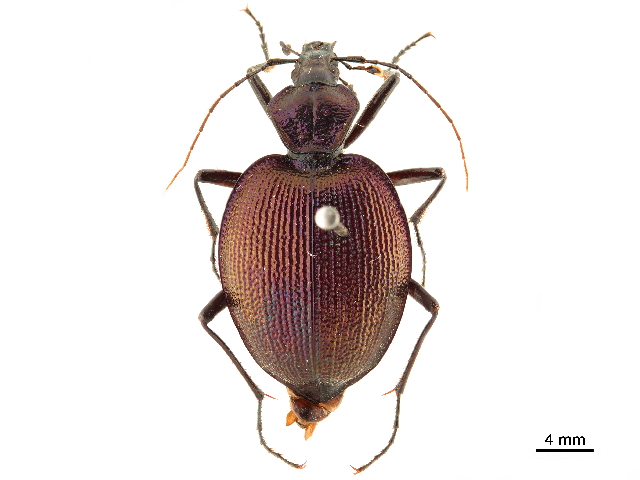

Scientific classification
- Kingdom: Animalia
- Phylum: Arthropoda
- Class: Insecta
- Order: Coleoptera
- Suborder: Adephaga
- Family: Carabidae
- Genus: Scaphinotus
- Species: S. viduus

Binomial name
- Scaphinotus viduus (Dejean, 1826)

Synonyms
- Cychrus viduus Dejean, 1826; Cychrus leonardii T.W.Harris, 1839

= Scaphinotus viduus =

Species of beetle

Scaphinotus viduus, the bereft snail-eating beetle, is a species of ground beetles in the family Carabidae. It is found in North America (New Brunswick, Nova Scotia, Quebec, Connecticut, District of Columbia, Delaware, Georgia, Massachusetts, Maine, Maryland, North Carolina, New Hampshire, New Jersey, New York, Ohio, Pennsylvania, Virginia, Vermont, West Virginia), where it inhabits coniferous forests, usually in areas close to water.

Adults are brachypterous, gregarious and nocturnal. They prey on snails, slugs and caterpillars.
