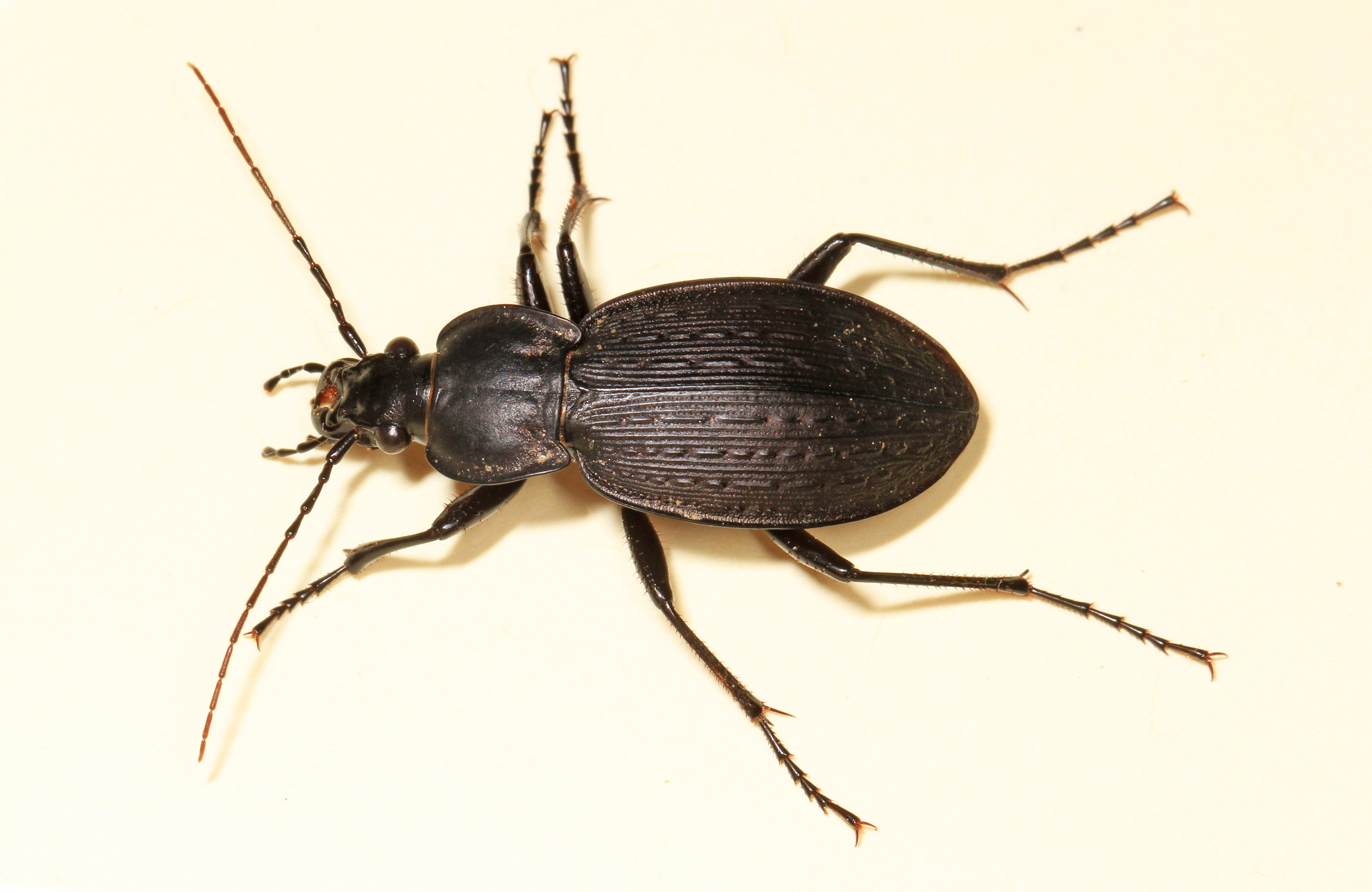

Scientific classification
- Domain: Eukaryota
- Kingdom: Animalia
- Phylum: Arthropoda
- Class: Insecta
- Order: Coleoptera
- Suborder: Adephaga
- Family: Carabidae
- Genus: Carabus
- Species: C. vinctus

Binomial name
- Carabus vinctus (Weber, 1801)

Synonyms
- Tachypus vinctus Weber, 1801; Carabus georgiae Csiki, 1927; Carabus carinatus Dejean, 1826; Carabus interruptus Say, 1823; Carabus ligatus Germar, 1823

= Carabus vinctus =

Species of beetle

Carabus vinctus, the stitched ground beetle or bound worm and slug hunter, is a species of ground beetle in the family Carabidae. It is found in North America, where it flood plain forests, low deciduous forests and swamp-forests.

Adults are brachypterous and nocturnal. They are scavengers on dead fish and meat.
