= Carabus hendrichsi =

Scientific classification
- Domain: Eukaryota
- Kingdom: Animalia
- Phylum: Arthropoda
- Class: Insecta
- Order: Coleoptera
- Suborder: Adephaga
- Family: Carabidae
- Genus: Carabus
- Species: C. hendrichsi

Binomial name
- Carabus hendrichsi Bolivar y Pieltain, Rotger & Coronado, 1967

Species of beetle

Carabus hendrichsi, or Hendrich's worm and slug hunter, is a species of beetle of the Carabidae family. This species is found in Mexico (Nuevo León and Tamaulipas), where it inhabits mixed and coniferous forests in the mountains.

Adults are brachypterous and nocturnal.
