= Scaphinotus liebecki =

Scientific classification
- Kingdom: Animalia
- Phylum: Arthropoda
- Clade: Pancrustacea
- Class: Insecta
- Order: Coleoptera
- Suborder: Adephaga
- Family: Carabidae
- Genus: Scaphinotus
- Species: S. liebecki

Binomial name
- Scaphinotus liebecki Van Dyke, 1936

Species of beetle

Scaphinotus liebecki, or Liebeck's snail-eating beetle, is a species of ground beetle in the family Carabidae. It is found in North America (Arkansas, Louisiana, Texas), where it inhabits pine/oak forests.

Adults are brachypterous.
