= Scaphinotus tenuis =

Scientific classification
- Kingdom: Animalia
- Phylum: Arthropoda
- Clade: Pancrustacea
- Class: Insecta
- Order: Coleoptera
- Suborder: Adephaga
- Family: Carabidae
- Genus: Scaphinotus
- Species: S. tenuis

Binomial name
- Scaphinotus tenuis (Casey, 1914)

Synonyms
- Maronetus tenuis Casey, 1914

Species of beetle

Scaphinotus tenuis, the thin snail-eating beetle, is a species of ground beetle in the family Carabidae. It is found in North America (North Carolina), where it inhabits forests.

Adults are brachypterous and nocturnal.
