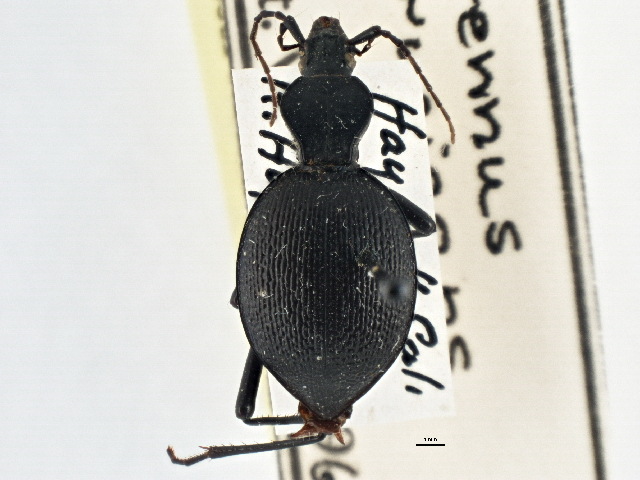

Scientific classification
- Kingdom: Animalia
- Phylum: Arthropoda
- Clade: Pancrustacea
- Class: Insecta
- Order: Coleoptera
- Suborder: Adephaga
- Family: Carabidae
- Genus: Scaphinotus
- Species: S. rugiceps

Binomial name
- Scaphinotus rugiceps (G.Horn, 1872)

Synonyms
- Cychrus rugiceps G.Horn, 1872; Brennus incipiens Casey, 1897; Brennus congener Casey, 1914; Brennus compositus Casey, 1897; Brennus porcatus Casey, 1897

= Scaphinotus rugiceps =

Species of beetle

Scaphinotus rugiceps is a species of beetle of the Carabidae family. This species is found in North America (California, Oregon), where it inhabits mixed and coniferous forests.

Adults are brachypterous and nocturnal.

== Subspecies ==
- Scaphinotus rugiceps incipiens (Casey, 1897) (California) - Casey's snail-eating beetle
- Scaphinotus rugiceps rugiceps (California, Oregon) - wrinkle-headed snail-eating beetle
