= Scaphinotus aeneicollis =

Scientific classification
- Kingdom: Animalia
- Phylum: Arthropoda
- Clade: Pancrustacea
- Class: Insecta
- Order: Coleoptera
- Suborder: Adephaga
- Family: Carabidae
- Genus: Scaphinotus
- Species: S. aeneicollis

Binomial name
- Scaphinotus aeneicollis (Beutenmüller, 1903)

Synonyms
- Cychrus aeneicollis Beutenmüller, 1903; Cychrus purpuratus Beutenmüller, 1918

Species of beetle

Scaphinotus aeneicollis, the coppery-collared snail-eating beetle, is a species of ground beetle in the family Carabidae. It is found in North America (southern Appalachia in North Carolina), where it inhabits coniferous forests.

Adults are brachypterous and nocturnal.
