= Scaphinotus hubbardi =

Scientific classification
- Kingdom: Animalia
- Phylum: Arthropoda
- Clade: Pancrustacea
- Class: Insecta
- Order: Coleoptera
- Suborder: Adephaga
- Family: Carabidae
- Genus: Scaphinotus
- Species: S. hubbardi

Binomial name
- Scaphinotus hubbardi (Schwarz, 1895)

Synonyms
- Nomaretus hubbardi Schwarz, 1895

Species of beetle

Scaphinotus hubbardi, Hubbard's snail-eating beetle, is a species of ground beetle in the family Carabidae. It is found in North America (North Carolina, Tennessee, Virginia), where it inhabits coniferous forests.

Adults are brachypterous and nocturnal.
