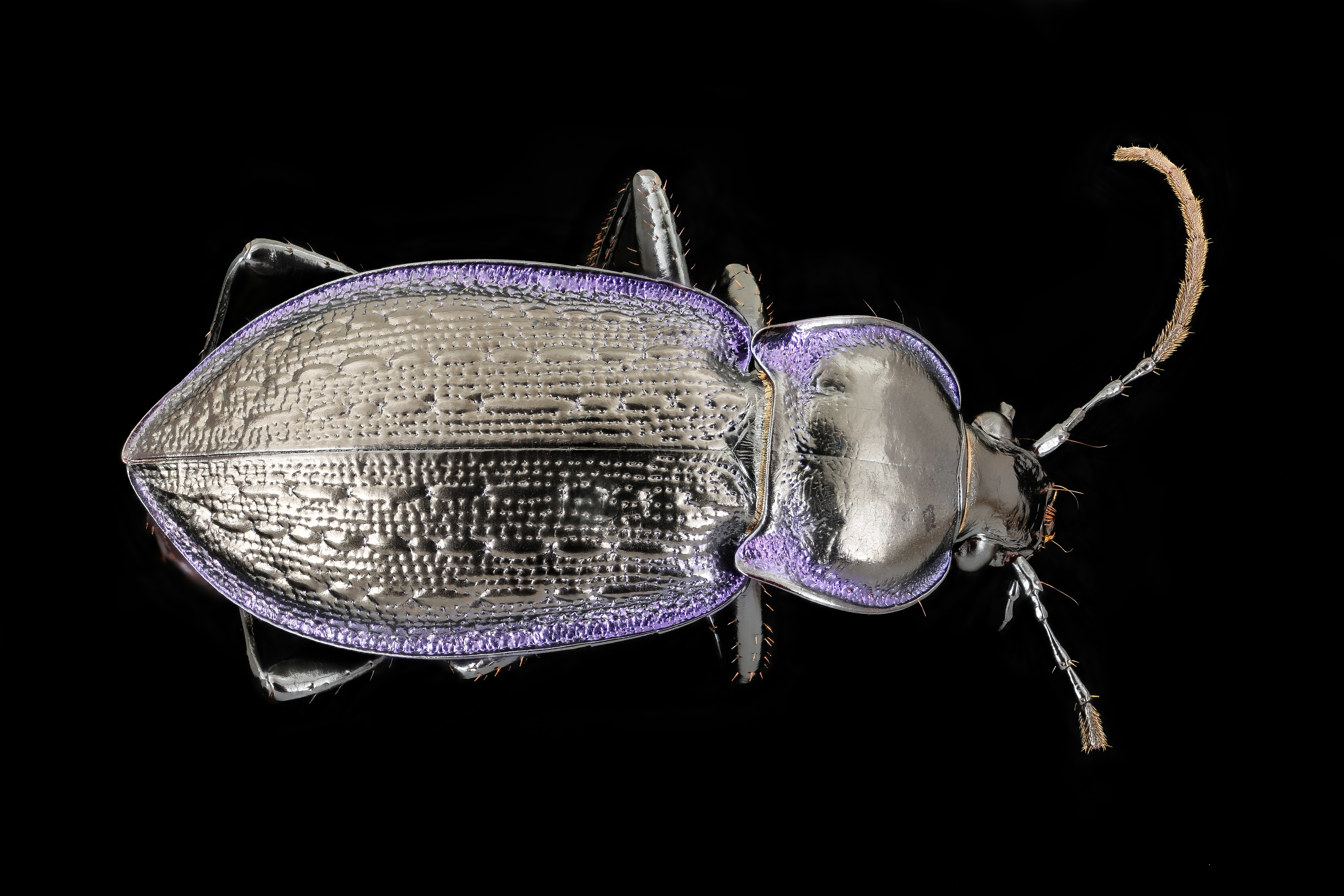

Scientific classification
- Domain: Eukaryota
- Kingdom: Animalia
- Phylum: Arthropoda
- Class: Insecta
- Order: Coleoptera
- Suborder: Adephaga
- Family: Carabidae
- Genus: Carabus
- Species: C. serratus

Binomial name
- Carabus serratus Say, 1823

Synonyms
- Carabus vegasensis Casey, 1913; Carabus tatumi Motschulsky, 1866; Carabus canadensis LeConte in Melsheimer, 1853; Carabus lineatopunctatus Dejean, 1826

= Carabus serratus =

Species of beetle

Carabus serratus, the serrate-shoulder worm and slug hunter, is a species of ground beetle in the family Carabidae. It is found in North America, where it inhabits moraines, gravel and sand pits, meadows, pastures and cultivated fields, but also forest clearings and open forests.

Adults are wing-dimorphic, with some being macropterous, while others are brachypterous. They are mostly nocturnal and adults have been found overwintering in the upper zone of sand pits and gravel pits.
