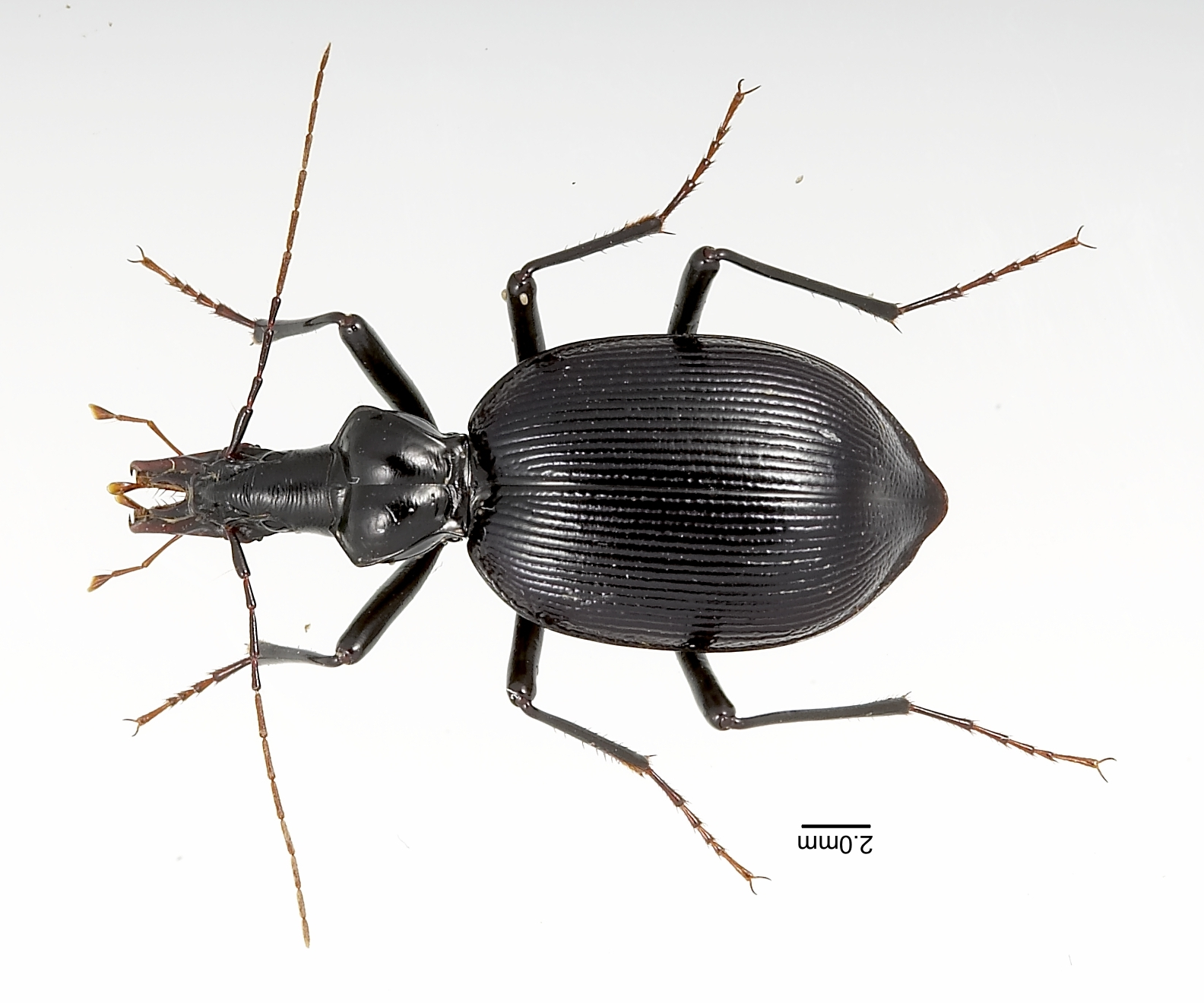

Scientific classification
- Kingdom: Animalia
- Phylum: Arthropoda
- Clade: Pancrustacea
- Class: Insecta
- Order: Coleoptera
- Suborder: Adephaga
- Family: Carabidae
- Genus: Scaphinotus
- Species: S. longiceps

Binomial name
- Scaphinotus longiceps Van Dyke, 1924

= Scaphinotus longiceps =

Species of beetle

Scaphinotus longiceps, the Humboldt ground beetle or long-headed snail-eating beetle, is a species of ground beetle in the family Carabidae. It is found in North America (California), where it inhabits coastal temperate coniferous rainforests and mixed forests.

Adults are brachypterous and nocturnal.
