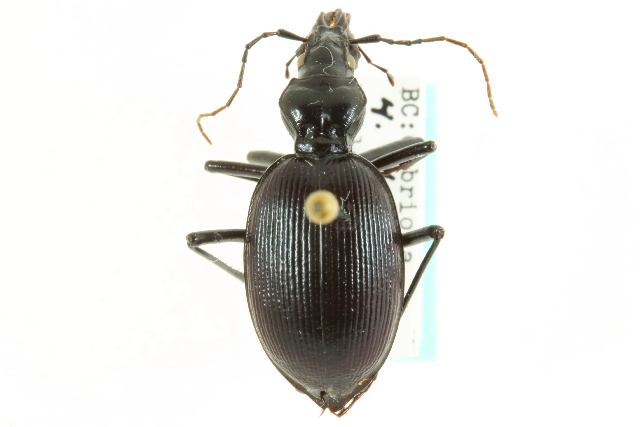

Scientific classification
- Kingdom: Animalia
- Phylum: Arthropoda
- Clade: Pancrustacea
- Class: Insecta
- Order: Coleoptera
- Suborder: Adephaga
- Family: Carabidae
- Genus: Scaphinotus
- Species: S. angulatus

Binomial name
- Scaphinotus angulatus (T. Harris, 1839)

Synonyms
- Cychrus angulatus T.W.Harris, 1839; Scaphinotus maritimus Van Dyke, 1924

= Scaphinotus angulatus =

Species of beetle

Scaphinotus angulatus, the angulate snail-eating beetle, is a species of ground beetle in the family Carabidae. It is found in North America (British Columbia, Oregon, Washington), where it inhabits temperate coniferous rainforests.

Adults are brachypterous and nocturnal. They prey on snails.
