= Carabus forreri =

Scientific classification
- Domain: Eukaryota
- Kingdom: Animalia
- Phylum: Arthropoda
- Class: Insecta
- Order: Coleoptera
- Suborder: Adephaga
- Family: Carabidae
- Genus: Carabus
- Species: C. forreri

Binomial name
- Carabus forreri Bates, 1882

Synonyms
- Carabus townsendi Casey, 1905; Carabus forreri willi Deuve, 2003

Species of beetle

Carabus forreri, Forrer's worm and slug hunter, is a species of ground beetle in the family Carabidae. It is found in Central America and North America (Chihuahua, Durango and Arizona), where it inhabits dry oak-pine forests.

Adults are brachypterous and nocturnal.
