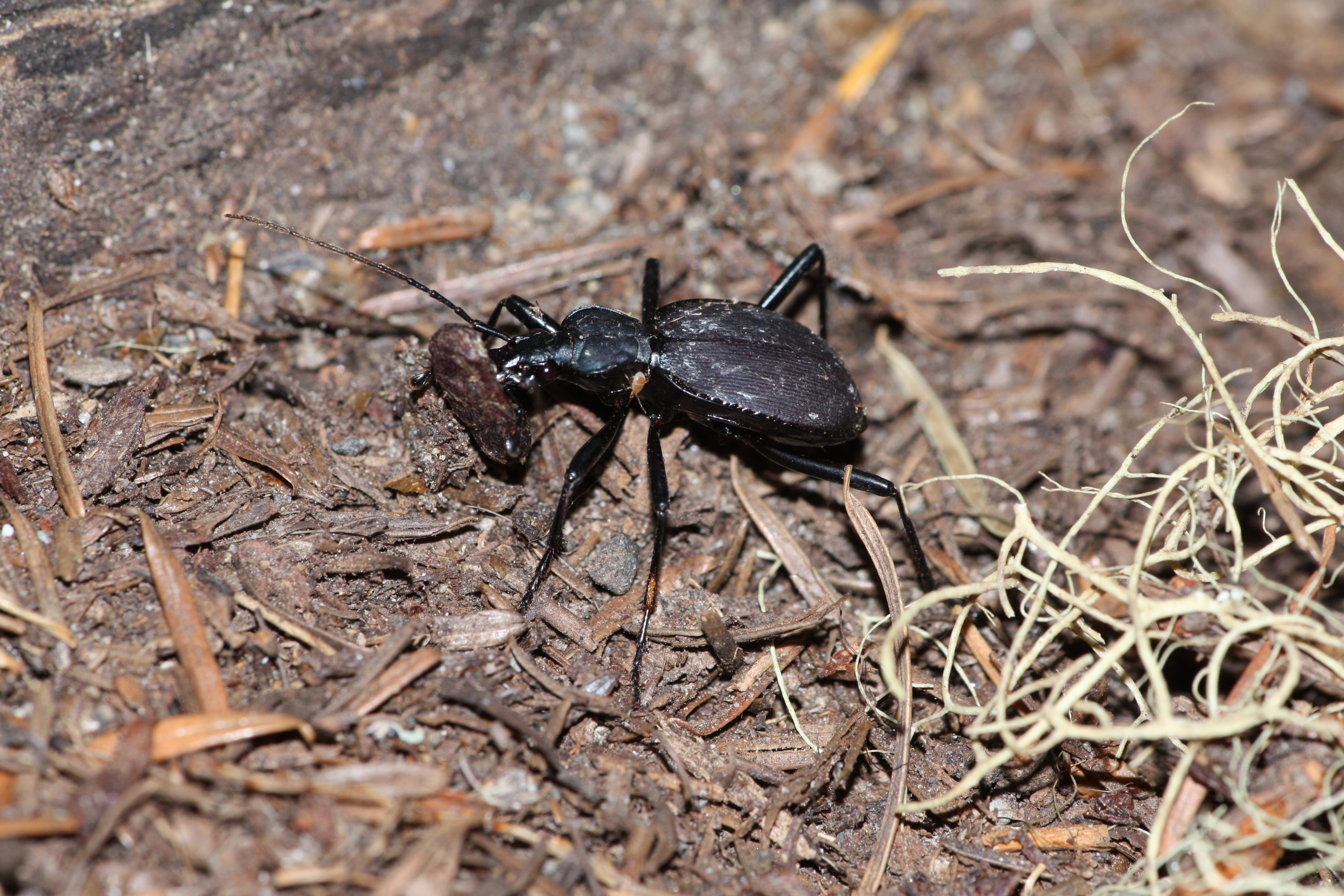
- Scaphinotus angusticollis in Olympic National Forest, United States

Scientific classification
- Kingdom: Animalia
- Phylum: Arthropoda
- Clade: Pancrustacea
- Class: Insecta
- Order: Coleoptera
- Suborder: Adephaga
- Family: Carabidae
- Subfamily: Carabinae
- Tribe: Cychrini
- Genus: Scaphinotus; Dejean, 1826

= Scaphinotus =

Genus of beetles

Scaphinotus is a genus of beetles in the family Carabidae. There are at least 60 species, all native to North America. They eat snails and are generally limited to the moist environments where snails live. These beetles are flightless.

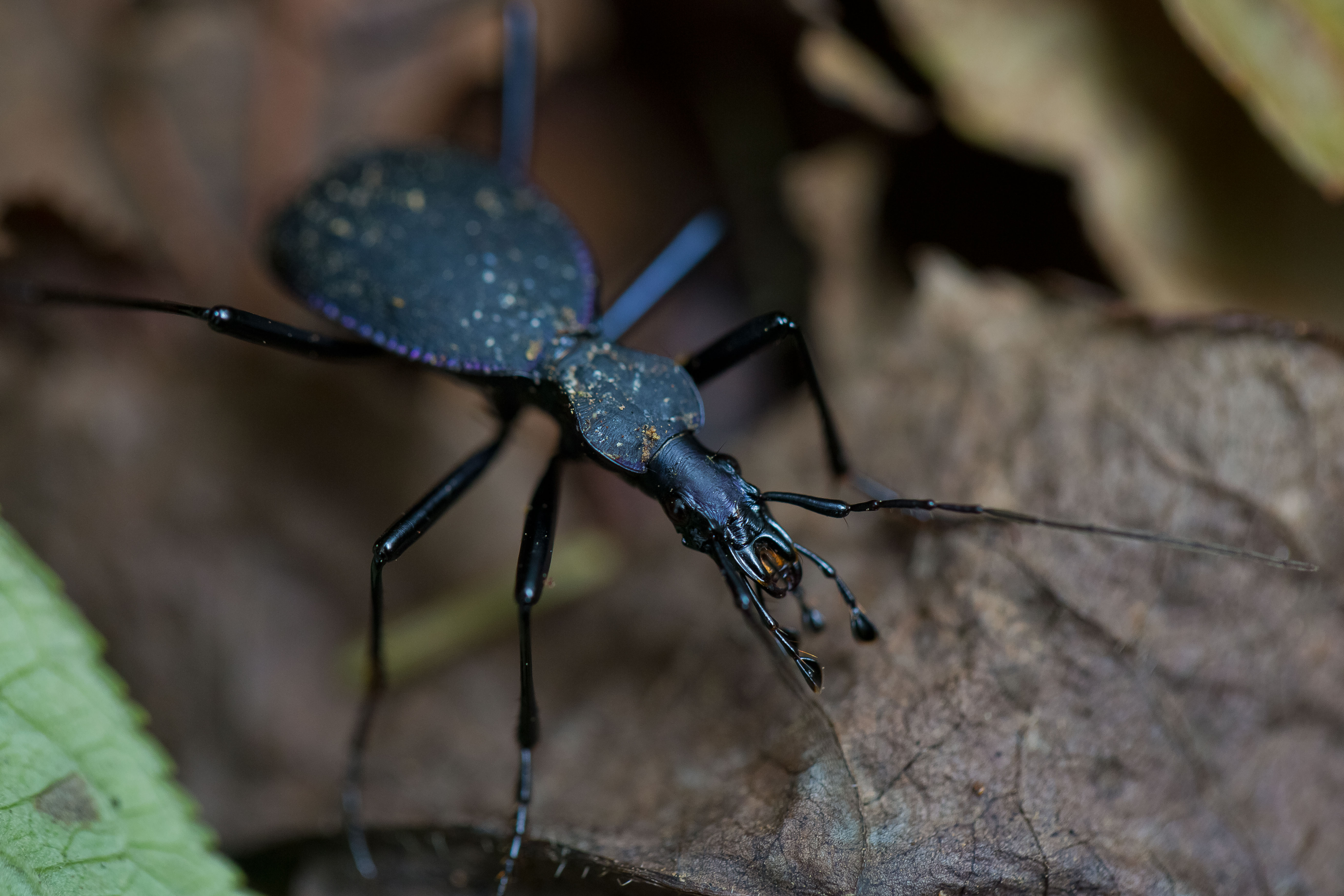
Scaphinotus angusticollis

== Species ==
These 59 species belong to the genus Scaphinotus:

- Brennus Motschulsky, 1866
  - Scaphinotus bullatus Van Dyke, 1924
  - Scaphinotus cordatus (LeConte, 1853)
  - Scaphinotus crenatus (Motschulsky, 1859)
  - Scaphinotus cristatus (T.W.Harris, 1839)
  - Scaphinotus interruptus (Ménétriés, 1843)
  - Scaphinotus johnsoni Van Dyke, 1924
  - Scaphinotus marginatus (Fischer von Waldheim, 1820)
  - Scaphinotus obliquus (LeConte, 1868)
  - Scaphinotus oreophilus (Rivers, 1890)
  - Scaphinotus punctatus (LeConte, 1859)
  - Scaphinotus riversi (Roeschke, 1907)
  - Scaphinotus rugiceps (G.Horn, 1872)
  - Scaphinotus striatopunctatus (Chaudoir, 1844)
  - Scaphinotus subtilis (Schaum, 1863)
  - Scaphinotus ventricosus (Dejean, 1831)
- Maronetus Casey, 1914
  - Scaphinotus debilis (LeConte, 1853)
  - Scaphinotus hoffmani (Barr, 2009)
  - Scaphinotus hubbardi (Schwarz, 1895)
  - Scaphinotus imperfectus (G.Horn, 1861)
  - Scaphinotus incompletus (Schwarz, 1895)
  - Scaphinotus reichlei (Barr, 2009)
  - Scaphinotus schwarzi (Beutenmüller, 1913)
  - Scaphinotus tenuis (Casey, 1914)
  - Scaphinotus unistriatus (Darlington, 1932)
- Neocychrus Roeschke, 1907
  - Scaphinotus angulatus (T.W.Harris, 1839)
  - Scaphinotus behrensi (Roeschke, 1907)
  - Scaphinotus longiceps Van Dyke, 1924 (Humboldt ground beetle)
- Nomaretus LeConte, 1853
  - Scaphinotus bilobus (Say, 1823)
  - Scaphinotus cavicollis (LeConte, 1859)
  - Scaphinotus fissicollis (LeConte, 1853)
  - Scaphinotus infletus Allen & Carlton, 1988
  - Scaphinotus liebecki Van Dyke, 1936
- Pseudonomaretus Roeschke, 1907
  - Scaphinotus mannii Wickham, 1919
  - Scaphinotus merkelii (G.Horn, 1890)
  - Scaphinotus regularis (LeConte, 1884)
  - Scaphinotus relictus (G.Horn, 1881)
- Scaphinotus Dejean, 1826
  - Scaphinotus elevatus (Fabricius, 1787)
  - Scaphinotus irregularis (Beutenmüller, 1903)
  - Scaphinotus kelloggi (Dury, 1912)
  - Scaphinotus macrogonus Bates, 1891
  - Scaphinotus mexicanus (Bates, 1882)
  - Scaphinotus parisiana Allen & Carlton, 1988
  - Scaphinotus petersi Roeschke, 1907
  - Scaphinotus snowi (LeConte, 1881)
  - Scaphinotus unicolor (Fabricius, 1787)
  - Scaphinotus vandykei Roeschke, 1907
  - Scaphinotus viduus (Dejean, 1826)
  - Scaphinotus webbi Bell, 1959
- Steniridia Casey, 1924
  - Scaphinotus aeneicollis (Beutenmüller, 1903)
  - Scaphinotus andrewsii (T.W.Harris, 1839)
  - Scaphinotus guyotii (LeConte, 1863)
  - Scaphinotus lodingi (Valentine, 1935)
  - Scaphinotus ridingsii (Bland, 1863)
  - Scaphinotus tricarinatus (Casey, 1914)
  - Scaphinotus violaceus (LeConte, 1863)
- Stenocantharus Gistel, 1834
  - Scaphinotus angusticollis (Mannerheim, 1823)
  - Scaphinotus hatchi Beer, 1971
  - Scaphinotus velutinus (Ménétriés, 1843)
- Subgenus not assigned
  - † Scaphinotus serus (Scudder, 1900)
