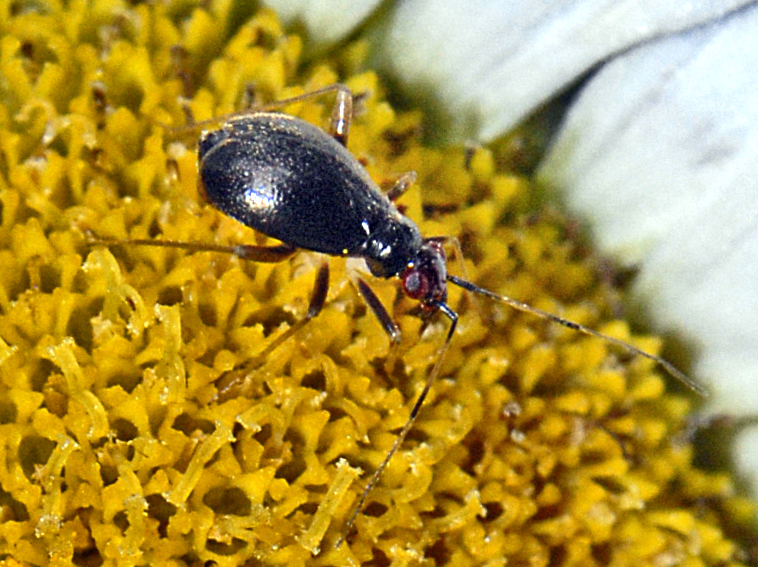
- Orthonotus rufifrons

Scientific classification
- Kingdom: Animalia
- Phylum: Arthropoda
- Class: Insecta
- Order: Hemiptera
- Suborder: Heteroptera
- Family: Miridae
- Tribe: Phylini
- Genus: Orthonotus; Stephens, 1829

= Orthonotus =

Genus of true bugs

Orthonotus is a genus of plant bugs belonging to the family Miridae.

== Species ==
- Orthonotus creticus Wagner, 1974
- Orthonotus cylindricollis (A. Costa, 1853)
- Orthonotus fraudatrix (Reuter, 1904)
- Orthonotus graecus Rieger, 1985
- Orthonotus longiceps (Reuter, 1883)
- Orthonotus magnieni Matocq, 2002
- Orthonotus ponticus (Horvath, 1888)
- Orthonotus pseudoponticus Josifov, 1964
- Orthonotus rossicus (Reuter, 1878)
- Orthonotus rufifrons (Fallen, 1807)
