= Scaphinotus ridingsii =

Scientific classification
- Kingdom: Animalia
- Phylum: Arthropoda
- Clade: Pancrustacea
- Class: Insecta
- Order: Coleoptera
- Suborder: Adephaga
- Family: Carabidae
- Genus: Scaphinotus
- Species: S. ridingsii

Binomial name
- Scaphinotus ridingsii (Bland, 1863)

Synonyms
- Cychrus ridingsii Bland, 1863; Irichroa tenuiceps Casey, 1920; Steniridia intermedia Valentine, 1935

Species of beetle

Scaphinotus ridingsii is a species of ground beetle in the family Carabidae. It is found in North America.

== Subspecies ==
These two subspecies belong to the species Scaphinotus ridingsii:

- Scaphinotus ridingsii monongahelae Leng, 1917 (Pennsylvania, West Virginia) - monongahela snail-eating beetle
- Scaphinotus ridingsii ridingsii (Bland, 1863) (Virginia) - Ridings' snail-eating beetle
