= Scaphinotus snowi =

Scientific classification
- Kingdom: Animalia
- Phylum: Arthropoda
- Clade: Pancrustacea
- Class: Insecta
- Order: Coleoptera
- Suborder: Adephaga
- Family: Carabidae
- Genus: Scaphinotus
- Species: S. snowi

Binomial name
- Scaphinotus snowi (LeConte, 1881)

Synonyms
- Cychrus snowi LeConte, 1881; Scaphinotus parkeri Van Dyke, 1938

Species of beetle

Scaphinotus snowi is a species of ground beetle in the family Carabidae. It is found in North America.

== Subspecies ==
These two subspecies belong to the species Scaphinotus snowi:

- Scaphinotus snowi roeschkei Van Dyke, 1907 (Arizona) - Roeschke’s snail-eating beetle
- Scaphinotus snowi snowi (LeConte, 1881) (Arizona, Colorado, New Mexico, Utah) - Snow’s snail-eating beetle
