= Scaphinotus andrewsii =

Scientific classification
- Kingdom: Animalia
- Phylum: Arthropoda
- Clade: Pancrustacea
- Class: Insecta
- Order: Coleoptera
- Suborder: Adephaga
- Family: Carabidae
- Genus: Scaphinotus
- Species: S. andrewsii

Binomial name
- Scaphinotus andrewsii (T. Harris, 1839)

Synonyms
- Cychrus andrewsii T.W.Harris, 1839; Irichroa amplicollis Casey, 1920; Irichroa reflexa Casey, 1924; Steniridia montana Valentine, 1935; Cychrus andrewsii T.W.Harris, 1839; Steniridia darlingtoni Valentine, 1935; Steniridia barksdalei Valentine, 1936; Steniridia nantahalae Valentine, 1936; Steniridia saludae Valentine, 1936; Cychrus germari Chaudoir, 1861; Irichroa mutabilis Casey, 1920; Irichroa longicollis Casey, 1920; Irichroa modulata Casey, 1920; Steniridia parvitarsalis Valentine, 1935; Steniridia waldensia Valentine, 1935

Species of beetle

Scaphinotus andrewsii is a ground beetle in the family Carabidae. It is found in North America, living in moist areas and primarily predate on snails.

They are known for their dark, black exoskeleton and somewhat elongated head and thorax.

== Subspecies ==
- S. andrewsii amplicollis (Casey, 1920) (North Carolina, Virginia) - wide-collared snail-eating beetle
- S. andrewsii andrewsii (T. Harris, 1839) (North Carolina) - Andrew's snail-eating beetle
- S. andrewsii darlingtoni (Valentine, 1935) (North Carolina, Tennessee) - Darlington's snail-eating beetle
- S. andrewsii germari (Chaudoir, 1861) (Kentucky, Tennessee, Virginia) - Germar's snail-eating beetle
- S. andrewsii mutabilis (Casey, 1920) (Kentucky, Ohio, Pennsylvania, West Virginia) - changeling snail-eating beetle
- S. andrewsii parvitarsalis (Valentine, 1935) (Georgia, North Carolina, Tennessee) - small-footed snail-eating beetle
- S. andrewsii waldensius (Valentine, 1935) (Tennessee) - Walden ridge snail-eating beetle
