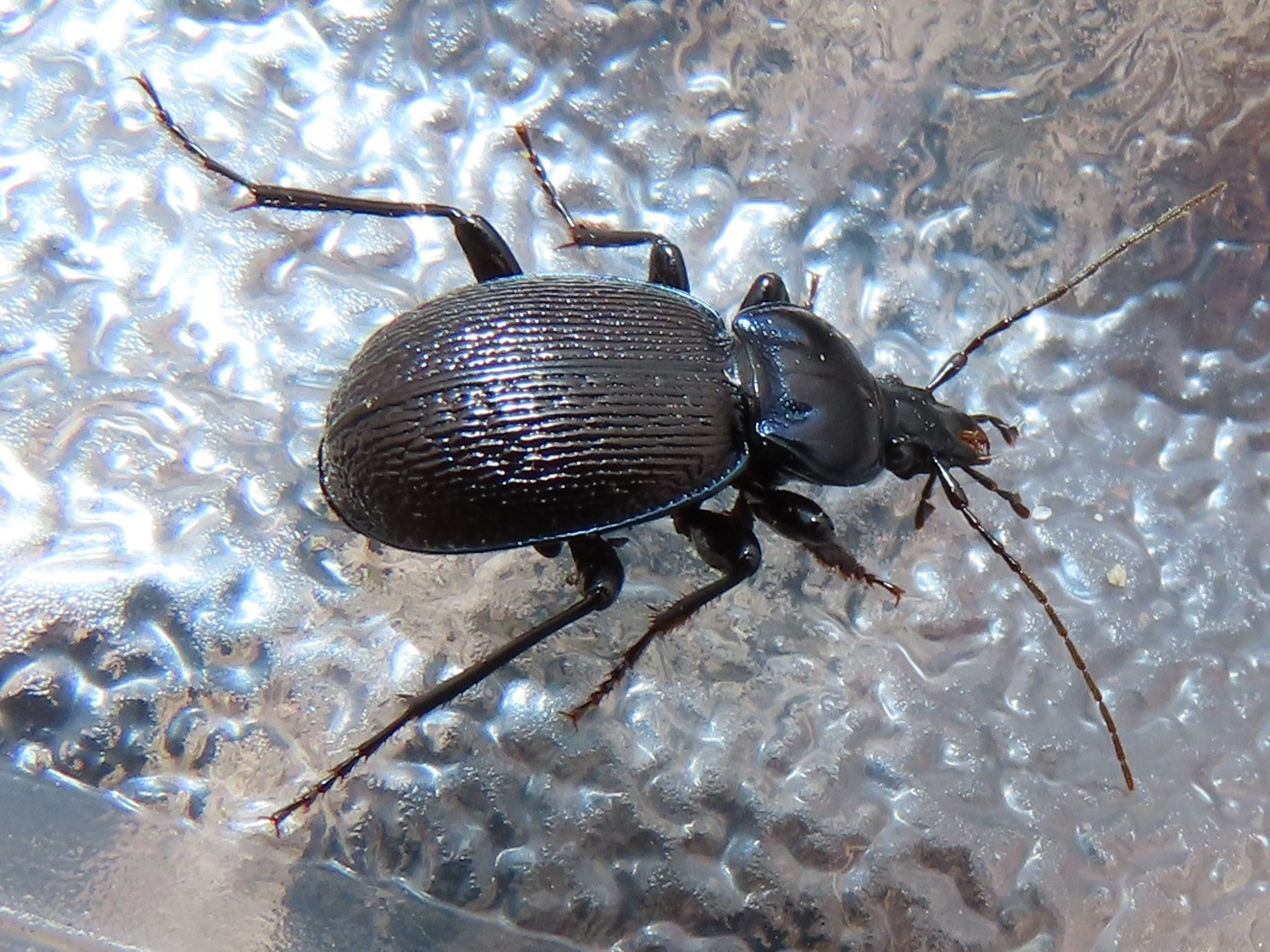

Scientific classification
- Domain: Eukaryota
- Kingdom: Animalia
- Phylum: Arthropoda
- Class: Insecta
- Order: Coleoptera
- Suborder: Adephaga
- Family: Carabidae
- Genus: Sphaeroderus
- Species: S. stenostomus

Binomial name
- Sphaeroderus stenostomus (Weber, 1801)

Synonyms
- Cychrus stenostomus Weber, 1801; Sphaeroderus diffractus Casey, 1914; Sphaeroderus niagarensis Laporte, 1833; Cychrus stenostomus Say, 1823

= Sphaeroderus stenostomus =

Species of beetle

Sphaeroderus stenostomus is a species of ground beetle in the family Carabidae. It is found in North America.

== Subspecies ==
These three subspecies belong to the species Sphaeroderus stenostomus:

- Sphaeroderus stenostomus aequalis Casey, 1920
- Sphaeroderus stenostomus lecontei Dejean, 1826 - LeConte's false snail-eating beetle
- Sphaeroderus stenostomus stenostomus (Weber, 1801) - narrow-mouthed false snail-eating beetle
