= Scaphinotus irregularis =

Scientific classification
- Kingdom: Animalia
- Phylum: Arthropoda
- Clade: Pancrustacea
- Class: Insecta
- Order: Coleoptera
- Suborder: Adephaga
- Family: Carabidae
- Genus: Scaphinotus
- Species: S. irregularis

Binomial name
- Scaphinotus irregularis (Beutenmüller, 1903)

Synonyms
- Cychrus irregularis Beutenmüller, 1903

Species of beetle

Scaphinotus irregularis is a species of ground beetle in the family Carabidae. It is found in North America, where it inhabits the southern Appalachian Mountains from south-western Virginia to north-western Georgia.
