= Scaphinotus petersi =

Scientific classification
- Kingdom: Animalia
- Phylum: Arthropoda
- Clade: Pancrustacea
- Class: Insecta
- Order: Coleoptera
- Suborder: Adephaga
- Family: Carabidae
- Genus: Scaphinotus
- Species: S. petersi

Binomial name
- Scaphinotus petersi Roeschke, 1907

Synonyms
- Scaphinotus petersi Roeschke, 1907; Cychrus corvus Fall, 1910

Species of beetle

Scaphinotus petersi is a species of ground beetle in the family Carabidae. It is found in North America.

== Subspecies ==
- Scaphinotus petersi biedermani Roeschke, 1907 (Arizona) - Biederman's snail-eating beetle
- Scaphinotus petersi catalinae Van Dyke, 1924 (Arizona) - Catalina Mountains snail-eating beetle
- Scaphinotus petersi corvus (Fall, 1910) (Arizona) - raven snail-eating beetle
- Scaphinotus petersi grahami Van Dyke, 1938 (Arizona) - Graham's snail-eating beetle
- Scaphinotus petersi kathleenae Ball, 1966 (Arizona) - Kay's snail-eating beetle
- Scaphinotus petersi petersi Roeschke, 1907 (Arizona) - Peters' snail-eating beetle
