= Scaphinotus debilis =

Scientific classification
- Kingdom: Animalia
- Phylum: Arthropoda
- Clade: Pancrustacea
- Class: Insecta
- Order: Coleoptera
- Suborder: Adephaga
- Family: Carabidae
- Genus: Scaphinotus
- Species: S. debilis

Binomial name
- Scaphinotus debilis (LeConte, 1853)

Synonyms
- Nomaretus debilis LeConte, 1853; Nomaretus alpinus Beutenmüller, 1903

Species of beetle

Scaphinotus debilis is a species of ground beetle in the family Carabidae. It is found in North America.

== Subspecies ==
These two subspecies belong to the species Scaphinotus debilis:

- Scaphinotus debilis alpinus (Beutenmüller, 1903) (North Carolina) - alpine thorax snail-eating beetle
- Scaphinotus debilis debilis (North Carolina) (Georgia, North Carolina, South Carolina) - weakly thorax snail-eating beetle
