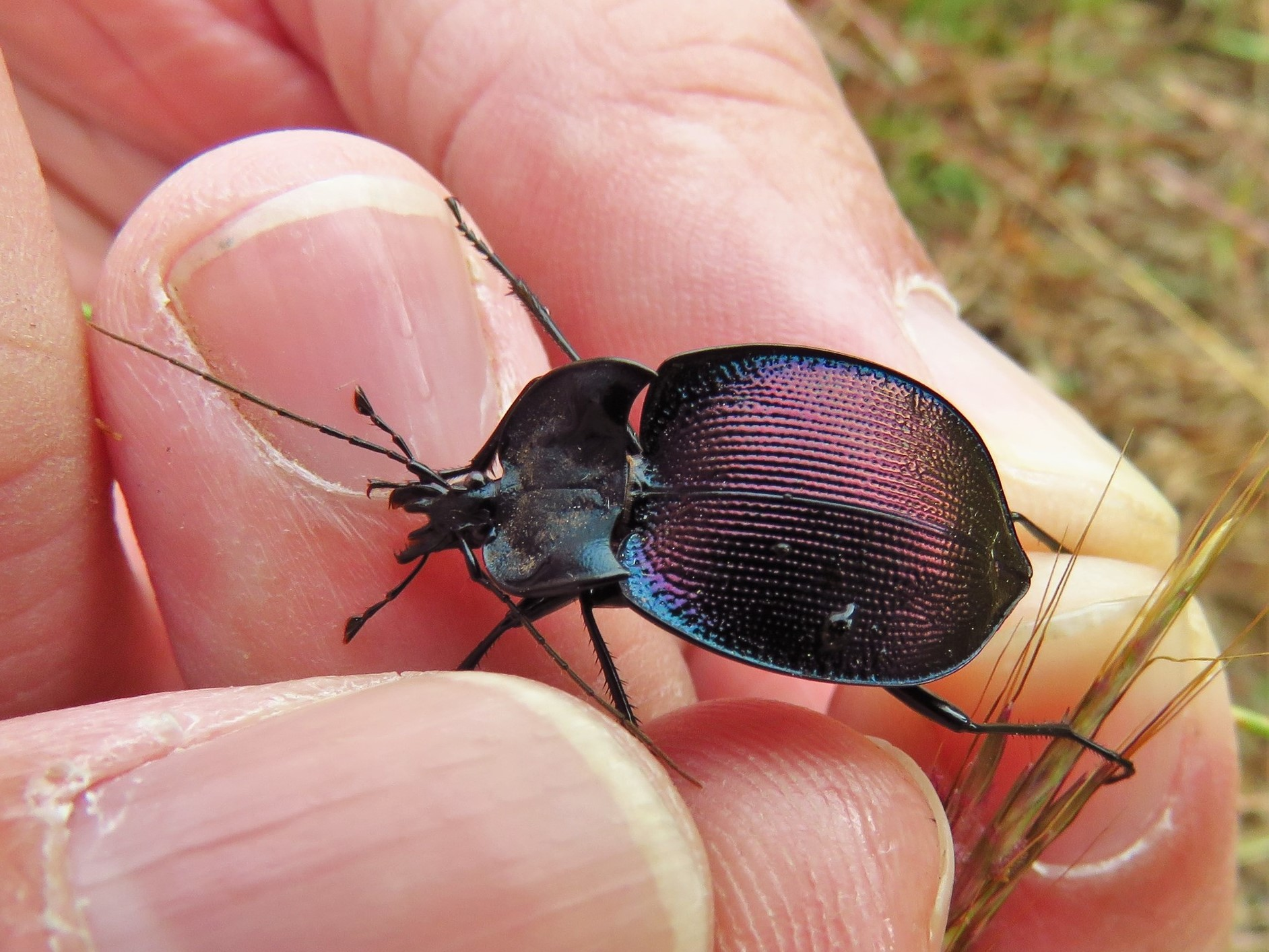

Scientific classification
- Kingdom: Animalia
- Phylum: Arthropoda
- Clade: Pancrustacea
- Class: Insecta
- Order: Coleoptera
- Suborder: Adephaga
- Family: Carabidae
- Genus: Scaphinotus
- Species: S. elevatus

Binomial name
- Scaphinotus elevatus (Fabricius, 1787)

Synonyms
- Carabus elevatus Fabricius, 1787; Cychrus dilatatus LeConte, 1853

= Scaphinotus elevatus =

Species of beetle

Scaphinotus elevatus, the eastern snail eater, is a species of ground beetle in the family Carabidae. It is found in North America.

== Subspecies ==
These six subspecies belong to the species Scaphinotus elevatus:

- Scaphinotus elevatus coloradensis Van Dyke, 1907 (Colorado, Iowa, Minnesota, Nebraska, New Mexico, South Dakota) - Colorado snail-eating beetle
- Scaphinotus elevatus elevatus (Fabricius, 1787) (Alabama, Connecticut, Delaware, Florida, Louisiana, Massachusetts, Maryland, Maine, Mississippi, North Carolina, New Hampshire, New Jersey, New York, Pennsylvania, Rhode Island, South Carolina) - elevated thorax snail-eating beetle
- Scaphinotus elevatus flammeus Haldeman, 1844 (Arkansas, Iowa, Illinois, Indiana, Kansas, Missouri, Nebraska, Ohio, Tennessee) - fiery snail-eating beetle
- Scaphinotus elevatus lengi Van Dyke, 1938 (Virginia) - Leng's snail-eating beetle
- Scaphinotus elevatus neomexicanus Van Dyke, 1924 (New Mexico) - New Mexico snail-eating beetle
- Scaphinotus elevatus tenebricosus Roeschke, 1907 (North Carolina, South Carolina, Virginia) - perforate snail-eating beetle
