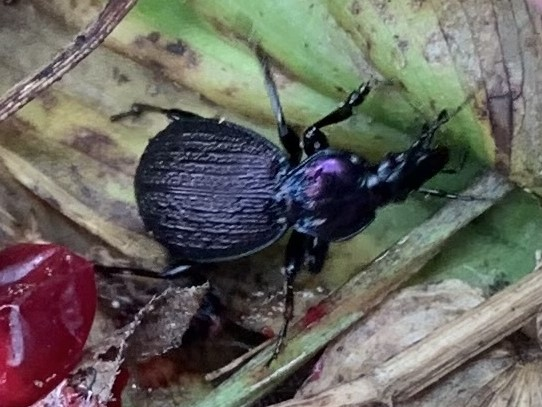

Scientific classification
- Kingdom: Animalia
- Phylum: Arthropoda
- Clade: Pancrustacea
- Class: Insecta
- Order: Coleoptera
- Suborder: Adephaga
- Family: Carabidae
- Genus: Sphaeroderus
- Species: S. nitidicollis

Binomial name
- Sphaeroderus nitidicollis Guérin-Méneville, 1829

Synonyms
- Sphaeroderus granulosus Chaudoir, 1861; Sphaeroderus schaumii Chaudoir, 1861

= Sphaeroderus nitidicollis =

Species of beetle

Sphaeroderus nitidicollis is a species of ground beetle in the family Carabidae. It is found in North America.

== Subspecies ==
These three subspecies belong to the species Sphaeroderus nitidicollis:

- Sphaeroderus nitidicollis brevoorti LeConte, 1847 (Manitoba, New Brunswick, Nova Scotia, Ontario, Quebec, Maine, Minnesota, New Hampshire, New York, Vermont) - Breedevoort's false snail-eating beetle
- Sphaeroderus nitidicollis nitidicollis Guérin-Ménéville, 1829 (Newfoundland, Quebec) - polished-collar false snail-eating beetle

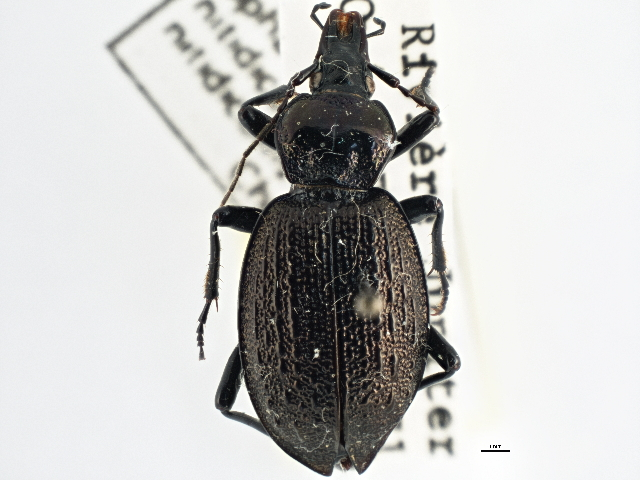
Sphaeroderus nitidicollis nitidicollis

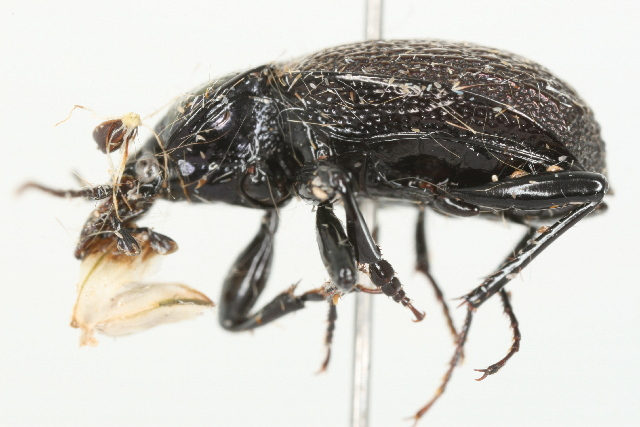
Sphaeroderus nitidicollis brevoorti
