= Scaphinotus reichlei =

Scientific classification
- Kingdom: Animalia
- Phylum: Arthropoda
- Clade: Pancrustacea
- Class: Insecta
- Order: Coleoptera
- Suborder: Adephaga
- Family: Carabidae
- Genus: Scaphinotus
- Species: S. reichlei

Binomial name
- Scaphinotus reichlei (Barr, 2009)

Synonyms
- Maronetus reichlei Barr, 2009

Species of beetle

Scaphinotus reichlei is a species of beetle of the Carabidae family. This species is known only from known from two specimens collected in Cumberland and Anderson Counties in eastern Tennessee.
