= Scaphinotus hoffmani =

Scientific classification
- Kingdom: Animalia
- Phylum: Arthropoda
- Clade: Pancrustacea
- Class: Insecta
- Order: Coleoptera
- Suborder: Adephaga
- Family: Carabidae
- Genus: Scaphinotus
- Species: S. hoffmani

Binomial name
- Scaphinotus hoffmani (Barr, 2009)

Species of beetle

Scaphinotus hoffmani is a species of ground beetle in the family Carabidae. It is found in North America.
