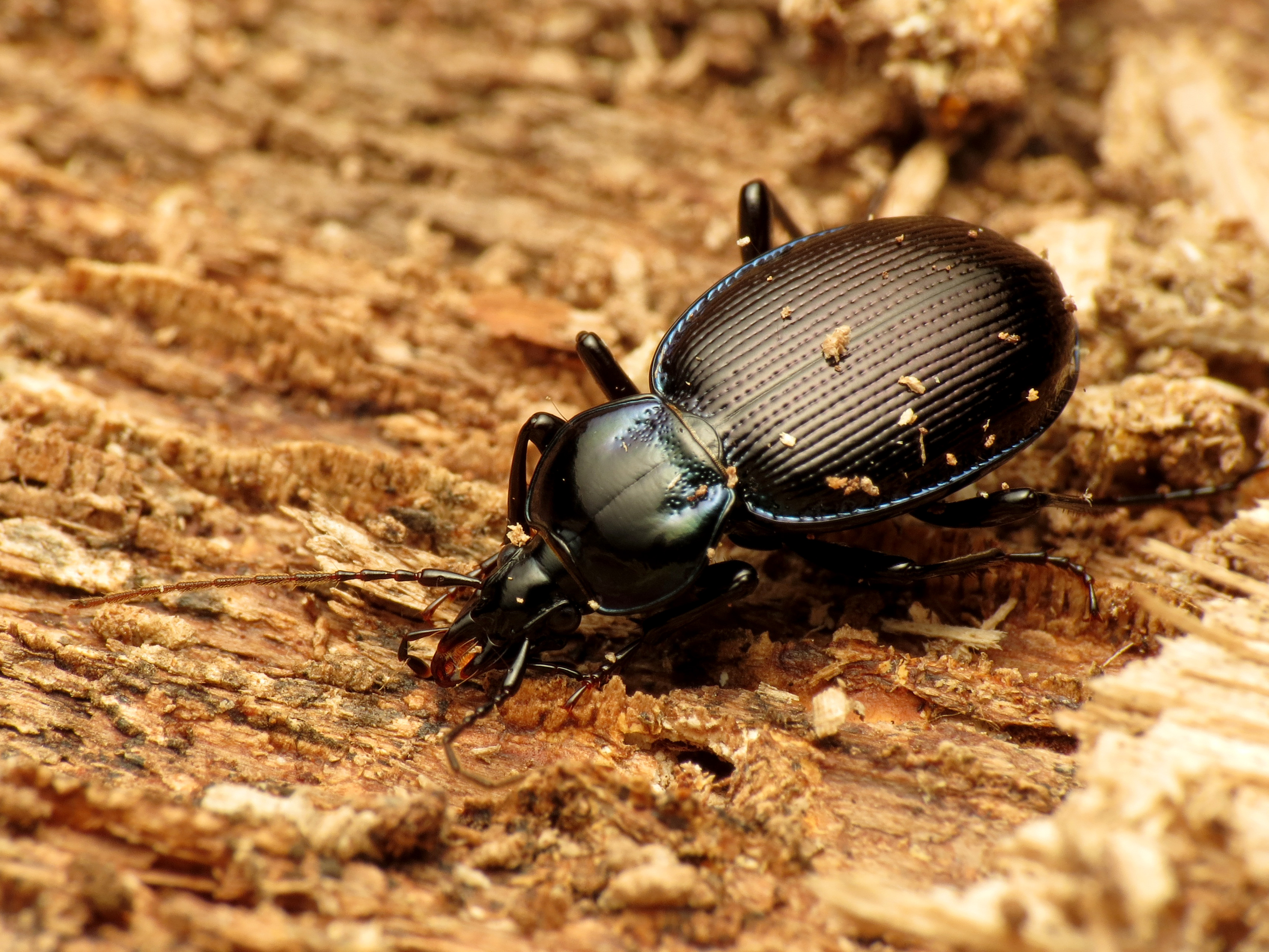

Scientific classification
- Kingdom: Animalia
- Phylum: Arthropoda
- Class: Insecta
- Order: Coleoptera
- Suborder: Adephaga
- Family: Carabidae
- Tribe: Cychrini
- Genus: Sphaeroderus; Dejean, 1831

= Sphaeroderus =

Genus of beetles

Sphaeroderus is a genus of beetles in the family Carabidae, found in North America. The genus contains the following species:

- Sphaeroderus bicarinatus (LeConte, 1853)
- Sphaeroderus canadensis Chaudoir, 1861
- Sphaeroderus indianae (Blatchley, 1910)
- Sphaeroderus nitidicollis Guérin-Méneville, 1829
- Sphaeroderus schaumii Chaudoir, 1861 (Schaum's ground beetle)
- Sphaeroderus stenostomus (Weber, 1801)
