= Brachyptery =

Condition of an animal having short wings

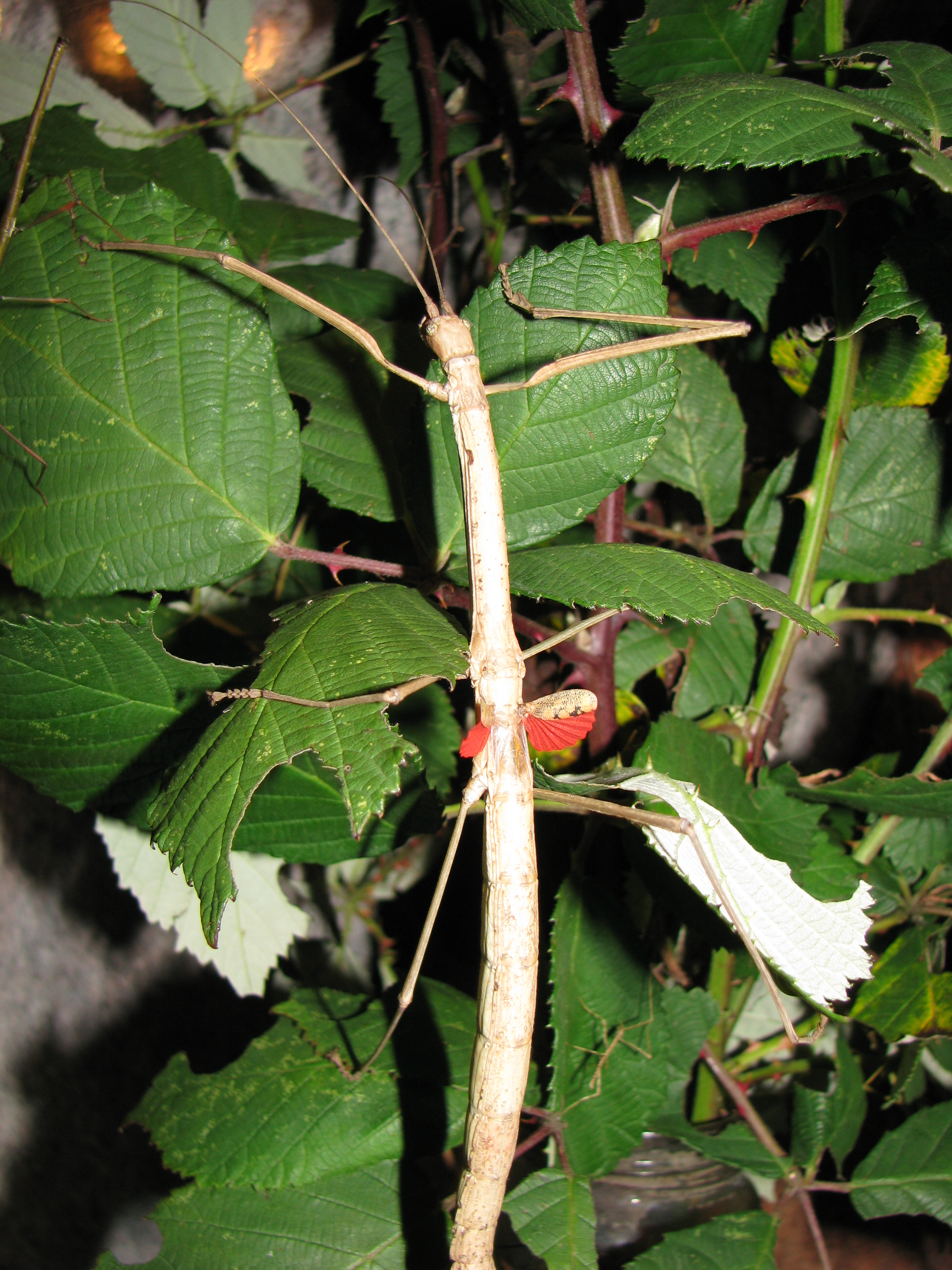
Aposematic display of flightless stick insect with brachypterous wings

Brachyptery is an anatomical condition in which an animal has very reduced wings. Such animals or their wings may be described as "brachypterous". Another descriptor for very small wings is microptery. Brachypterous wings generally are not functional as organs of flight and often seem to be totally functionless and vestigial. In some species, however, flightless wings may have other functions, such as aposematic display in some Orthoptera and Phasmatodea. Brachyptery occurs commonly among insects. An insect species might evolve towards brachyptery by reducing its flight muscles and their associated energy demands, or by avoiding the hazards of flight in windy conditions on oceanic islands, in which flying insects are prone to drowning. Brachyptery also is common in ectoparasitic insects that have no use for wings, and inquiline insects with socially parasitic life strategies that do not require functional wings.

Pterostichus melanarius is an example of an insect beetle species that exhibits brachyptery. The brachypterous beetles of P. melanarius become the more common morph in the population once the beetles have established their home in a new population.

In some species of insects, brachyptery occurs in some members (say in only one sex, or only some castes), whereas fully functional wings occur in macropterous individuals. When brachyptery is sex-specific, females are often the sex with reduced wings, including reduced wing musculature. This may be to free energy for reproduction, or may be because some insect males (such as cockroaches) use their wings in courtship displays. Other forms of brachyptery may depend on the temperature at which the insect grew and developed. In winter, for example, some species of aphids grow reduced wings, whereas in summer they grow fully developed wings. Some animals, like fleas and worker ants, display an extreme form of brachyptery called aptery, in which no wings grow at all.

== See also ==
- Aptery (no wings)
- Flightless bird (including birds with reduced, ornamental or non-functional wings)
