= Deltaspis auromarginata =

Scientific classification
- Domain: Eukaryota
- Kingdom: Animalia
- Phylum: Arthropoda
- Class: Insecta
- Order: Coleoptera
- Suborder: Polyphaga
- Infraorder: Cucujiformia
- Family: Cerambycidae
- Genus: Deltaspis
- Species: D. auromarginata

Binomial name
- Deltaspis auromarginata Audinet-Serville, 1834

Species of beetle

Deltaspis auromarginata is a species of beetle in the family Cerambycidae. It was described by Audinet-Serville in 1834.
