= Cosmotomidius =

Scientific classification
- Kingdom: Animalia
- Phylum: Arthropoda
- Class: Insecta
- Order: Coleoptera
- Suborder: Polyphaga
- Infraorder: Cucujiformia
- Family: Cerambycidae
- Subfamily: Lamiinae
- Tribe: Acanthoderini
- Genus: Cosmotomidius; Melzer, 1931

Genus of beetles

Cosmotomidius is a genus of longhorn beetles of the subfamily Lamiinae, containing the following species:

== Species ==
- Cosmotomidius cacaoensis Touroult & al., 2010
- Cosmotomidius crudiaphilus Touroult & al., 2010
- Cosmotomidius egregius (Martins & Galileo, 2007)
- Cosmotomidius elongatus Touroult & al., 2010
- Cosmotomidius morvanae Touroult & al., 2010
- Cosmotomidius nigrisetosus Touroult & al., 2010
- Cosmotomidius setosus (Audinet-Serville, 1835)
- Cosmotomidius vincus Machado & Monné, 2009
