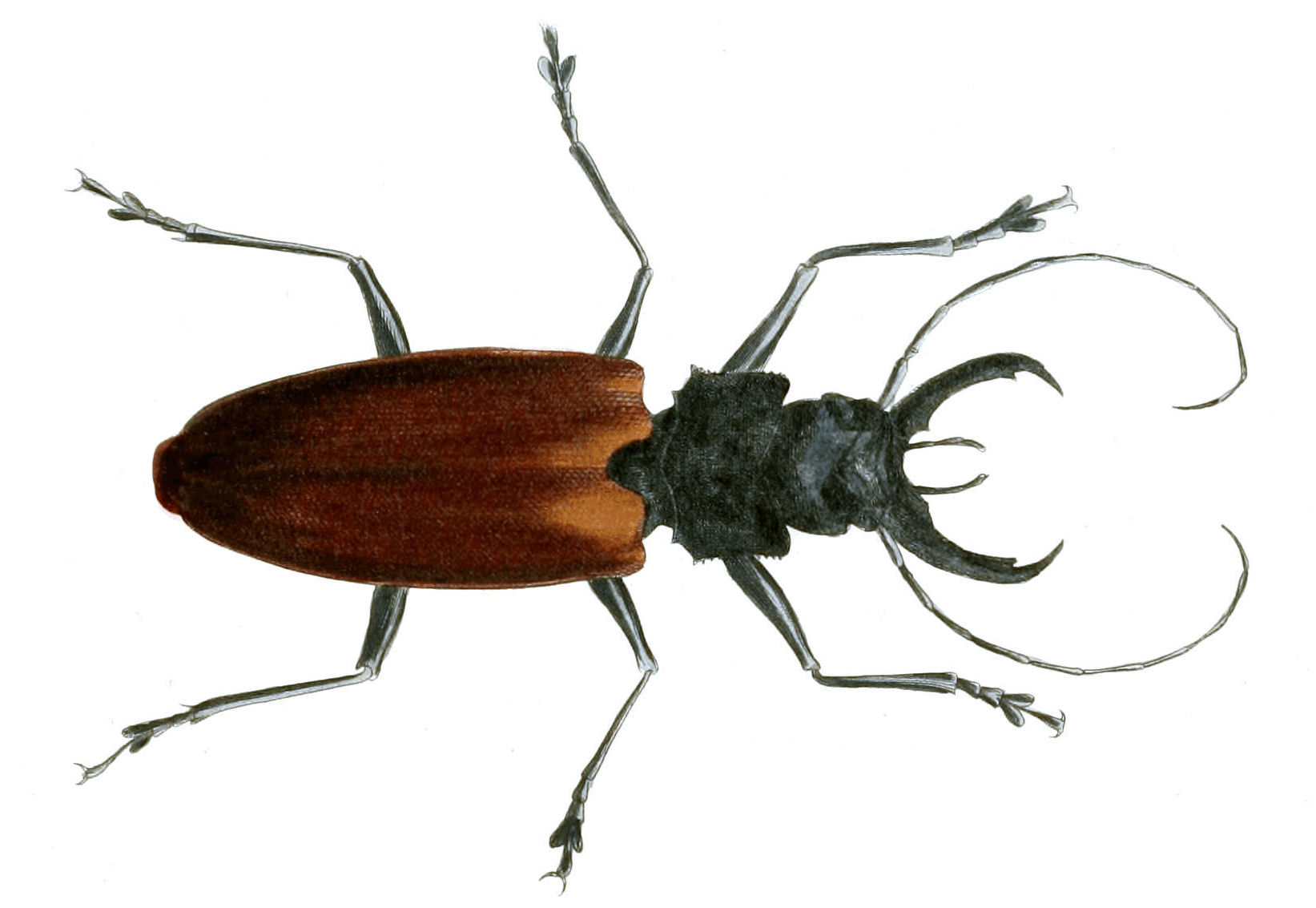
- Stenodontes damicornis

Scientific classification
- Domain: Eukaryota
- Kingdom: Animalia
- Phylum: Arthropoda
- Class: Insecta
- Order: Coleoptera
- Suborder: Polyphaga
- Infraorder: Cucujiformia
- Family: Cerambycidae
- Subfamily: Prioninae
- Tribe: Mallodontini
- Genus: Stenodontes; Audinet-Serville, 1832

= Stenodontes =

Genus of beetles

Stenodontes is a genus of beetles in the family Cerambycidae, containing the following species:

- Stenodontes chevrolati Gahan, 1890
- Stenodontes damicornis (Linnaeus, 1771)
- Stenodontes exsertus (Olivier, 1795)
