= Carabus pyrenaeus =

Scientific classification
- Domain: Eukaryota
- Kingdom: Animalia
- Phylum: Arthropoda
- Class: Insecta
- Order: Coleoptera
- Suborder: Adephaga
- Family: Carabidae
- Genus: Carabus
- Species: C. pyrenaeus

Binomial name
- Carabus pyrenaeus Audinet-Serville, 1821

Species of beetle

Carabus pyrenaeus is a species of ground beetle in the Iniopachus subgenus, that can be found in Andorra, France, and Spain.
