= Cosmotomidius setosus =

Scientific classification
- Kingdom: Animalia
- Phylum: Arthropoda
- Class: Insecta
- Order: Coleoptera
- Suborder: Polyphaga
- Infraorder: Cucujiformia
- Family: Cerambycidae
- Genus: Cosmotomidius
- Species: C. setosus

Binomial name
- Cosmotomidius setosus (Audinet-Serville, 1835)

Synonyms
- Exocentrus setosus White, 1855; Pogonocherus setosus Audinet-Serville, 1834

Species of beetle

Cosmotomidius setosus is a species of beetle in the family Cerambycidae. It was described by Audinet-Serville in 1835. It is known from Paraguay, Argentina and Brazil. It measures between 5.3 to 7.4 mm (0.21 to 0.29 in).
