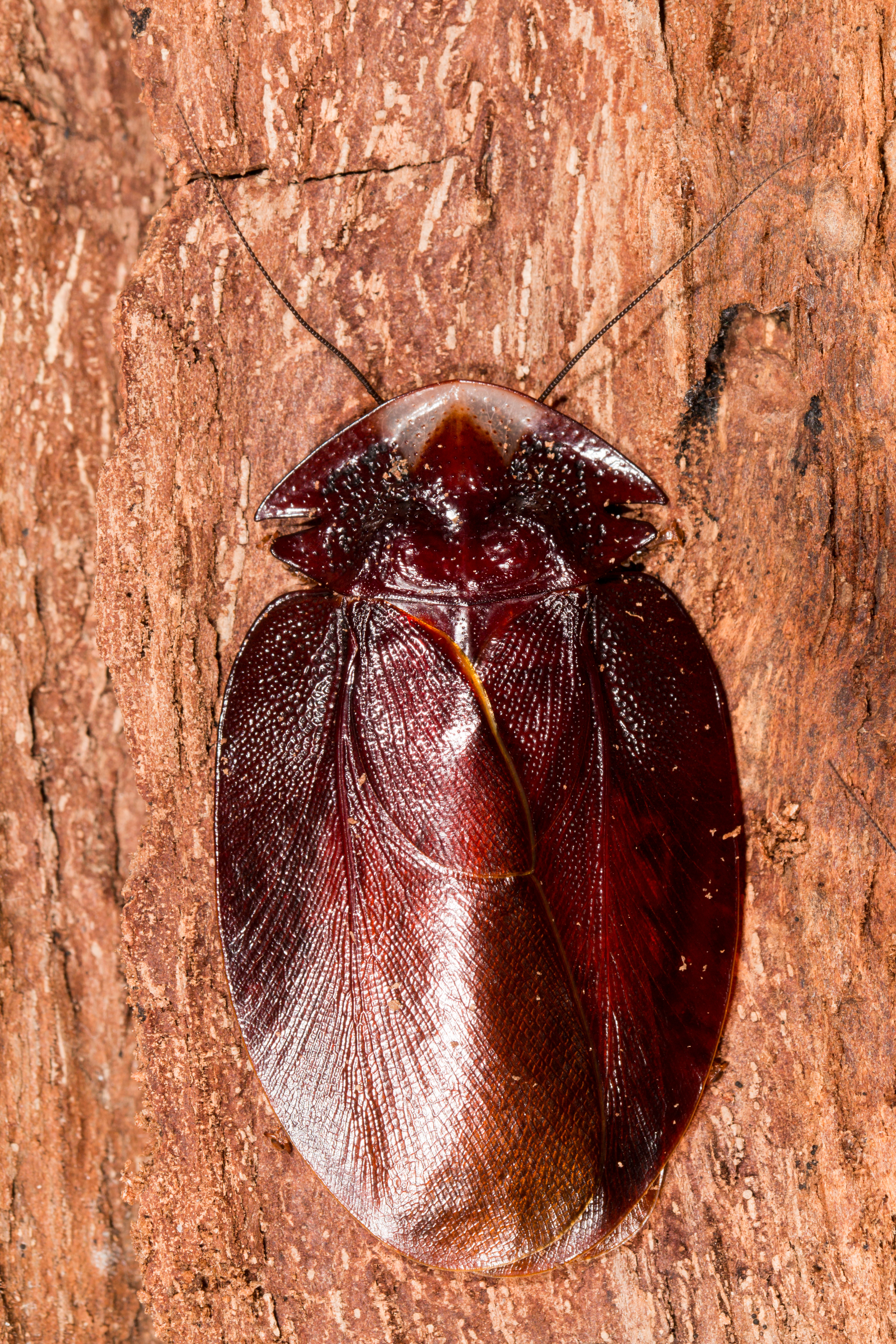

Scientific classification
- Kingdom: Animalia
- Phylum: Arthropoda
- Clade: Pancrustacea
- Class: Insecta
- Order: Blattodea
- Family: Blaberidae
- Genus: Schizopilia
- Species: S. fissicollis

Binomial name
- Schizopilia fissicollis Serville, 1839

= Schizopilia fissicollis =

Species of cockroach

Schizopilia fissicollis is a species of cockroach living in Suriname and French Guiana.

== Biology ==
Schizopilia fissicollis is a neotropical cockroach species that lives on under loose bark of trunks of dead trees.

Its flattened body structure allow it to live in crevices and narrow places under (partially) loose bark. It also protects them from predators like ants. By adhering firmly to the underground, the extensions at the tergum are pushed on the substrate, allowing no room for ants and minimizing the attack surface.

Adults have large rounded wings that extend over the abdomen. The eyes are rather small, directed frontal and lateral with a more or less translucent area in the pronotum above the eyes.

The upper side of the body (pronotum, mesothorax and metathorax and abdomen) of the nymphs is covered with tubercles, giving it a rough appearance. In adults, the pronotum is smooth and shining and the lateral posterior edges of the pronotum are bifurcated, resulting in two lobes.

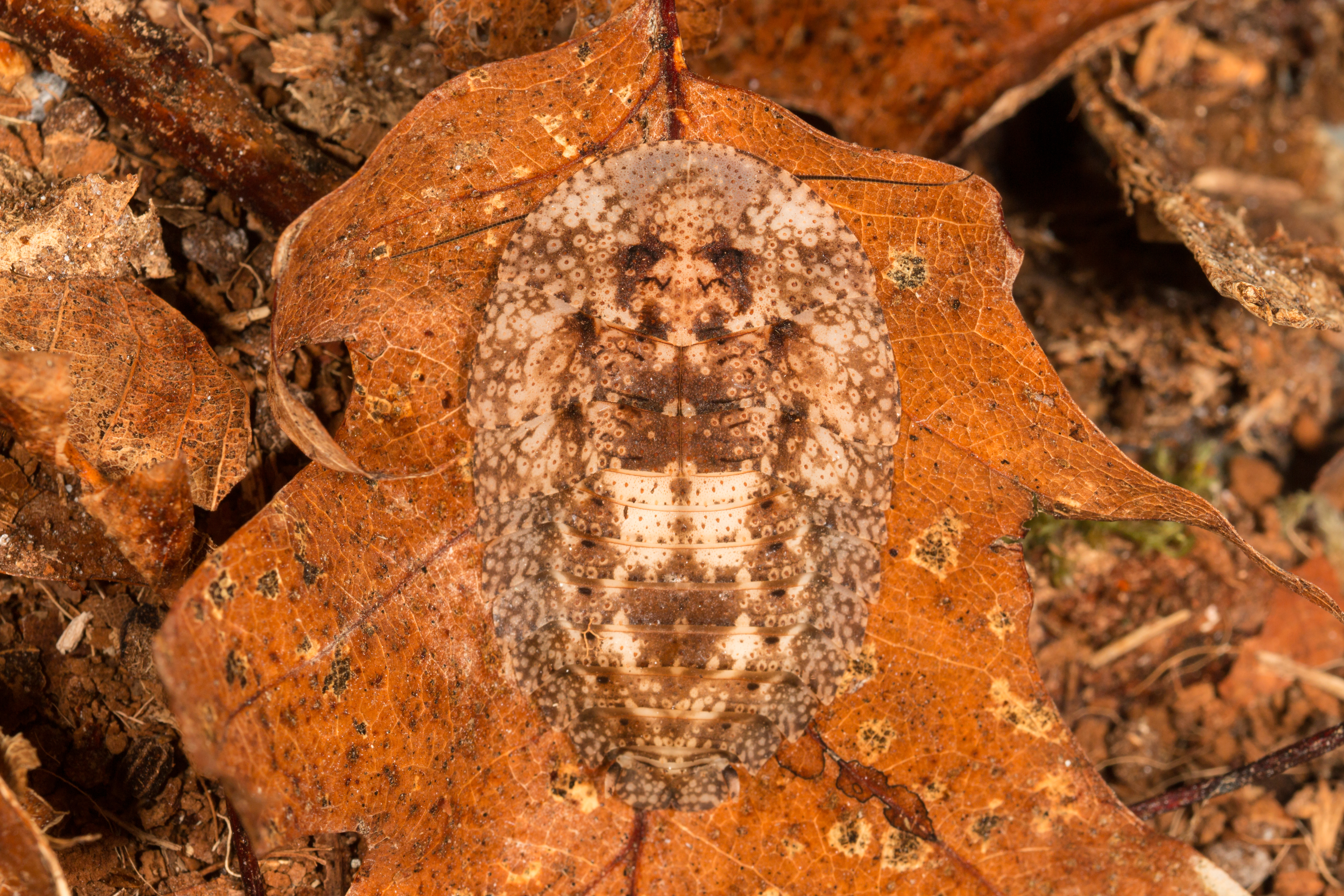
Nymph hiding on a leave

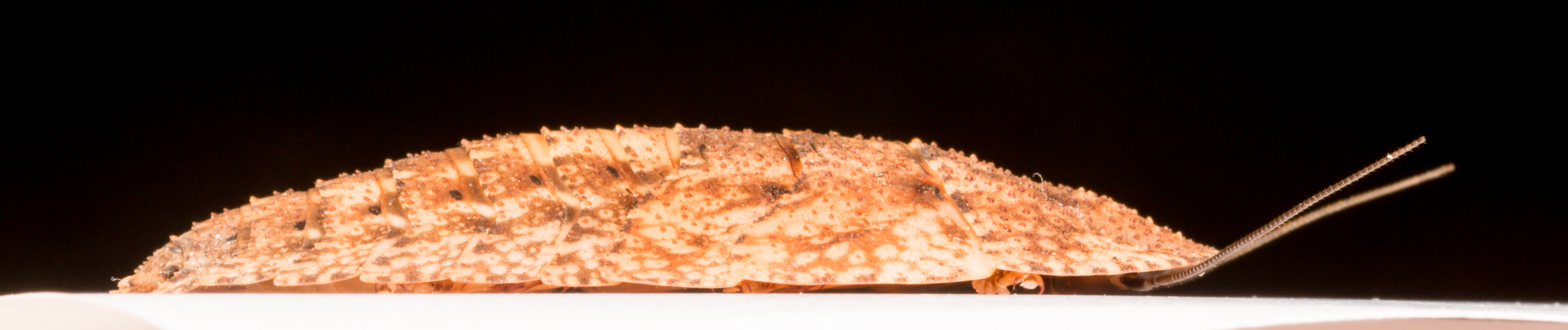
The flattened body shape.

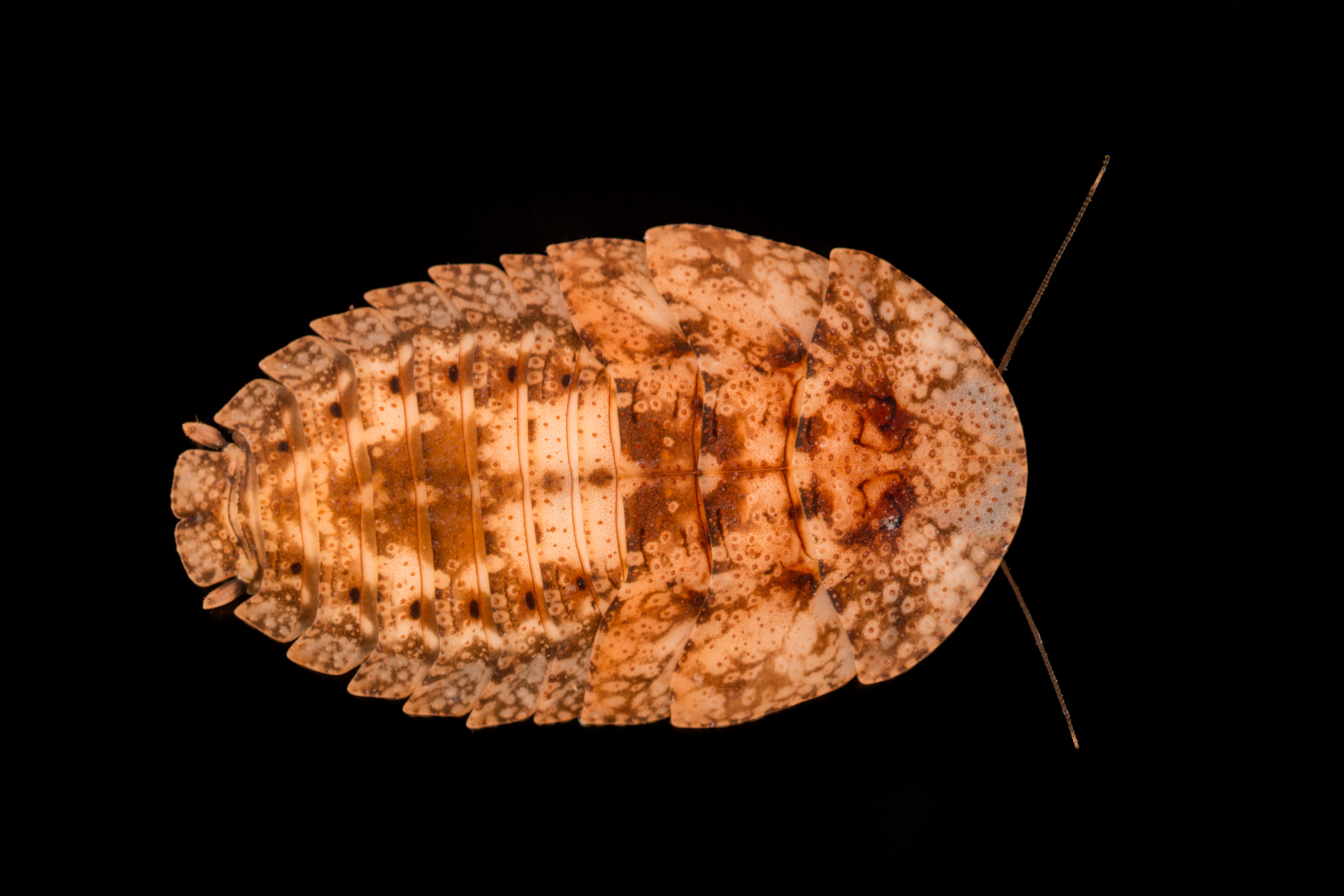
Top view of a nymph. Notice that nymphs do not have the extensions at the pronotum like the adults do.

== Reproduction ==
Like other members of the subfamily Zetoborinae, Schizopilia fissicollis is an ovoviviparous cockroach. Eggs are kept inside the abdomen of the mother until they hatch. It's not known if Schizopilia fissicollis exhibits social interactions between mother and offspring or between siblings, as described in some related Zetoborinae cockroaches.
