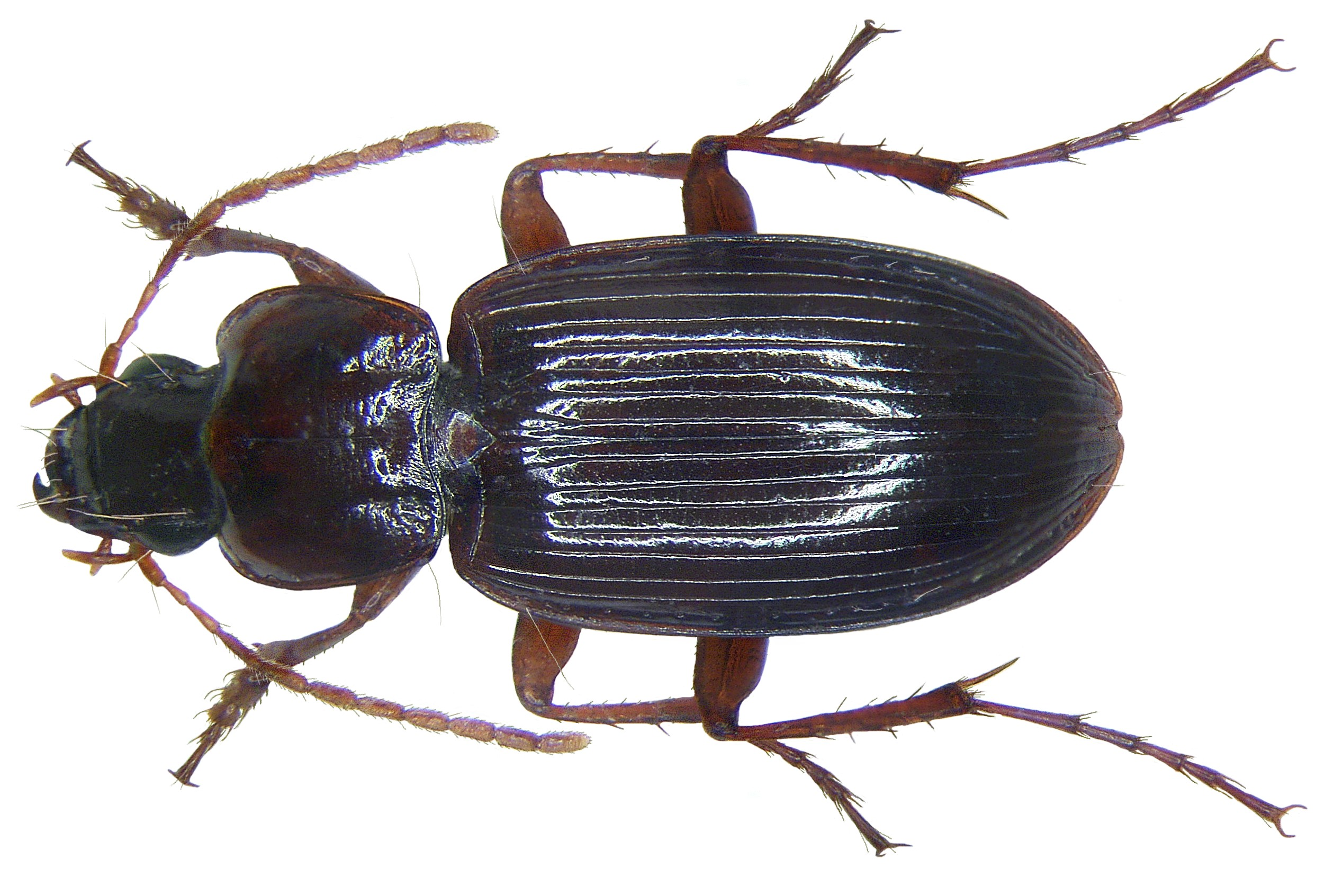

Scientific classification
- Kingdom: Animalia
- Phylum: Arthropoda
- Clade: Pancrustacea
- Class: Insecta
- Order: Coleoptera
- Suborder: Adephaga
- Family: Carabidae
- Genus: Platyderus
- Species: P. depressus

Binomial name
- Platyderus depressus (Audinet-Serville, 1821)

= Platyderus depressus =

Species of beetle

Platyderus depressus is a species of ground beetle native to Europe.
