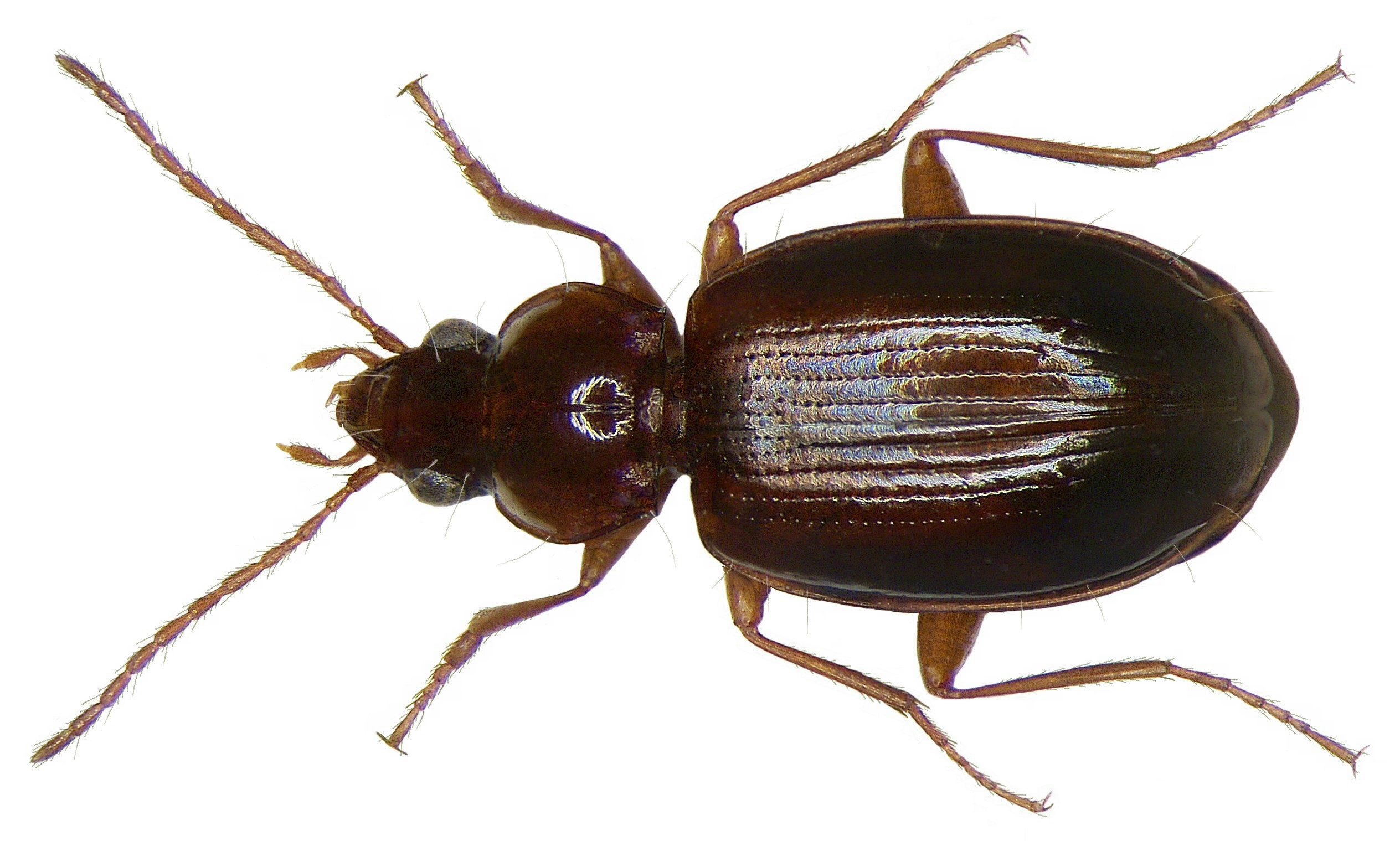

Scientific classification
- Kingdom: Animalia
- Phylum: Arthropoda
- Class: Insecta
- Order: Coleoptera
- Suborder: Adephaga
- Family: Carabidae
- Genus: Ocys
- Species: O. harpaloides

Binomial name
- Ocys harpaloides (Audinet-Serville, 1821)

= Ocys harpaloides =

Species of beetle

Ocys harpaloides is a species of ground beetle native to Europe.
