= Achille Guenée =

French lawyer and entomologist

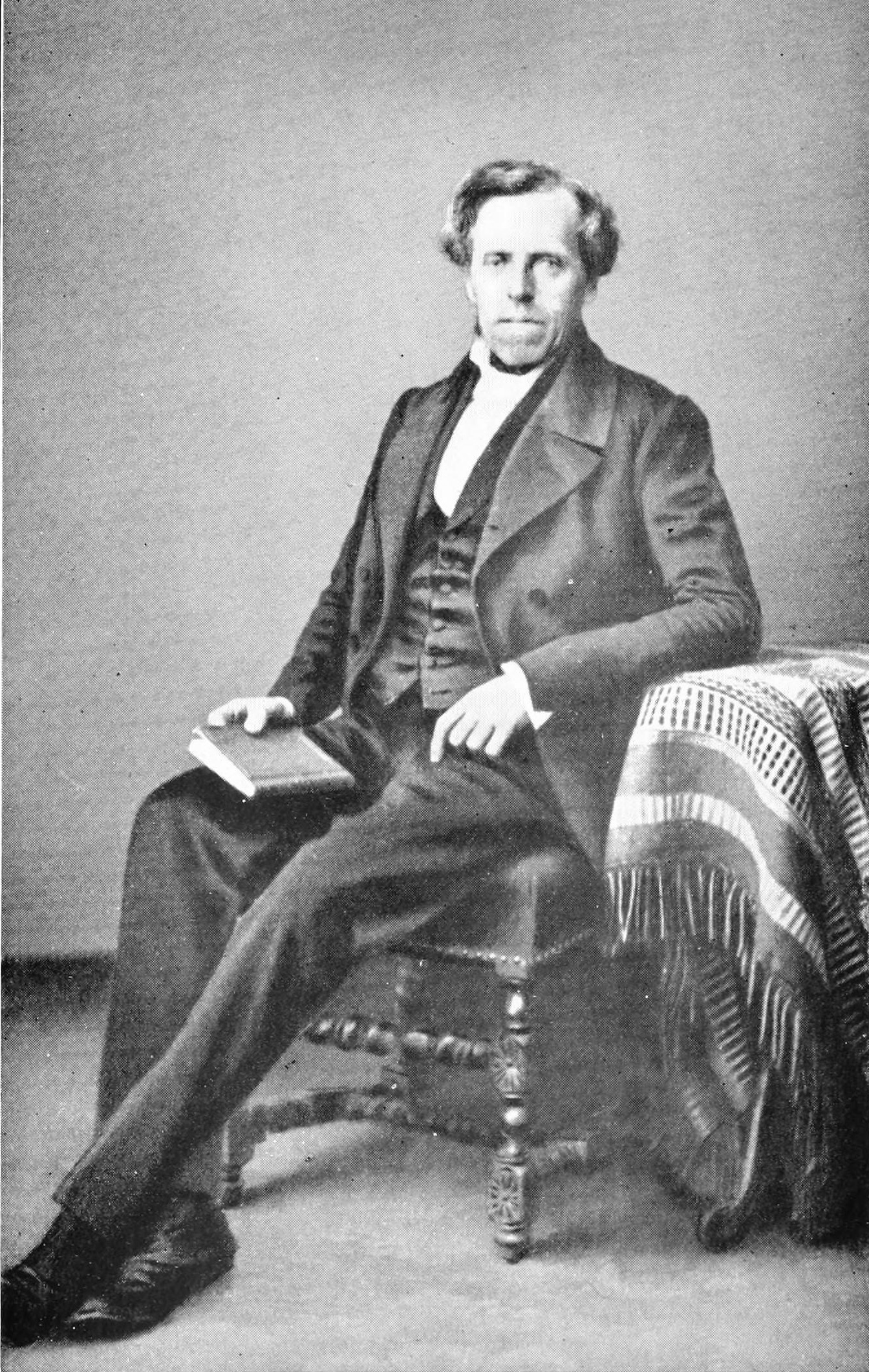
- Born: 1 January 1809; Chartres, France
- Died: 30 December 1880 (aged 71); Châteaudun, France
- Occupation: lawyer

Academic work
- Discipline: entomology
- Sub-discipline: lepidopterology
- Notable works: Species des nocturnes

Achille Guenée (sometimes M.A. Guenée; 1 January 1809 – 30 December 1880) was a French lawyer and entomologist.

== Biography ==
Achille Guenée was born in Chartres and died in Châteaudun.

He was educated in Chartres, where he showed a very early interest in butterflies and was encouraged and taught by François de Villiers. He went to study law in Paris, then entered the "Bareau". After the death of his only son, he lived at Châteaudun in Chatelliers. During the Franco-Prussian War of 1870, Châteaudun was burned by the Prussians but Guénée's collections remained intact.

He was the author of 63 publications, some with Philogène Auguste Joseph Duponchel. He notably wrote Species des nocturnes (Night Species in English) (six volumes, 1852–1857) forming parts of the Suites à Buffon. This work of almost 1,300 pages treats Noctuidae of the world. He was also co-author, with Jean Baptiste Boisduval, of Histoire naturelle des Insectes. Species général des Lépidoptères (vols 5–10, 1836–57).

He was a founding member 1832 of the Société Entomologique de France, (1832) and was president in 1848 then honorary member in 1874. He was among the first to describe the Cadra calidella species.
