= Cosmotomidius elongatus =

Scientific classification
- Kingdom: Animalia
- Phylum: Arthropoda
- Class: Insecta
- Order: Coleoptera
- Suborder: Polyphaga
- Infraorder: Cucujiformia
- Family: Cerambycidae
- Genus: Cosmotomidius
- Species: C. elongatus

Binomial name
- Cosmotomidius elongatus Touroult & al., 2010

Species of beetle

Cosmotomidius elongatus is a species of beetle in the family Cerambycidae. It was described by Touroult et al. in 2010. It is known from French Guiana.
