= Deltaspis disparilis =

Scientific classification
- Domain: Eukaryota
- Kingdom: Animalia
- Phylum: Arthropoda
- Class: Insecta
- Order: Coleoptera
- Suborder: Polyphaga
- Infraorder: Cucujiformia
- Family: Cerambycidae
- Genus: Deltaspis
- Species: D. disparilis

Binomial name
- Deltaspis disparilis Bates, 1891

Species of beetle

Deltaspis disparilis is a species of beetle in the family Cerambycidae. It was described by Bates in 1891.
