= Cosmotomidius egregius =

Scientific classification
- Kingdom: Animalia
- Phylum: Arthropoda
- Class: Insecta
- Order: Coleoptera
- Suborder: Polyphaga
- Infraorder: Cucujiformia
- Family: Cerambycidae
- Genus: Cosmotomidius
- Species: C. egregius

Binomial name
- Cosmotomidius egregius (Martins & Galileo, 2007)

Synonyms
- Zikanita egregia Martins & Galileo, 2007

Species of beetle

Cosmotomidius egregius is a species of beetle in the family Cerambycidae. It was described by Martins and Galileo in 2007. It is known from Bolivia.
