= Cosmotomidius vincus =

Scientific classification
- Kingdom: Animalia
- Phylum: Arthropoda
- Class: Insecta
- Order: Coleoptera
- Suborder: Polyphaga
- Infraorder: Cucujiformia
- Family: Cerambycidae
- Genus: Cosmotomidius
- Species: C. vincus

Binomial name
- Cosmotomidius vincus Machado & Monné, 2009

Species of beetle

Cosmotomidius vincus is a species of beetle in the family Cerambycidae. It was described by Vanessa S. Machado and Marcela L. Monné in 2009. It is known from Bolivia. It measures between 7.9 to 8.5 mm (0.31 to 0.33 in).
