= Deltaspis ivae =

Scientific classification
- Domain: Eukaryota
- Kingdom: Animalia
- Phylum: Arthropoda
- Class: Insecta
- Order: Coleoptera
- Suborder: Polyphaga
- Infraorder: Cucujiformia
- Family: Cerambycidae
- Genus: Deltaspis
- Species: D. ivae

Binomial name
- Deltaspis ivae Beierl & Barchet-Beierl, 1999

Species of beetle

Deltaspis ivae is a species of beetle in the family Cerambycidae. It was described by Beierl & Barchet-Beierl in 1999.
