= Deltaspis subopaca =

Scientific classification
- Domain: Eukaryota
- Kingdom: Animalia
- Phylum: Arthropoda
- Class: Insecta
- Order: Coleoptera
- Suborder: Polyphaga
- Infraorder: Cucujiformia
- Family: Cerambycidae
- Genus: Deltaspis
- Species: D. subopaca

Binomial name
- Deltaspis subopaca Chemsak & Linsley, 1892

Species of beetle

Deltaspis subopaca is a species of beetle in the family Cerambycidae. It was described by Chemsak & Linsley in 1892.
