= Deltaspis variabilis =

Scientific classification
- Domain: Eukaryota
- Kingdom: Animalia
- Phylum: Arthropoda
- Class: Insecta
- Order: Coleoptera
- Suborder: Polyphaga
- Infraorder: Cucujiformia
- Family: Cerambycidae
- Genus: Deltaspis
- Species: D. variabilis

Binomial name
- Deltaspis variabilis Bates, 1891

Species of beetle

Deltaspis variabilis is a species of beetle in the family Cerambycidae. It was described by Henry Walter Bates in 1891. They are 10-14mm long. They are generally red with blue-black borders on the anterior and posterior of the thorax and the sutural and basal margins of the wing case.
