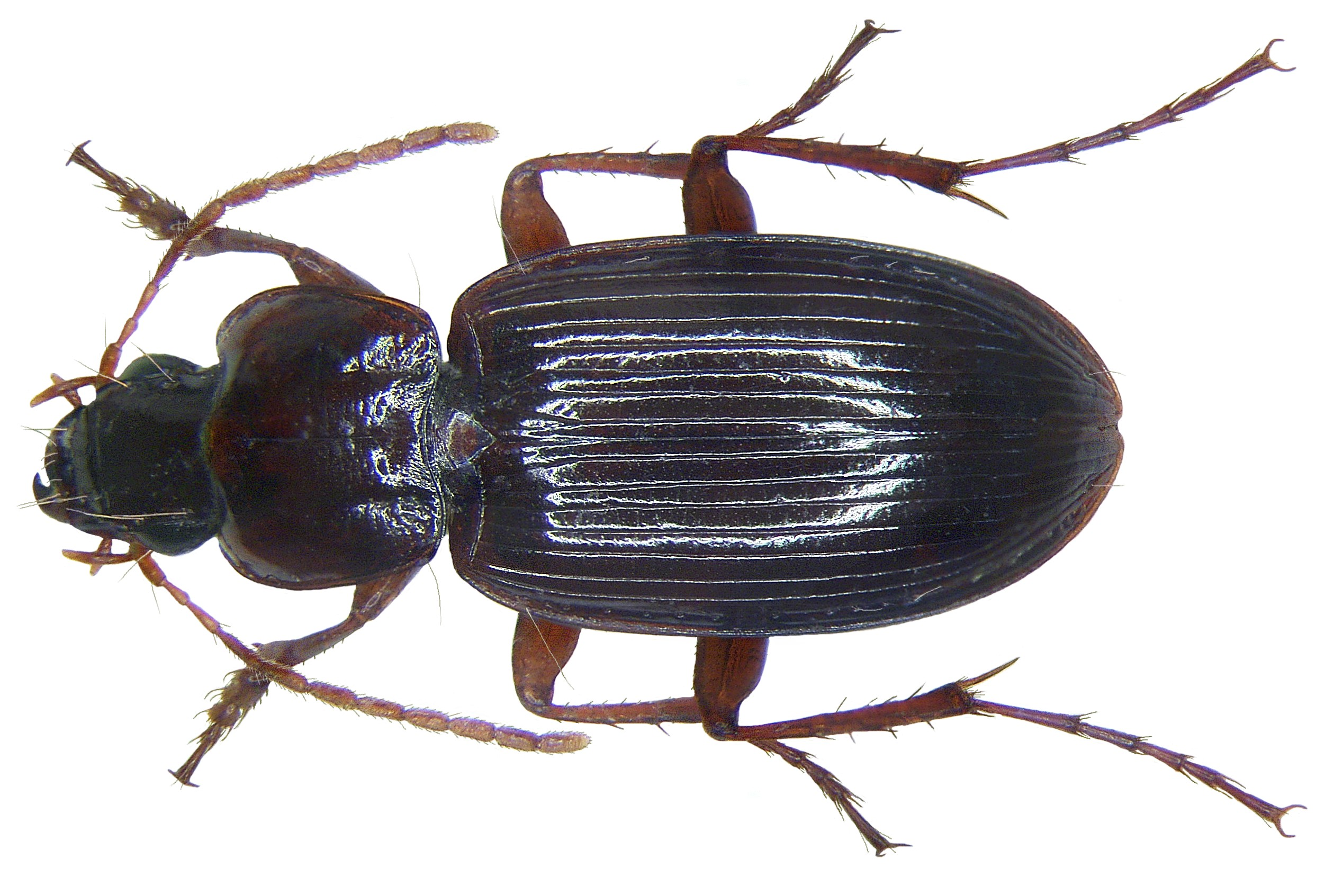

Scientific classification
- Domain: Eukaryota
- Kingdom: Animalia
- Phylum: Arthropoda
- Class: Insecta
- Order: Coleoptera
- Suborder: Adephaga
- Family: Carabidae
- Subfamily: Platyninae
- Tribe: Sphodrini
- Subtribe: Atranopsina
- Genus: Platyderus; Stephens, 1828

= Platyderus =

Genus of beetles

Platyderus is a genus of ground beetles in the family Carabidae. There are more than 100 described species in Platyderus.

== Platyderus species ==
These 109 species belong to Platyderus, a genus of ground beetles in the family Carabidae.

- Platyderus akkus Jedlicka, 1963 (Turkey)
- Platyderus algesiranus Dieck, 1870 (Spain)
- Platyderus alhamillensis Cobos, 1961 (Spain)
- Platyderus alticola Wollaston, 1864 (the Canary Islands)
- Platyderus anandi J.Schmidt, 2009 (Nepal)
- Platyderus anatolicus Jedlicka, 1963 (Turkey)
- Platyderus aragonicus Jeanne, 1985 (Spain)
- Platyderus asturiensis Jedlicka, 1958 (Spain)
- Platyderus atticus Apfelbeck, 1904 (Croatia and Greece)
- Platyderus balearicus Jeanne, 1970 (Baleares and Spain)
- Platyderus barrosi Jeanne, 1996 (Portugal)
- Platyderus barsevskisi Anichtchenko, 2010 (Spain)
- Platyderus berlovorum Anichtchenko, 2005 (Spain)
- Platyderus beseanus Jeanne, 1970 (Portugal)
- Platyderus bolivari Anichtchenko, 2011 (Spain)
- Platyderus breuili Jeannel, 1921 (Spain)
- Platyderus calathoides (Dejean, 1828) (Algeria and Morocco)
- Platyderus canaliculatus (Chaudoir, 1843) (Italy and Sicily)
- Platyderus casalei B.Gueorguiev, 2009 (Italy)
- Platyderus caucasicus Kryzhanovskij, 1968 (Georgia and Russia)
- Platyderus chodjaii Morvan, 1974 (Iran)
- Platyderus claudejeannei Machard, 2017 (Morocco)
- Platyderus coiffaiti Jeanne, 1996 (Portugal and Spain)
- Platyderus corcyreus Breit, 1914 (Greece)
- Platyderus crypticola Jeanne, 1996 (Spain)
- Platyderus cyprius Piochard de la Brûlerie, 1876 (Cyprus)
- Platyderus cyrtensis Reiche, 1872 (Algeria and Tunisia)
- Platyderus dalmatinus L.Miller in Reitter, 1881 ((former) Yugoslavia, Albania, Bosnia-Herzegovina, Croatia, and Italy)
- Platyderus davatchii Morvan, 1970 (Iran)
- Platyderus dejeani Jeanne, 1996 (Spain)
- Platyderus depressus (Audinet-Serville, 1821) (worldwide)
- Platyderus dertosensis Lagar Mascaro, 1964 (Spain)
- Platyderus elegans Bedel, 1900 (Tunisia)
- Platyderus ellipticus Bedel, 1902 (Algeria and Morocco)
- Platyderus emblema Marseul, 1871 (Spain)
- Platyderus espanoli Mateu, 1952 (Spain)
- Platyderus ferrantei Reitter, 1909 (Egypt)
- Platyderus filicornis Bedel, 1902 (Algeria)
- Platyderus formenterae Jeanne, 1988 (Baleares and Spain)
- Platyderus foveipennis (Casale, 1988) (Kyrgyzstan)
- Platyderus gallaecus Jeanne, 1970 (Spain)
- Platyderus gazureki Anichtchenko, 2011 (Spain)
- Platyderus graecus (Reiche & Saulcy, 1855) (Albania and Greece)
- Platyderus grandiceps Piochard de la Brûlerie, 1876 (Israel, Lebanon, and Syria)
- Platyderus gregarius Reiche, 1862 (Algeria, the Canary Islands, Morocco, Portugal, and Spain)
- Platyderus haberhaueri Heyden, 1889 (Tadzhikistan and Uzbekistan)
- Platyderus incertans Mateu, 1952 (Spain)
- Platyderus insignitus Bedel, 1902 (Morocco)
- Platyderus itziarae Anichtchenko, 2005 (Spain)
- Platyderus jeannei Zaballos, 1990 (Spain)
- Platyderus jedlickai Maran, 1935 (Greece)
- Platyderus juncoi Jeanne, 1996 (Spain)
- Platyderus lancerottensis Israelson, 1990 (the Canary Islands)
- Platyderus languidus (Reiche & Saulcy, 1855) (Egypt, Israel, Libya, Morocco, and Syria)
- Platyderus ledouxi Morvan, 1974 (Iran)
- Platyderus lencinai Anichtchenko, 2011 (Spain)
- Platyderus leonensis Jeanne, 1996 (Spain)
- Platyderus lombardii Straneo, 1959 (Italy and Sicily)
- Platyderus lusitanicus (Dejean, 1828) (Portugal and Spain)
- Platyderus magrinii Degiovanni, 2005 (Italy)
- Platyderus majoricus Jeanne, 1988 (Baleares and Spain)
- Platyderus marianicus Ruiz-Tapiador & Anichtchenko, 2007 (Spain)
- Platyderus mateui Anichtchenko, 2005 (Spain)
- Platyderus migelangeli Anichtchenko, 2005 (Spain)
- Platyderus minutus (Reiche & Saulcy, 1855) (Albania, Greece, and North Macedonia)
- Platyderus moncayensis Jeanne, 1985 (Spain)
- Platyderus montanellus Graells, 1851 (Spain)
- Platyderus namrun Jedlicka, 1963 (Turkey)
- Platyderus neapolitanus (Reiche, 1855) (Italy)
- Platyderus notatus (Coquerel, 1859) (Algeria and Tunisia)
- Platyderus ortunoi Arribas, 1992 (Spain)
- Platyderus otini Antoine, 1941 (Morocco)
- Platyderus paganettii B.Gueorguiev, 2009 (Italy)
- Platyderus portalegrae Vuillefroy, 1868 (Portugal)
- Platyderus preciosae Campos & Novoa, 2005 (Portugal and Spain)
- Platyderus punctiger (Reiche & Saulcy, 1855) (Israel, Syria, and Turkey)
- Platyderus pyrenaeus Tempère, 1947 (France and Spain)
- Platyderus quadricollis Chaudoir, 1866 (Spain)
- Platyderus quezeli Bruneau de Miré, 1990 (Chad)
- Platyderus reticulatus (Chaudoir, 1842) (Iran and Turkey)
- Platyderus robustoides Jeanne, 1996 (Spain)
- Platyderus robustus Mateu, 1952 (Spain)
- Platyderus rotundatus Chaudoir, 1866 (Spain)
- Platyderus rufus (Duftschmid, 1812) (worldwide)
- Platyderus saezi Vuillefroy, 1868 (Portugal and Spain)
- Platyderus sagrensis Anichtchenko, 2005 (Spain)
- Platyderus salmantinus Jeanne, 1996 (Spain)
- Platyderus schrammi Anichtchenko, 2012 (Spain)
- Platyderus schuberti Jedlicka, 1963 (Turkey)
- Platyderus sinensis Casale & Sciaky, 2003 (China)
- Platyderus skoupyi Jeanne, 1996 (Spain)
- Platyderus solissimus (Antoine, 1939) (Morocco)
- Platyderus speleus Cobos, 1961 (Spain)
- Platyderus subcrenatus Chaudoir, 1866 (Spain)
- Platyderus tadzhikistanus Kryzhanovskij, 1968 (Tadzhikistan)
- Platyderus taghizadehi Morvan, 1974 (Iran)
- Platyderus talyschensis Reitter, 1887 (Azerbaijan)
- Platyderus testaceus (Rambur, 1838) (Spain)
- Platyderus toribioi Anichtchenko, 2005 (Spain)
- Platyderus torressalai Jeanne, 1996 (Spain)
- Platyderus troglodytes L.Schaufuss, 1863 (Spain)
- Platyderus umbratus (Ménétriés, 1832) (Armenia, Azerbaijan, Georgia, and Russia)
- Platyderus valencianus Anichtchenko, 2005 (Spain)
- Platyderus varians L.Schaufuss, 1862 (Spain)
- Platyderus vignai B.Gueorguiev, 2009 (Italy)
- Platyderus vuillefroyi Dieck, 1870 (Spain)
- Platyderus weiratheri Maran, 1940 (Turkey)
- Platyderus zaballosi Anichtchenko, 2011 (Spain)
- Platyderus zagrosensis Morvan, 1975 (Iran)
