= Deltaspis rufostigma =

Scientific classification
- Domain: Eukaryota
- Kingdom: Animalia
- Phylum: Arthropoda
- Class: Insecta
- Order: Coleoptera
- Suborder: Polyphaga
- Infraorder: Cucujiformia
- Family: Cerambycidae
- Genus: Deltaspis
- Species: D. rufostigma

Binomial name
- Deltaspis rufostigma Bates, 1892

Species of beetle

Deltaspis rufostigma is a species of beetle in the family Cerambycidae. It was described by Bates in 1892.
