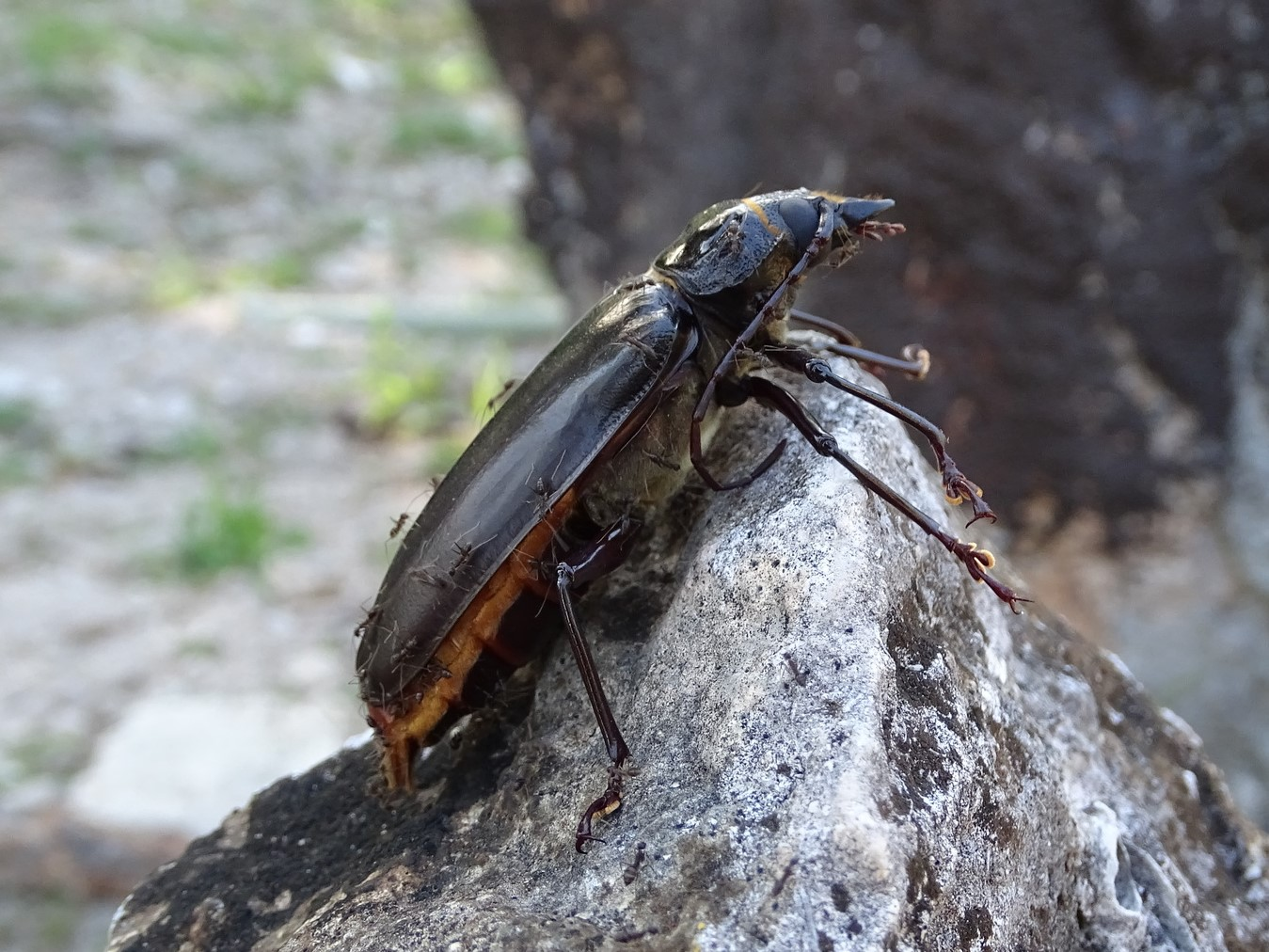

Scientific classification
- Domain: Eukaryota
- Kingdom: Animalia
- Phylum: Arthropoda
- Class: Insecta
- Order: Coleoptera
- Suborder: Polyphaga
- Infraorder: Cucujiformia
- Family: Cerambycidae
- Genus: Stenodontes
- Species: S. chevrolati

Binomial name
- Stenodontes chevrolati Gahan, 1890

Synonyms
- Stenodontes cubensis Casey, 1912; Stenodontes parallelus Casey, 1912

= Stenodontes chevrolati =

Species of beetle

Stenodontes chevrolati, or Chevrolat's tropical long-horned beetle, is a species of long-horned beetle in the family Cerambycidae. It is found in the Caribbean and North America.
