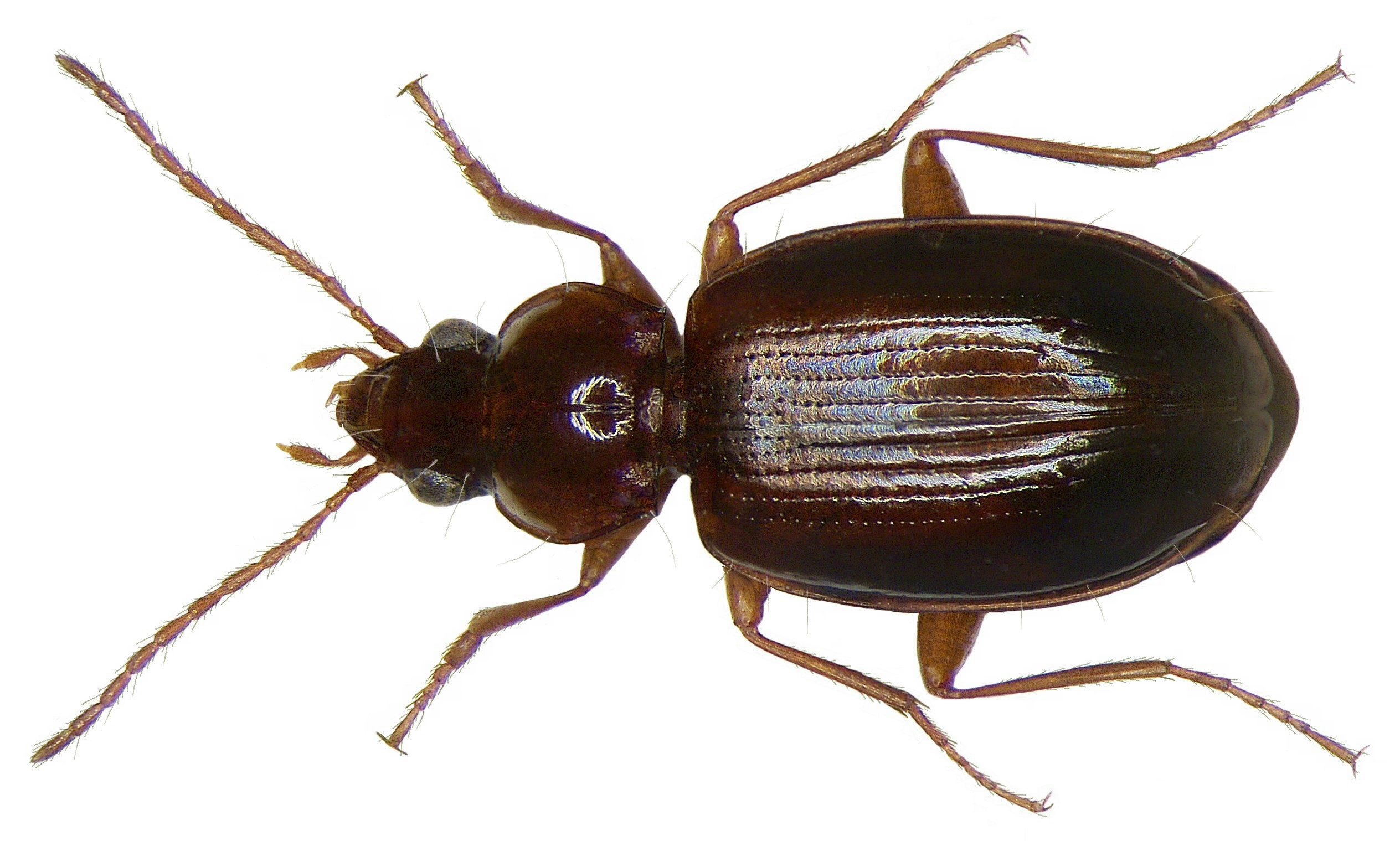
- Ocys harpaloides

Scientific classification
- Kingdom: Animalia
- Phylum: Arthropoda
- Class: Insecta
- Order: Coleoptera
- Suborder: Adephaga
- Family: Carabidae
- Subfamily: Trechinae
- Tribe: Bembidiini
- Subtribe: Bembidiina
- Genus: Ocys; Stephens, 1828

= Ocys =

Genus of beetles

Ocys is a genus of ground beetles in the family Carabidae. There are at least 30 described species in Ocys.

== Species ==
These 30 species belong to the genus Ocys:

- Ocys agostii Magrini & Petruzziello, 2018 (Italy)
- Ocys andreae (Jeannel, 1937) (Spain)
- Ocys angelae Magrini & Vigna Taglianti, 2006 (Italy)
- Ocys beatricis Magrini; Cecchi & Lo Cascio, 1998 (Italy)
- Ocys bedeli (Peyerimhoff, 1908) (Algeria)
- Ocys berbecum Magrini & Degiovanni, 2009 (Sardinia and Italy)
- Ocys crypticola Jeanne, 2000 (Spain)
- Ocys davatchii Ledoux, 1975 (Iran)
- Ocys elbursensis Morvan, 1974 (Iran)
- Ocys gubellinii Magrini & Vigna Taglianti, 2006 (Italy)
- Ocys harpaloides (Audinet-Serville, 1821) (Europe and Africa)
- Ocys hiekei Toledano & Wrase, 2016 (China)
- Ocys hoffmanni (Netolitzky, 1917) (Croatia)
- Ocys inguscioi Magrini & Vanni, 1992 (Italy)
- Ocys ledouxi Morvan, 1974 (Iran)
- Ocys monzinii Magrini & Vigna Taglianti, 2006 (Italy)
- Ocys pecoudi Colas, 1957 (Greece)
- Ocys pennisii Magrini & Vanni, 1989 (Italy)
- Ocys peyerimhoffi (Paulian & Villiers, 1939) (Morocco)
- Ocys phoceus Giachino & Vailati, 2012 (Greece)
- Ocys pravei (Lutshnik, 1926) (Georgia, Armenia, and Azerbaijan)
- Ocys pseudopaphius Reitter, 1902 (Ukraine)
- Ocys quinquestriatus (Gyllenhal, 1810) (Europe and temperate Asia)
- Ocys reticulatus (Netolitzky, 1917) (worldwide)
- Ocys reuteri Toledano & Wrase, 2016 (Iraq)
- Ocys rotundipennis C.Huber & Marggi, 2001 (Greece)
- Ocys soleymanensis Morvan, 1974 (Iran)
- Ocys tachysoides (Antoine, 1933) (Europe and Africa)
- Ocys tassii Vigna Taglianti, 1995 (Italy)
- Ocys trechoides Reitter, 1895 (Armenia)
