= Deltaspis =

Scientific classification
- Domain: Eukaryota
- Kingdom: Animalia
- Phylum: Arthropoda
- Class: Insecta
- Order: Coleoptera
- Suborder: Polyphaga
- Infraorder: Cucujiformia
- Family: Cerambycidae
- Subfamily: Cerambycinae
- Tribe: Trachyderini
- Genus: Deltaspis; Audinet-Serville, 1834

Genus of beetles

Deltaspis is a genus of longhorn beetle in the subfamily Cerambycinae, containing the following species:

- Deltaspis alutacea Bates, 1885
- Deltaspis auromarginata Audinet-Serville, 1834
- Deltaspis cruentus (LeConte, 1862)
- Deltaspis cyanipes Bates, 1885
- Deltaspis disparilis Bates, 1891
- Deltaspis ivae Beierl & Barchet-Beierl, 1999
- Deltaspis marginella Bates, 1891
- Deltaspis moesta Bates, 1885
- Deltaspis nigripennis Bates, 1880
- Deltaspis rubens Bates, 1885
- Deltaspis rubriventris Bates, 1880
- Deltaspis rufostigma Bates, 1892
- Deltaspis subopaca Chemsak & Linsley, 1982
- Deltaspis thoracica White, 1853
- Deltaspis tumacacorii (Knull, 1944)
- Deltaspis variabilis Bates, 1891
