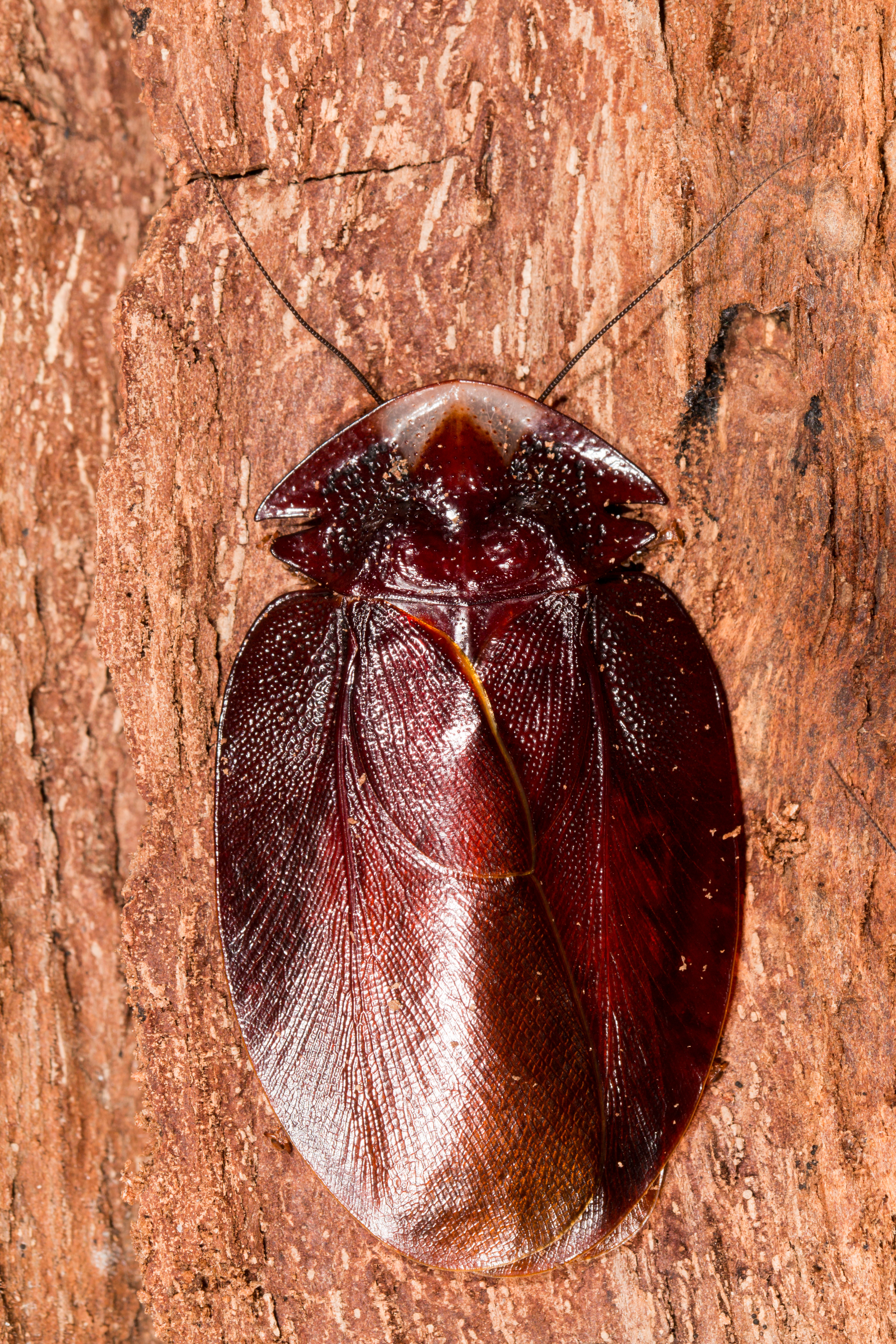
- Schizopilia fissicollis

Scientific classification
- Kingdom: Animalia
- Phylum: Arthropoda
- Clade: Pancrustacea
- Class: Insecta
- Order: Blattodea
- Family: Blaberidae
- Subfamily: Zetoborinae
- Genus: Schizopilia; Saussure, 1864

= Schizopilia =

Genus of cockroaches

Schizopilia is a genus of South American cockroaches.

== Species ==
This genus contains the following species:

- Schizopilia fissicollis (Saussure 1864)
- Schizopilia neblinensis (Lindemann, 1971)
