= Suites à Buffon =

French 19th-century scientific publication

Les Suites à Buffon is a French 19th-century scientific publication.

Les Suites à Buffon carries the complete title Suites à Buffon formant avec les œuvres de cet auteur un cours complet d'histoire naturelle embrassant les trois règnes de la nature, confié aux plus célèbres naturalistes et habiles écrivains (Sequels to Buffon Constituting a Complete Course of Natural History Encompassing the Three Reigns of Nature, Entrusted to the Most Famous Naturalists and to Skillful Writers). The three reigns or kingdoms are Botany, Zoology and Geology.

This work constitutes a vast realization in 89 volumes edited and published by the Parisian editor Nicolas Roret. Published between 1834 and 1890, it appears in many forms and is often extracted, sometimes under the titles Nouvelles Suites à Buffon, Suites à Buffon, and Nouvelles Suites à Buffon.

An example of a Suites à Buffon title is Louis Augustin Guillaume Bosc, Histoire Naturelle des Coquilles, contenant leur description, les moeurs des animaux qui les habitant et leurs usages in 5 vols. 2nd ed. Paris, Verdière, 1824. Several new species of shells are described in this rather rare work which included a long "table alphabétique de toutes les espèces mentionnées dans ces ouvrages avec les synonymes de Lamarck". It is not clear from the title that this is part of Suites à Buffon, but it is, though not published by Roret and of a specialised nature.

Sometimes Suites de Buffon

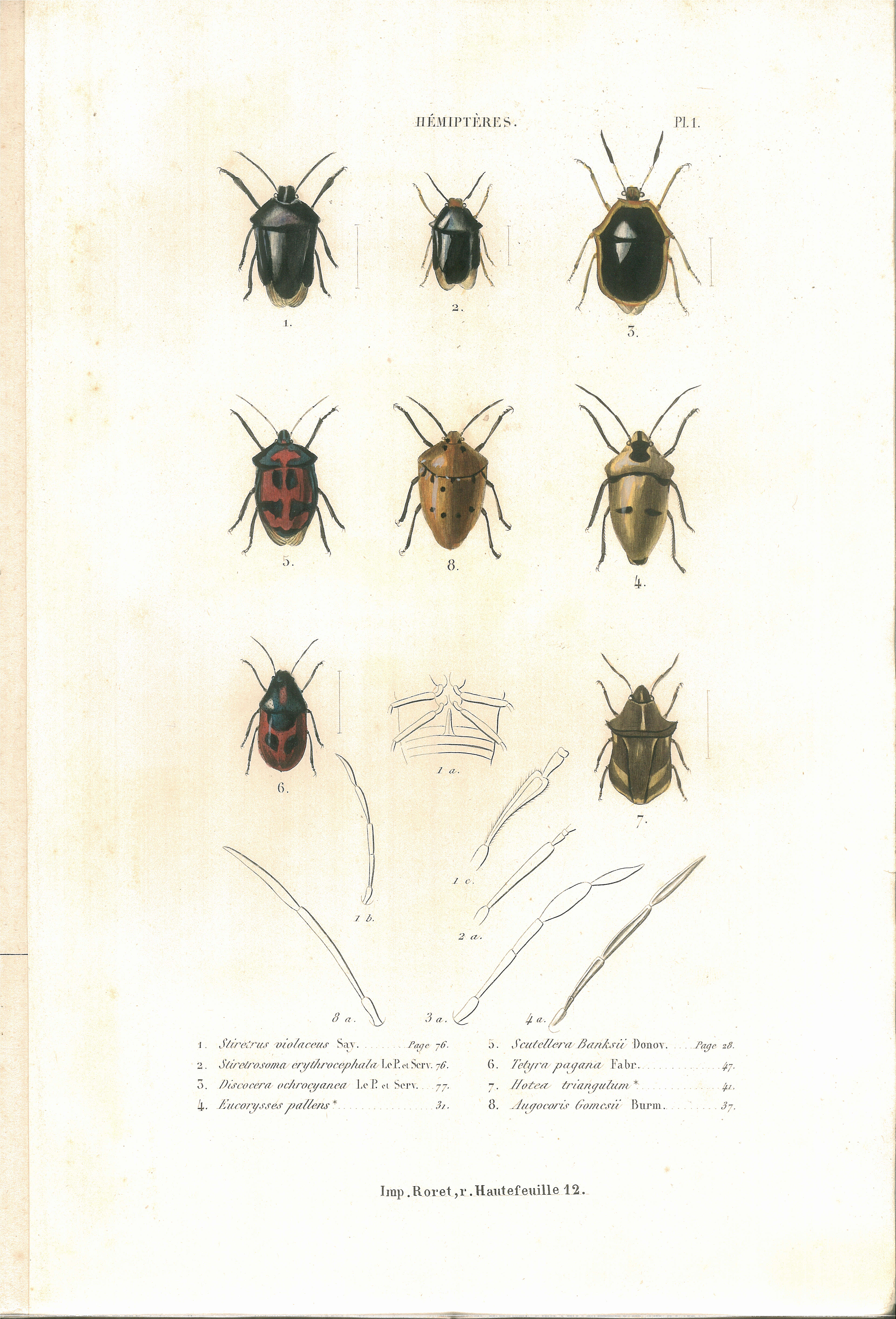
Plate 1 from: C.J.-B. Amyot and J. G. Audinet-Serville (1843). Histoire naturelle des insectes. Hémiptères. Paris, Librairie encyclopédique de Roret.

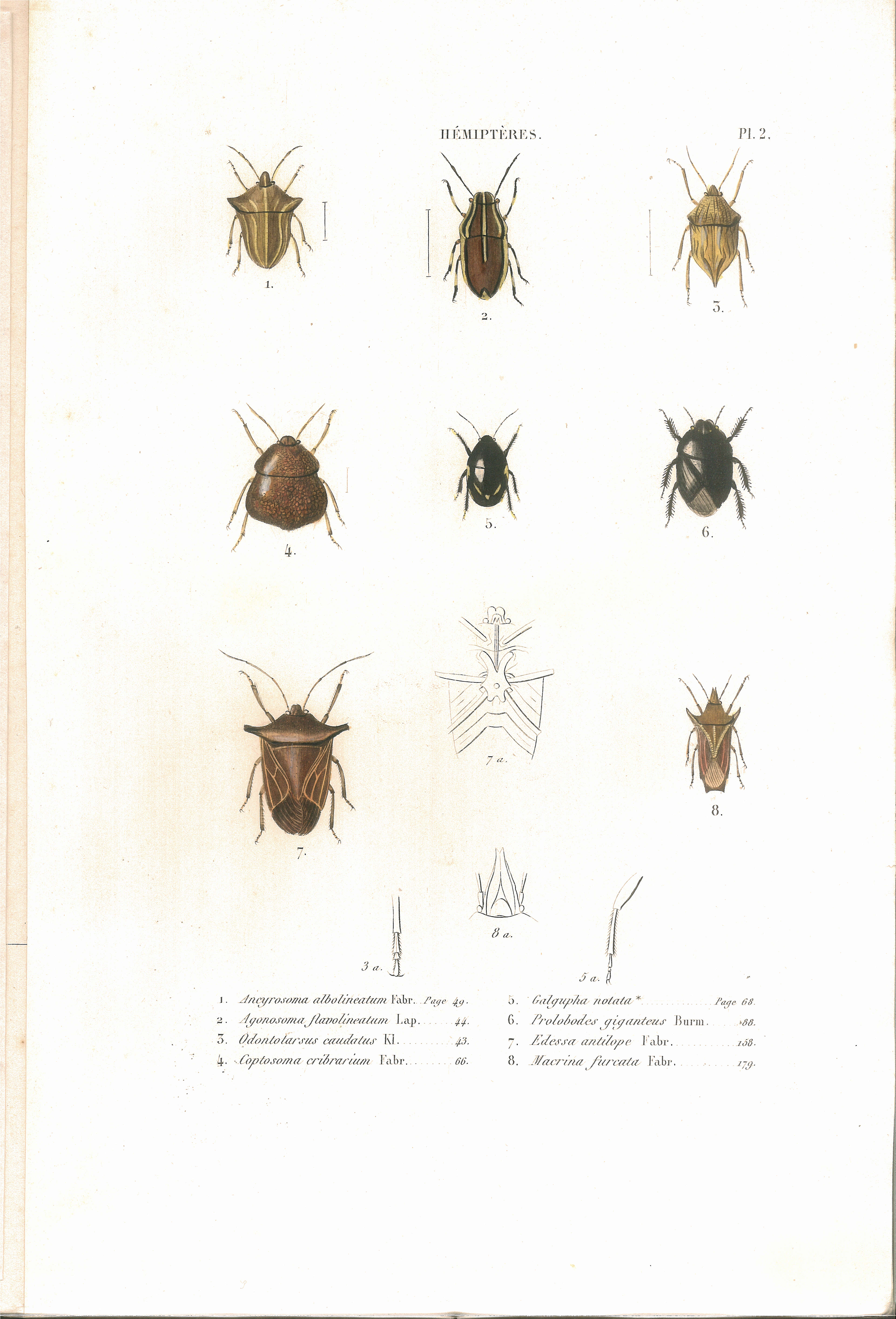
Plate 2 from: C.J.-B. Amyot and J. G. Audinet-Serville (1843). Histoire naturelle des insectes. Hémiptères. Paris, Librairie encyclopédique de Roret.

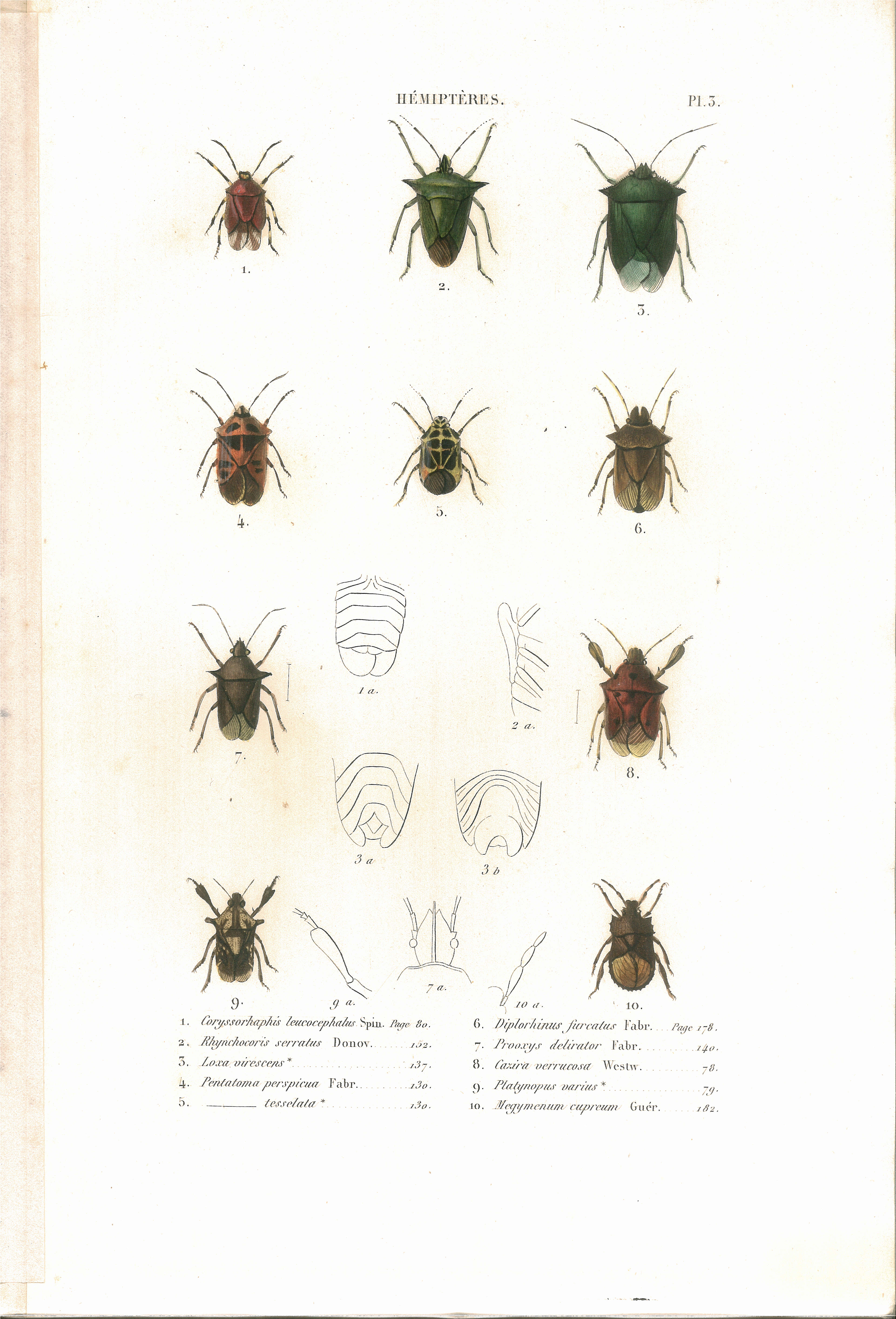
Plate 3 from: C.J.-B. Amyot and J. G. Audinet-Serville (1843). Histoire naturelle des insectes. Hémiptères. Paris, Librairie encyclopédique de Roret.

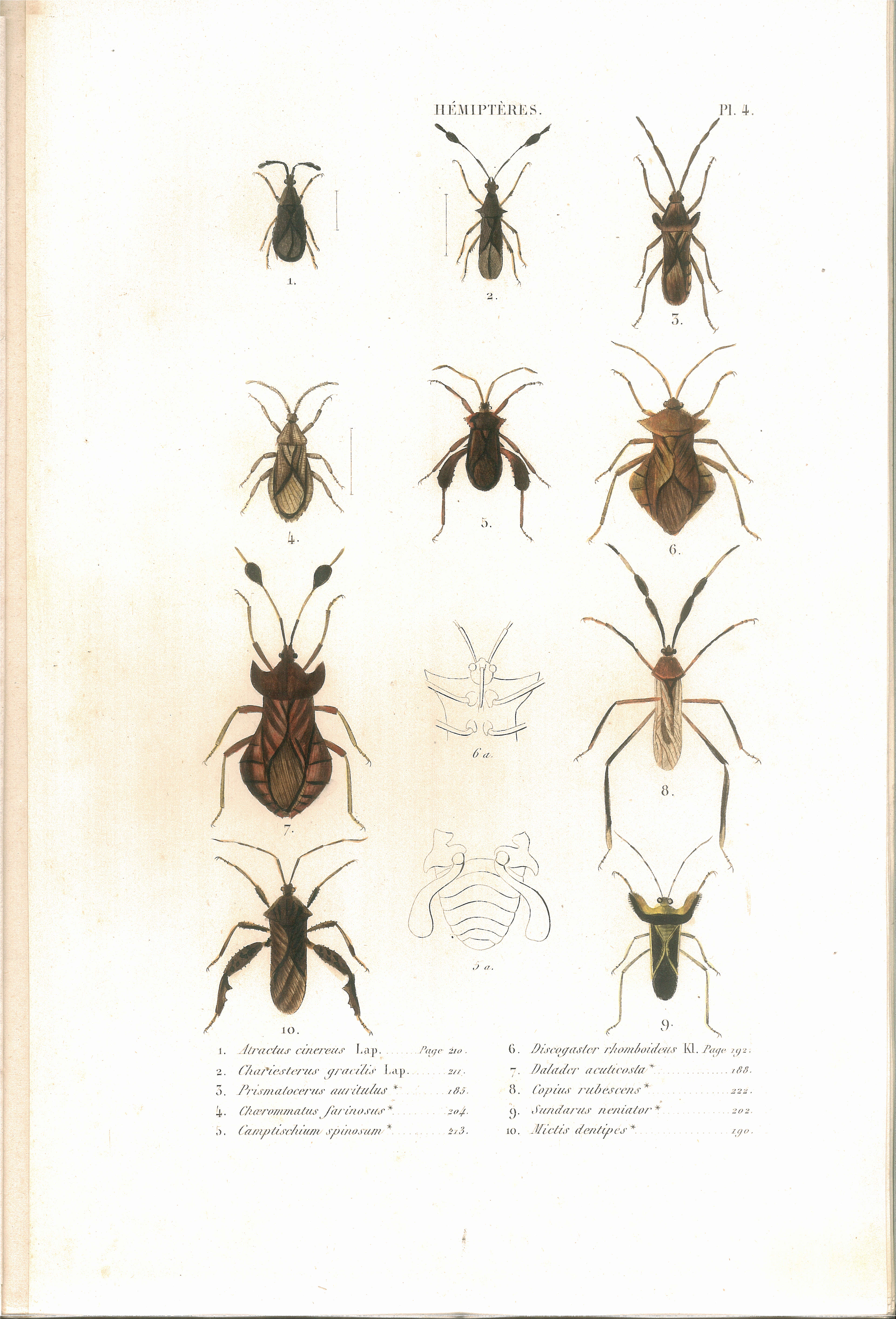
Plate 4 from: C.J.-B. Amyot and J. G. Audinet-Serville (1843). Histoire naturelle des insectes. Hémiptères. Paris, Librairie encyclopédique de Roret.

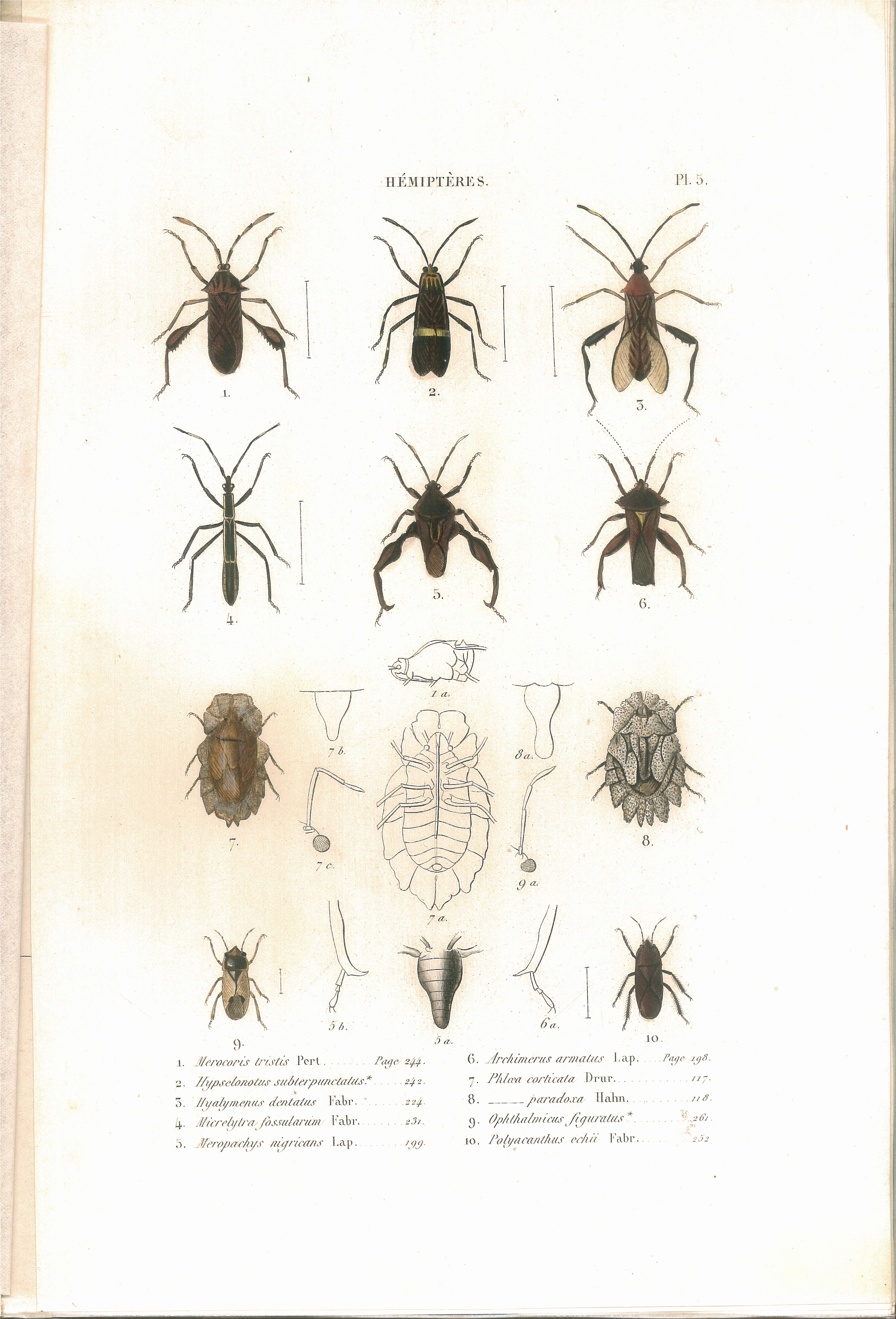
Plate 5 from: C.J.-B. Amyot and J. G. Audinet-Serville (1843). Histoire naturelle des insectes. Hémiptères. Paris, Librairie encyclopédique de Roret.

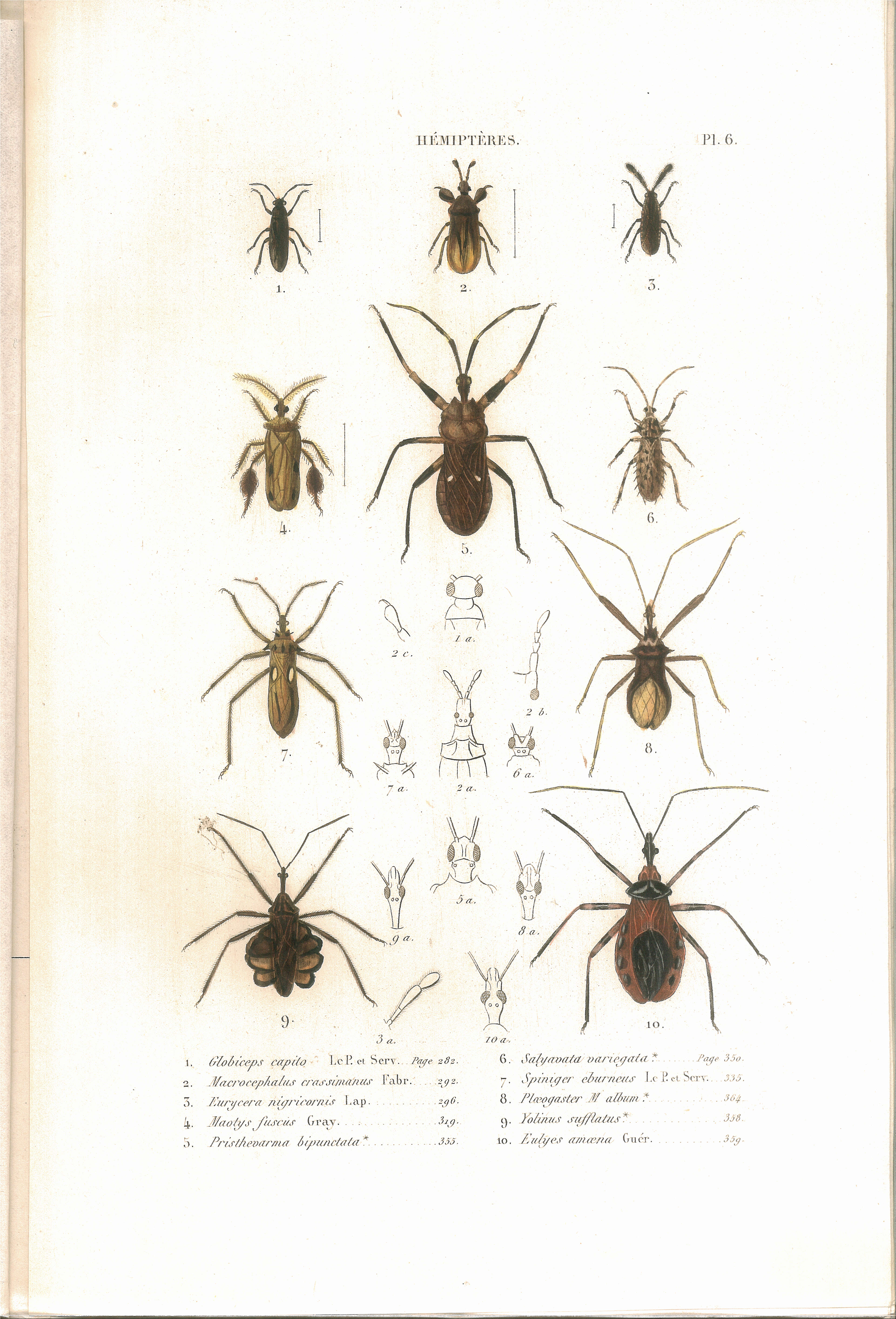
Plate 6 from: C.J.-B. Amyot and J. G. Audinet-Serville (1843). Histoire naturelle des insectes. Hémiptères. Paris, Librairie encyclopédique de Roret.

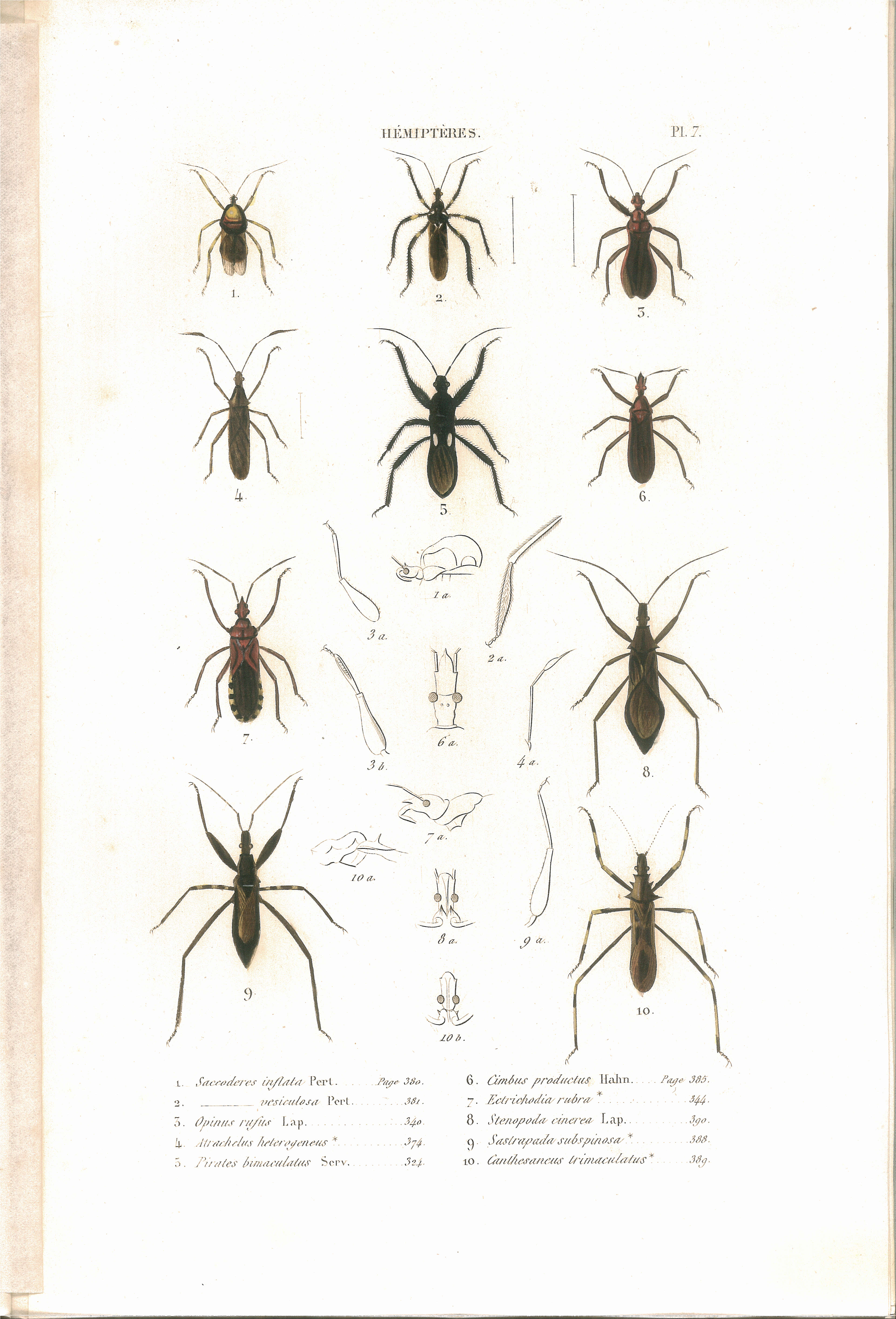
Plate 7 from: C.J.-B. Amyot and J. G. Audinet-Serville (1843). Histoire naturelle des insectes. Hémiptères. Paris, Librairie encyclopédique de Roret.

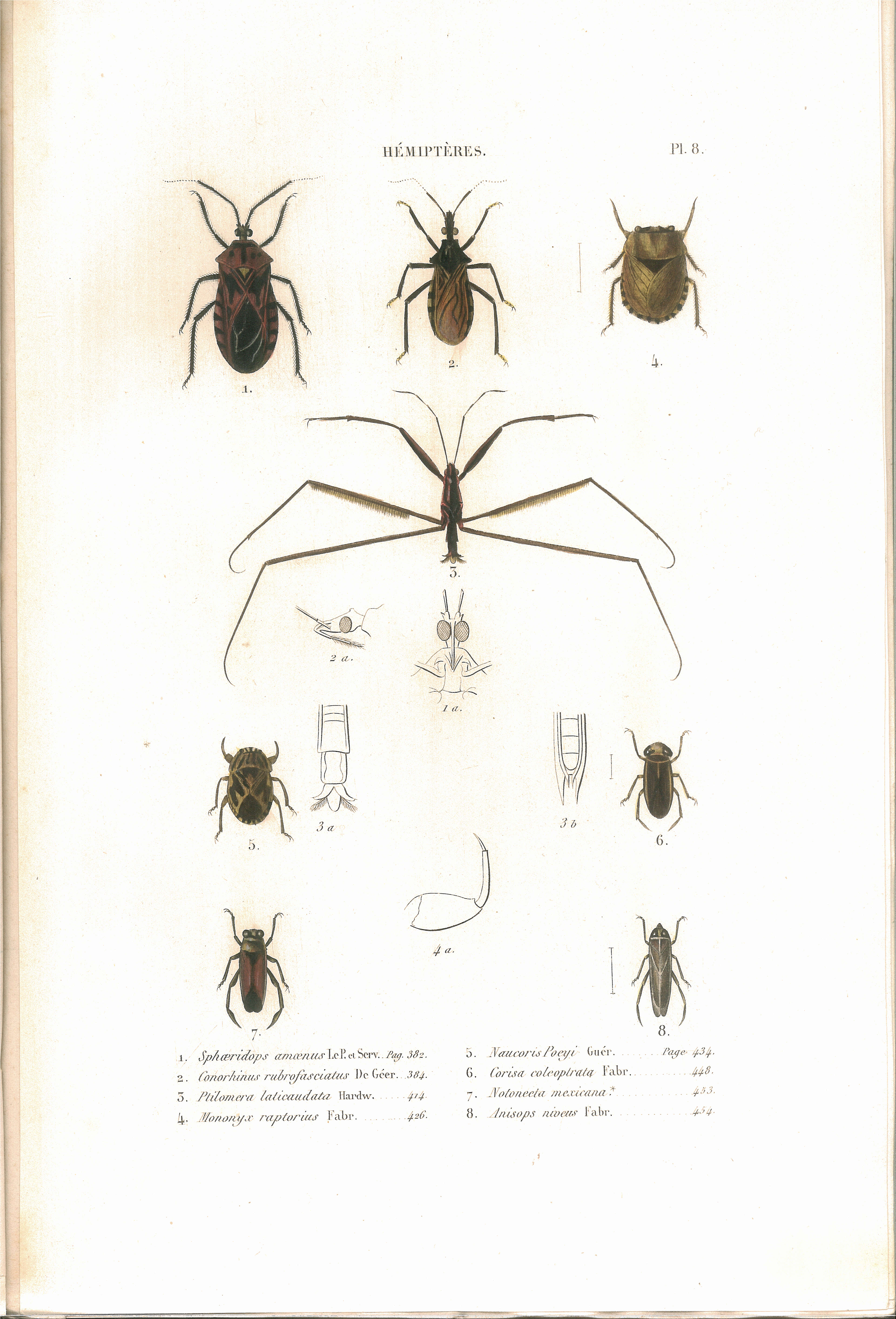
Plate 8 from: C.J.-B. Amyot and J. G. Audinet-Serville (1843). Histoire naturelle des insectes. Hémiptères. Paris, Librairie encyclopédique de Roret.

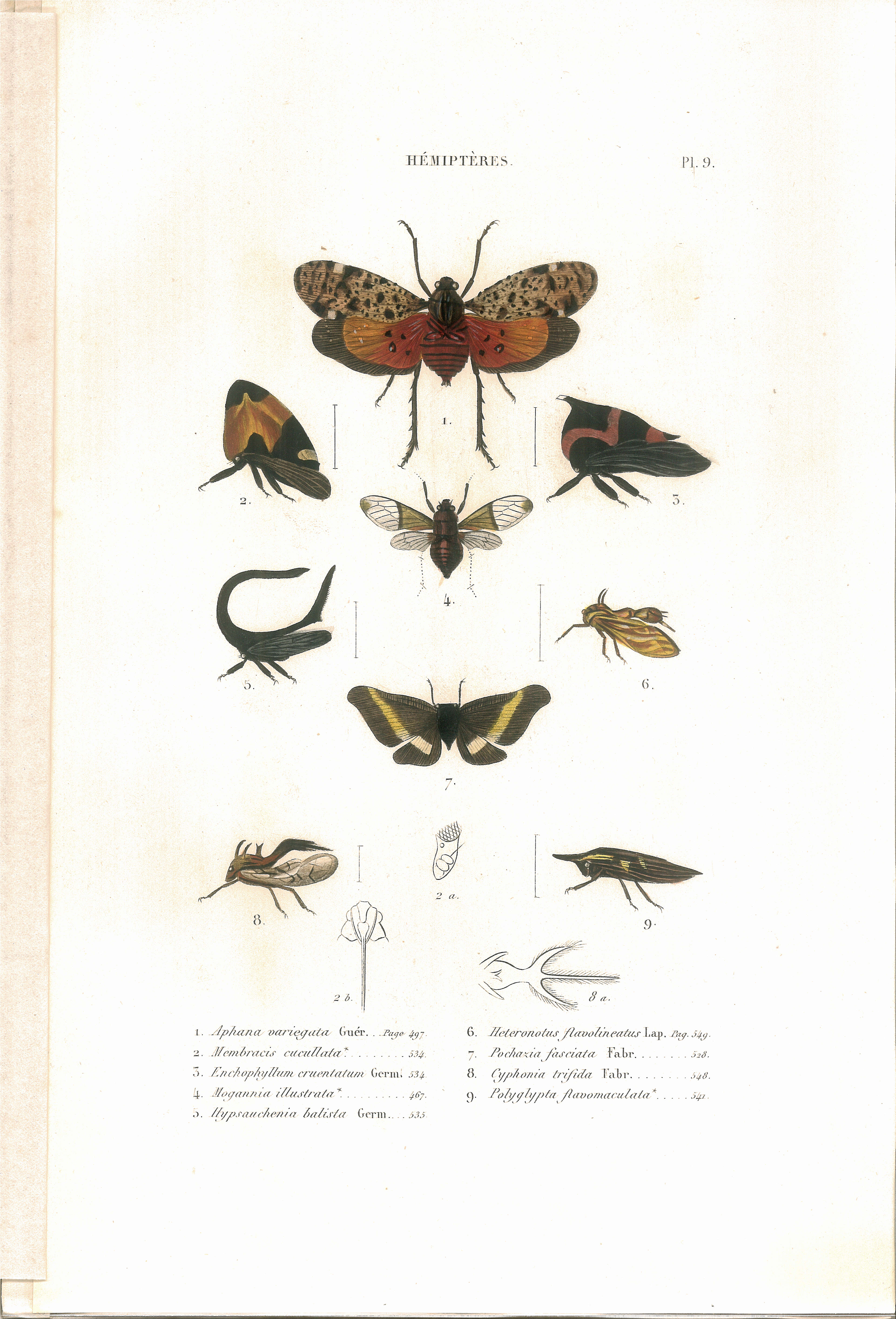
Plate 9 from: C.J.-B. Amyot and J. G. Audinet-Serville (1843). Histoire naturelle des insectes. Hémiptères. Paris, Librairie encyclopédique de Roret.

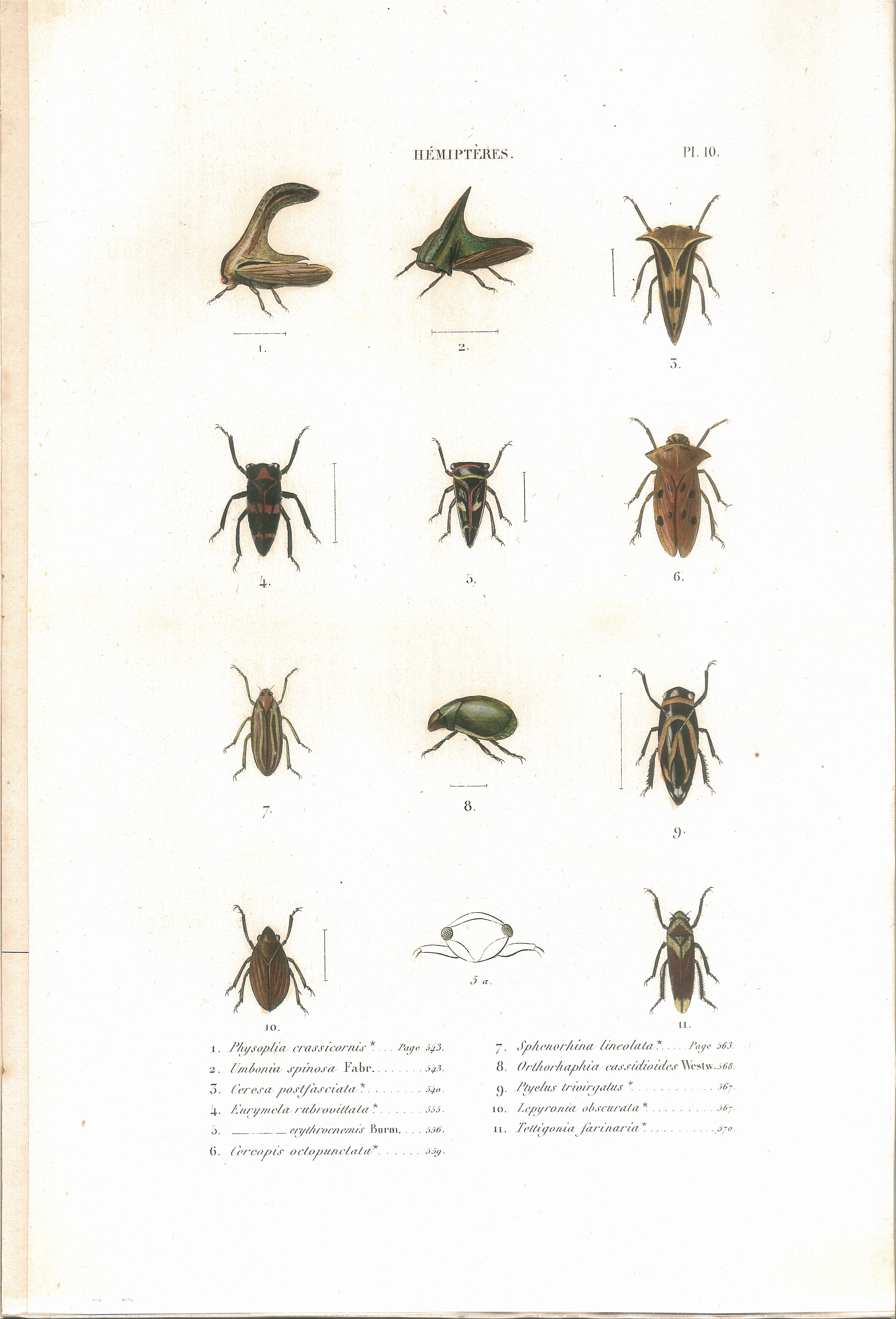
Plate 10 from: C.J.-B. Amyot and J. G. Audinet-Serville (1843). Histoire naturelle des insectes. Hémiptères. Paris, Librairie encyclopédique de Roret.

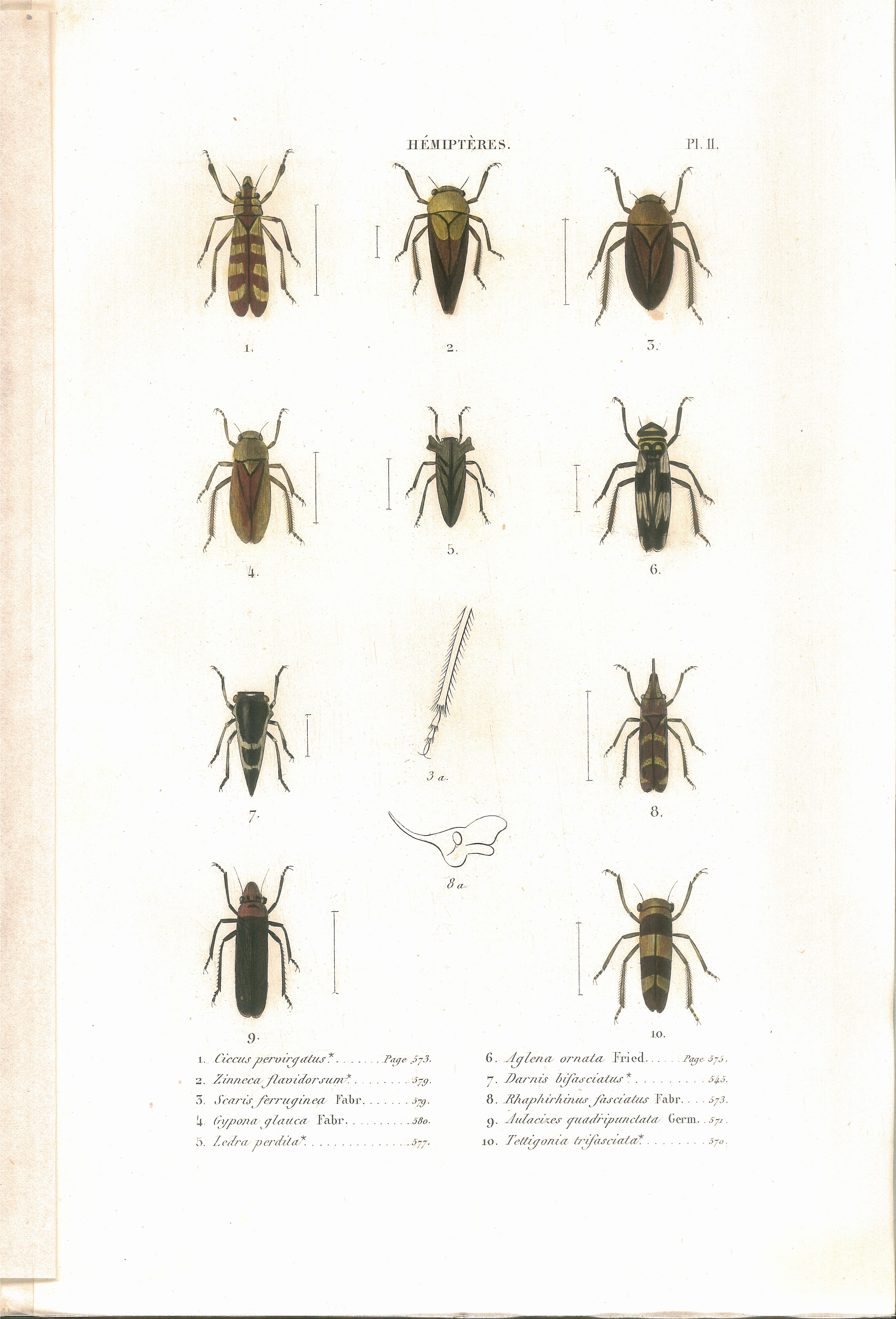
Plate 11 from: C.J.-B. Amyot and J. G. Audinet-Serville (1843). Histoire naturelle des insectes. Hémiptères. Paris, Librairie encyclopédique de Roret.

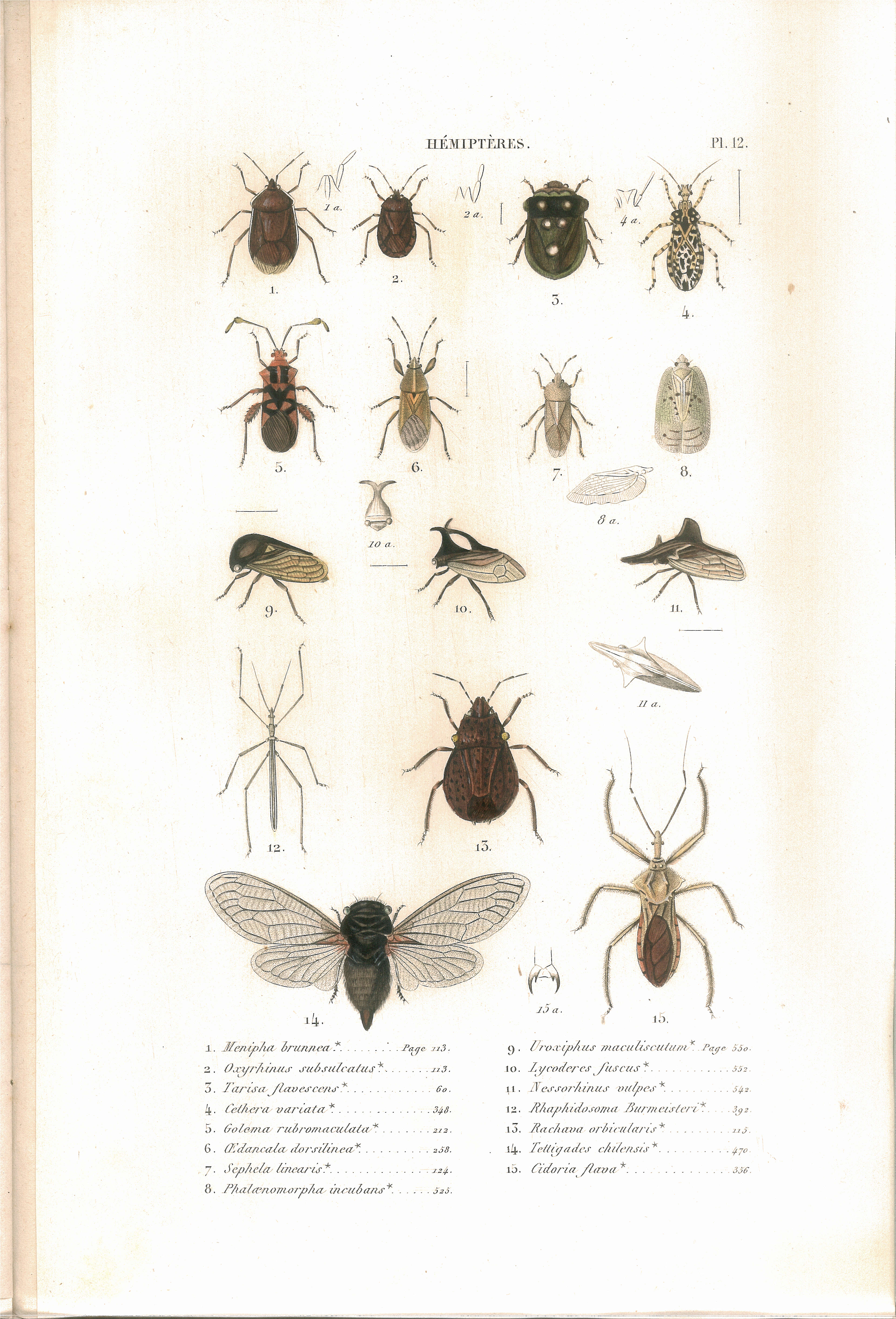
Plate 12 from: C.J.-B. Amyot and J. G. Audinet-Serville (1843). Histoire naturelle des insectes. Hémiptères. Paris, Librairie encyclopédique de Roret.

== See also ==
- Georges-Louis Leclerc, Comte de Buffon
