= Jean Guillaume Audinet-Serville =

French entomologist (1775–1858)

Jean Guillame Audinet-Serville
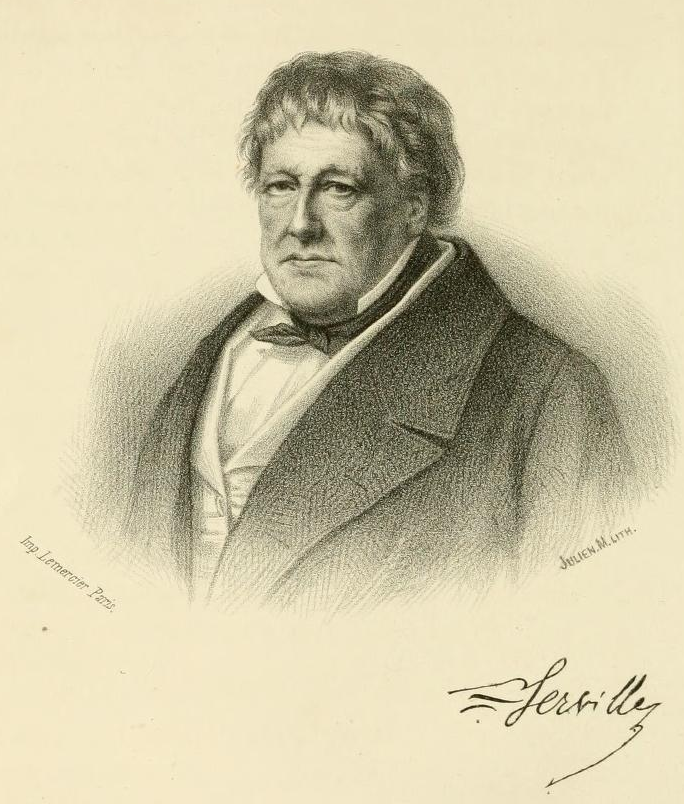
- Born: 11 November 1775; Paris
- Died: 27 March 1858 (aged 82); La Ferté-sous-Jouarre
- Scientific career
- Fields: Entomology

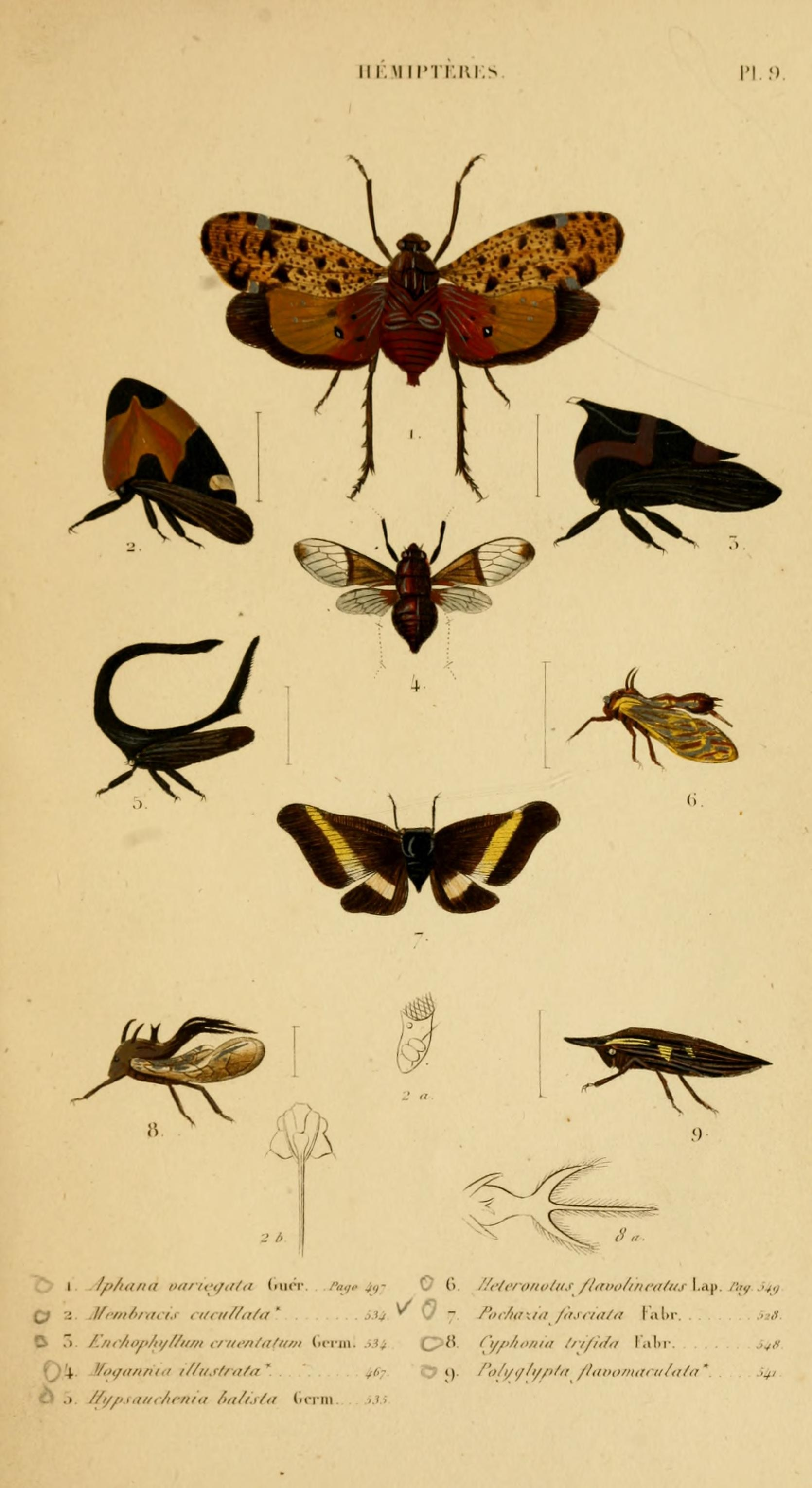
Suites à Buffon Histoire Naturelle des Insectes.Hémiptères. Plate 9

Jean Guillaume Audinet-Serville (French pronunciation: [ʒɑ̃ ɡijom odinɛ sɛʁvil]; his name, before the Revolution, included a particle: Audinet de Serville) was a French entomologist, born on 11 November 1775 in Paris. He died on 27 March 1858 in La Ferté-sous-Jouarre.

== Life and career ==
He was introduced to entomology by Madame de Grostête-Tigny who was fascinated, like her husband, by chemistry and insects. Through her, Audinet-Serville met Pierre André Latreille (1762–1833). Latreille worked with him on the Dictionnaire des Insectes de l’Encyclopédie méthodique ("The Methodical Encyclopedia Dictionary of Insects"). Then, working with Guillaume-Antoine Olivier (1756–1814), he finished the book Faune française ("French Fauna") in 1830.

Audinet-Serville is particularly known for his work on the Orthoptera. He published, Revue méthodique de l’ordre des Orthoptères ("Methodical Review of the Order of Orthoptera") which appeared in Annales des sciences naturelles in 1831. Then, in 1839, in the series of works entitled les Suites à Buffon, a volume on the same order, Histoire naturelle des Insectes Orthoptères ("Natural History of Orthoptera Insects").

He was a friend of Charles Jean-Baptiste Amyot and wrote with him Histoire naturelle des insectes Hemipteres ("Natural History of Hemiptera Insects"). Paris, Libraire Encyclopedique de Roret: 1–675 (1843). and with Amédée Louis Michel le Peletier, comte de Saint-Fargeau he contributed a treatise on Hemiptera to Guillaume-Antoine Olivier's natural history, Entomologie, ou histoire naturelle des Crustacés, des Arachnides et des Insectes (Encyclopédie Méthodique)
