= List of insects in the Red Data Book of Russia =

This is a list of insects in the Red Data Book of Russia. The Red Data Book of Russia is a state document established for documenting rare and endangered species of animals, plants and fungi, as well as some local subspecies (such as the Ladoga seal) that exist within the territory of the Russian Federation and its continental shelf and marine economic zone.

== Odonata ==
Anax imperator (declining)

== Orthoptera ==
Bradyporus multituberculatus (endangered)
Saga pedo (declining)

== Coleoptera ==
Carabus caucasicus (declining)
Carabus gebleri (endangered)
Carabus avinovi (declining)
Carabus lopatini (declining)
Carabus constricticollis (declining)
Carabus rugipennis (declining)
Carabus jankowskii (declining)
Carabus constantinovi (declining)
Carabus riedeli (declining)
Carabus hungaricus (declining)
Carabus menetriesi (declining)
Carabus miroshnikovi (declining)
Calosoma maximowiczi (declining)
Calosoma sycophanta (declining)
Calosoma reticulatus (endangered)
Alaus parreyssi (endangered)
Ceruchus lignarius (declining)
Lucanus cervus (declining)
Osmoderma eremita (declining)
Osmoderma barnabita (declining)
Osmoderma opicum (declining)
Netocia aeruginosa (declining)
Netocia speciosa (declining)
Aphodius bimaculatus (declining)
Asmocia ripteculatus (declining)
Callipogon relictus (declining)
Callipogon serricollis (declining)
Callipogon caucasicola (declining)
Callipogon nodulosus (declining)
Rosalia alpina (declining)
Rosalia coelestis (declining)
Chrysolina urjanchaica (declining)
Brachycerus sinuatus (endangered)
Otiorhynchus rugosus (endangered)
Omias verruca (endangered)
Euidosomus acuminatus (declining)
Stephanocleonus tetragrammus (declining)

== Hymenoptera ==
Pleroneura dahli (declining)
Megaxyela gigantea (declining)
Orussus abietinus (declining)
Characopygus modestus (declining)
Acantholyda flaviceps (declining)
Caenolyda reticulata (declining)
Pseudoclavellaria semenovi (declining)
Orientabia egregia (declining)
Zaraea gussakovskii (declining)
Abia semenoviana (declining)
Apterogyna volgensis (declining)
Parnopes grandior (declining)
Xylocopa valga (declining)
Bombus paradoxus (declining)
Bombus anachoreta (declining)
Bombus unicus (declining)
Bombus proteus (declining)
Bombus armeniacus (declining)
Bombus czerskii (declining)
Bombus fragrans (declining)
Bombus mastrucatus (declining)
Apis cerana (endangered)
Liometopum orientale (declining)

== Lepidoptera ==
Camptoloma interiorata (endangered)
Pallarctia mongolica (endangered)
Catocala kotshubeji (endangered)
Catocala moltrecht (endangered)
Catocala nagioides (declining)
Arcte coerula (endangered)
Mimeusemia persimilis (endangered)
Asteropetes noctuina (endangered)
Bombyx mandarina (endangered)
Numenes disparilis (endangered)
Numenes furva (endangered)
Rosama ornata (endangered)
Sphecodina caudata (endangered)
Clanis undulosa (endangered)
Bibasis aquilina (declining)
Coreana raphaelis (declining)
Chaetoprocta superans (endangered)
Chaetoprocta pacifica (endangered)
Neolycaena davidi (endangered)
Neolycaena rhymnus (declining)
Neolycaena filipjevi (endangered)
Neolycaena oreas (endangered)
Neolycaena argal (endangered)
Hamearis lucina (declining)
Argynnis zenobia (declining)
Seokia eximia (declining)
Erebia kindermanni (endangered)
Oeneis elwesi (endangered)
Parnassius mnemosyne (declining)
Parnassius felderi (endangered)
Parnassius apollo (declining)
Sericinus montela (declining)
Atrophaneura alcinous (endangered)

== Sources ==
- Красная книга Российской Федерации. Т. 1: Животные. Москва: Астрель, 2001. ISBN 5-17-004878-5
