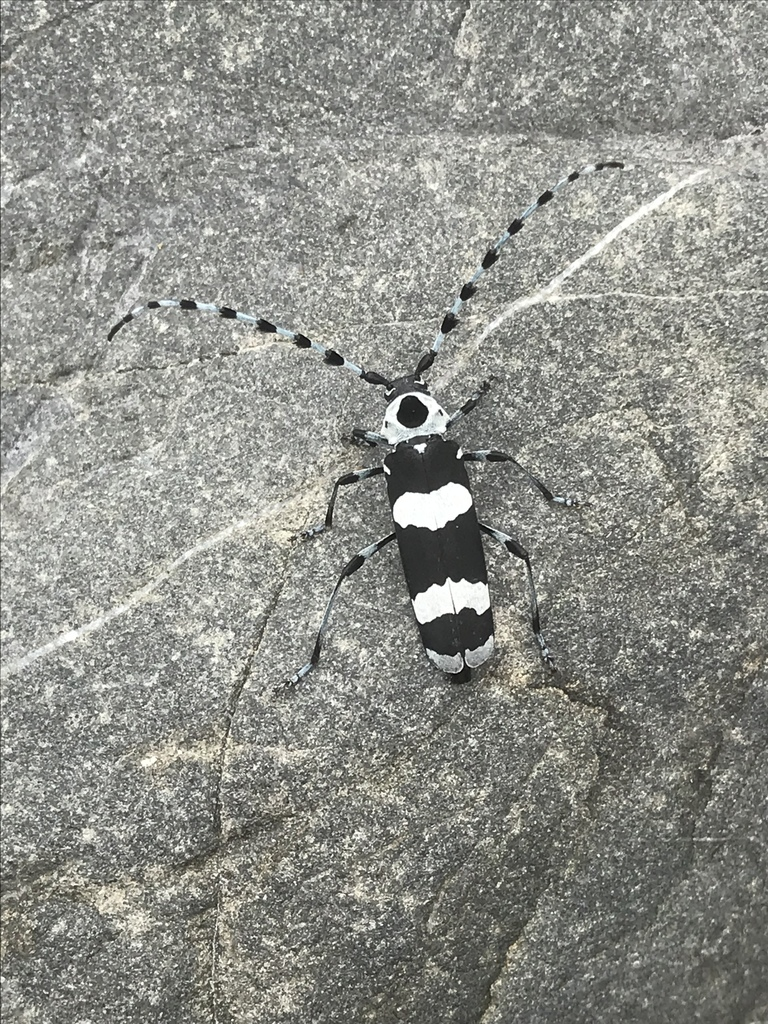
- Banded Alder Borer on native stone observed near Klamath, California, USA.

Scientific classification
- Kingdom: Animalia
- Phylum: Arthropoda
- Clade: Pancrustacea
- Class: Insecta
- Order: Coleoptera
- Suborder: Polyphaga
- Infraorder: Cucujiformia
- Family: Cerambycidae
- Genus: Rosalia
- Species: R. funebris

Binomial name
- Rosalia funebris (Motschulsky, 1845)

= Rosalia funebris =

Species of beetle

The Banded Alder Borer (Rosalia funebris) is a member of the very diverse family of longhorn beetles.

== Appearance ==
Like many other species in the family Cerambycidae, R. funebris has strikingly colored wing covers (elytra). The elytra are dark with three white bands. The thorax (pronotum) is white with a large black spot. The alder borer's antennae are banded white and black. The male's antennae are longer than the body; the female's are shorter. Long and narrow, the body of R. funebris may grow to be 38 millimetres (1.5 in).

== Distribution ==
They are found in western North America, from Alaska through California, and in New Mexico. The banded alder borer may be found in the spring and summer on the bark of alder trees.

The exact reason is unknown, but R. funebris is drawn to recently painted buildings and may be found, in multitudes, resting on the paint.

== Larvae ==
The adult wood-boring beetles lay their eggs in a crevice in the bark of hardwood trees, such as Oregon ash, New Mexico willow, and California laurel/Oregon myrtle. From there the larvae bore into the wood. Unlike the oval (in cross-section) tunnels of the Buprestidae larva, larval Cerambycidae tunnels are circular (in cross-section) and will generally go straight for short distances between turns.

== Food ==
Most mature Cerambycidae feed on flowers. The larvae consume wood. Rosalia funebris generally lays its eggs on downed trees rather than living trees, so it is not considered a significant pest.

== Sound ==
When handled or threatened R. funebris makes an audible noise similar to that of a squeaky running shoe, or a hissing sound much like air being let out of a bike tire.

== Other Rosalia species ==
- Rosalia alpina (Linnaeus, 1758) – Rosalia longicorn
- Rosalia batesi Harold, 1877
- Rosalia coelestis Semenov, 1911
- Rosalia houlberti Vuillet, 1911
- Rosalia lameerei Brogn, 1890
