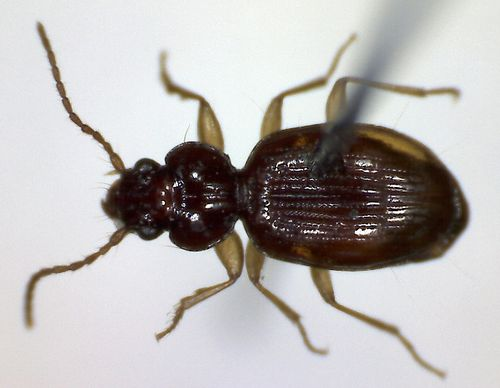
- Epaphius secalis

Scientific classification
- Kingdom: Animalia
- Phylum: Arthropoda
- Class: Insecta
- Order: Coleoptera
- Suborder: Adephaga
- Family: Carabidae
- Subtribe: Trechina
- Genus: Epaphius; Leach, 1819

Type species
- Carabus secalis Paykull, 1790

= Epaphius =

Genus of beetles

Epaphius is a genus of beetles belonging to the family Carabidae.

The species of this genus are found in Europe and eat Asia (Russia, China, Mongolia, Korea and Japan).

Species:

- Epaphius acco (Ueno, 1991)
- Epaphius alpicola (Sturm, 1825)
- Epaphius amplicollis (Fairmaire, 1859)
- Epaphius apicalis (Motschulsky, 1865)
- Epaphius arsenjevi Jeannel, 1962
- Epaphius castificus Moravec & Wrase, 1998
- Epaphius chalybeus (Dejean, 1831)
- Epaphius chinensis (Jeannel, 1920)
- Epaphius coloradensis (Schaeffer, 1915)
- Epaphius crassiscapus (Lindroth, 1955)
- Epaphius dorsistriatus (Morawitz, 1862)
- Epaphius ephippiatus (Bates, 1873)
- Epaphius hashimotoi (Ueno, 1961)
- Epaphius himalayanus (Ueno, 1972)
- Epaphius ikutanii (Ueno, 1961)
- Epaphius latibuli (Jeannel, 1948)
- Epaphius limacodes (Dejean, 1831)
- Epaphius matsumotoi (Ueno, 1984)
- Epaphius nishikawai (Ueno, 1991)
- Epaphius ochreatus (Dejean, 1927)
- Epaphius oregonensis (Hatch, 1951)
- Epaphius orientosinicus Deuve, 1992
- Epaphius ovatus (Putzeys, 1845)
- Epaphius ozegaharanus (Ueno, 1954)
- Epaphius pinkeri (Ganglbauer, 1892)
- Epaphius pirica (Ueno, 1992)
- Epaphius plutenkoi (Lafer, 1989)
- Epaphius qinlingensis Moravec & Wrase, 1998
- Epaphius rivularis (Gyllenhal, 1810)
- Epaphius rubens (Fabricius, 1792)
- Epaphius rudolphi (Ganglbauer, 1891)
- Epaphius secalis (Paykull, 1790)
- Epaphius shennongjianus Deuve, 2002
- Epaphius shushensis (Belousov & Kabak, 1994)
- Epaphius stheno Deuve, 2011
- Epaphius sugai (Ueno, 1984)
- Epaphius tenuiscapus (Lindroth, 1961)
- Epaphius tiani Deuve, 2002
- Epaphius tosioi (Ueno, 1972)
- Epaphius vicarius (Bates, 1883)
- Epaphius wagneri (Ganglbauer, 1906)
- Epaphius yosiianus (Ueno, 1954)
- Epaphius yvesbousqueti (Donabauer, 2010)
