= Carabus albrechti =

Scientific classification
- Domain: Eukaryota
- Kingdom: Animalia
- Phylum: Arthropoda
- Class: Insecta
- Order: Coleoptera
- Suborder: Adephaga
- Family: Carabidae
- Genus: Carabus
- Species: C. albrechti

Binomial name
- Carabus albrechti Morawitz, 1862

Species of beetle

Carabus albrechti is a species of either black or brown coloured ground beetle in the subfamily Carabinae that is endemic to Japan.

== Subspecies ==
The species have 11 subspecies all of which could be found in Japan:

- Carabus albrechti albrechti Morawitz, 1862
- Carabus albrechti awashimae Ishikawa & Takami, 1996
- Carabus albrechti echigo Ishikawa & Takami, 1996
- Carabus albrechti esakianus Nakane, 1961
- Carabus albrechti freyi van Emden, 1932
- Carabus albrechti hagai Takami & Ishikawa, 1997
- Carabus albrechti hidakanus Ishikawa & Takami, 1996
- Carabus albrechti itoi Ishikawa & Takami, 1996
- Carabus albrechti okumurai (Ishikawa, 1966)
- Carabus albrechti tohokuensis (Ishikawa, 1984)
- Carabus albrechti tsukubanus Takami & Ishikawa, 1997
