= Epaphius dorsistriatus =

Scientific classification
- Kingdom: Animalia
- Phylum: Arthropoda
- Class: Insecta
- Order: Coleoptera
- Suborder: Adephaga
- Family: Carabidae
- Subfamily: Trechinae
- Tribe: Trechini
- Subtribe: Trechina
- Genus: Epaphius
- Species: E. dorsistriatus

Binomial name
- Epaphius dorsistriatus (Morawitz, 1862)

Synonyms
- Trechus dordistriatus; Trechus (Epaphius) dorsistriatus Morawitz , 1862

Species of beetle

Epaphius dorsistriatus is a species of ground beetle in the family Carabidae. It is found in Korea, Russia and Japan.

It was first described in 1862 as Trechus dorsistriatus by August Morawitz.
