= Epaphius orientosinicus =

Scientific classification
- Kingdom: Animalia
- Phylum: Arthropoda
- Class: Insecta
- Order: Coleoptera
- Suborder: Adephaga
- Family: Carabidae
- Subfamily: Trechinae
- Tribe: Trechini
- Subtribe: Trechina
- Genus: Epaphius
- Species: E. orientosinicus

Binomial name
- Epaphius orientosinicus Deuve, 1992

Synonyms
- Trechus orientosinicus (Deuve, 1992)

Species of beetle

Epaphius orientosinicus is a species in the beetle family Carabidae. It is found in China.
