= Carabus albrechti hidakanus =

Scientific classification
- Domain: Eukaryota
- Kingdom: Animalia
- Phylum: Arthropoda
- Class: Insecta
- Order: Coleoptera
- Suborder: Adephaga
- Family: Carabidae
- Genus: Carabus
- Species: C. albrechti
- Subspecies: C. a. hidakanus

Trinomial name
- Carabus albrechti hidakanus Ishikawa & Takami, 1996

Subspecies of beetle

Carabus albrechti hidakanus is a subspecies of ground beetle in the family Carabidae that is endemic to Japan.
