= Carabus jankowskii taebeagsanensis =

Scientific classification
- Domain: Eukaryota
- Kingdom: Animalia
- Phylum: Arthropoda
- Class: Insecta
- Order: Coleoptera
- Suborder: Adephaga
- Family: Carabidae
- Genus: Carabus
- Species: C. jankowskii
- Subspecies: C. j. taebeagsanensis

Trinomial name
- Carabus jankowskii taebeagsanensis (Ishikawa & Kim, 1983)

Subspecies of beetle

Carabus jankowskii taebeagsanensis is a subspecies of beetle in the family Carabidae. They are black coloured with brown pronotum.
