= Carabus albrechti tsukubanus =

Scientific classification
- Domain: Eukaryota
- Kingdom: Animalia
- Phylum: Arthropoda
- Class: Insecta
- Order: Coleoptera
- Suborder: Adephaga
- Family: Carabidae
- Genus: Carabus
- Species: C. albrechti
- Subspecies: C. a. tsukubanus

Trinomial name
- Carabus albrechti tsukubanus Takami & Ishikawa, 1997

Subspecies of beetle

Carabus albrechti tsukubanus is a subspecies of ground beetle in the subfamily Carabinae that is endemic to Japan.
