= Epaphius chalybeus =

Scientific classification
- Kingdom: Animalia
- Phylum: Arthropoda
- Class: Insecta
- Order: Coleoptera
- Suborder: Adephaga
- Family: Carabidae
- Genus: Epaphius
- Species: E. chalybeus

Binomial name
- Epaphius chalybeus (Dejean, 1831)

Synonyms
- Trechus chalybeus Dejean, 1831

Species of beetle

Epaphius chalybeus is a species of beetle in the family Carabidae. It is found in North America.

== Subspecies ==
These four subspecies belong to the species Epaphius chalybeus:

- Epaphius chalybeus brachyderus Jeannel
- Epaphius chalybeus chalybeus
- Epaphius chalybeus coloradensis Schaeffer
- Epaphius chalybeus utahensis Schaeffer
