= Epaphius chinensis =

Scientific classification
- Domain: Eukaryota
- Kingdom: Animalia
- Phylum: Arthropoda
- Class: Insecta
- Order: Coleoptera
- Suborder: Adephaga
- Family: Carabidae
- Subfamily: Trechinae
- Tribe: Trechini
- Subtribe: Trechina
- Genus: Epaphius
- Species: E. chinensis

Binomial name
- Epaphius chinensis (Jeannel, 1920)

Synonyms
- Trechus chinensis

Species of beetle

Epaphius chinensis is a species of ground beetle in the family Carabidae. It is found in China.
