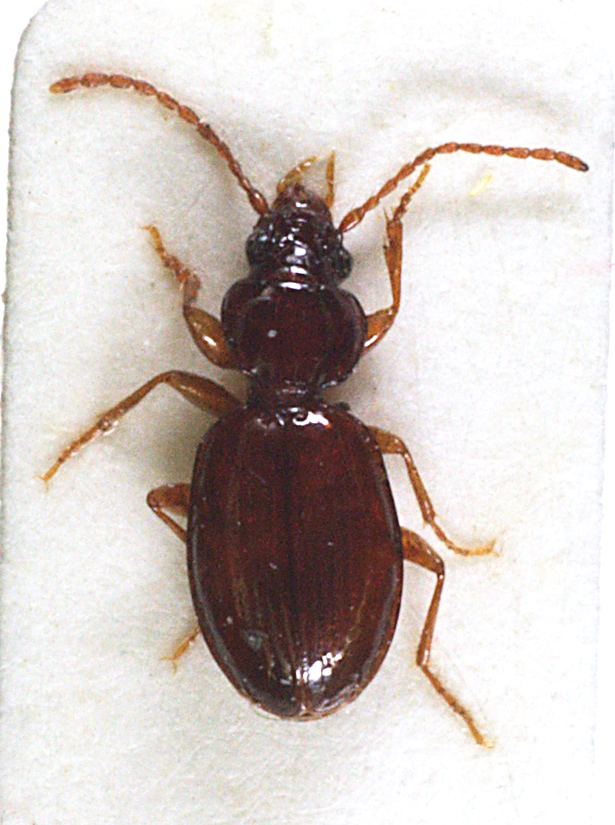

Scientific classification
- Kingdom: Animalia
- Phylum: Arthropoda
- Class: Insecta
- Order: Coleoptera
- Suborder: Adephaga
- Family: Carabidae
- Genus: Epaphius
- Species: E. secalis

Binomial name
- Epaphius secalis (Paykull, 1790)

Synonyms
- Trechus secalis

= Epaphius secalis =

Species of beetle

Trechus secalis is a species of ground beetle in the Trechinae subfamily. It is found in the Palearctic.

== Subspecies ==
These two subspecies belong to the species Epaphius secalis:

- Epaphius secalis georgicus Jeannel, 1962
- Epaphius secalis secalis (Paykull, 1790)
