= Epaphius nishikawai =

Scientific classification
- Kingdom: Animalia
- Phylum: Arthropoda
- Clade: Pancrustacea
- Class: Insecta
- Order: Coleoptera
- Suborder: Adephaga
- Family: Carabidae
- Subfamily: Trechinae
- Tribe: Trechini
- Subtribe: Trechina
- Genus: Epaphius
- Species: E. nishikawai

Binomial name
- Epaphius nishikawai (Ueno, 1991)

Synonyms
- Trechus nishikawai

Species of beetle

Epaphius nishikawai is a species of ground beetle that belongs to the tribe Trechini. It is native to Japan.
