= Calosoma maximowiczi =

Scientific classification
- Kingdom: Animalia
- Phylum: Arthropoda
- Class: Insecta
- Order: Coleoptera
- Suborder: Adephaga
- Family: Carabidae
- Genus: Calosoma
- Species: C. maximowiczi

Binomial name
- Calosoma maximowiczi A. Morawitz, 1863

Species of beetle

Calosoma maximowiczi is a species of ground beetle in the subfamily of Carabinae. It was described by August Morawitz in 1863.

It is native to Japan, China, Russia, Taiwan, and Korea.

Unlike most species in this family, this beetle can fly. Adults feed on butterfly and moth larvae and are observed in midsummer in trees of broadleaf forests in mountainous places.
