= Epaphius castificus =

Scientific classification
- Kingdom: Animalia
- Phylum: Arthropoda
- Class: Insecta
- Order: Coleoptera
- Suborder: Adephaga
- Family: Carabidae
- Subfamily: Trechinae
- Tribe: Trechini
- Subtribe: Trechina
- Genus: Epaphius
- Species: E. castificus

Binomial name
- Epaphius castificus P.Moravec & Wrase, 1998

Synonyms
- Trechus castificus

Species of beetle

Epaphius castificus is a species of ground beetle in the family Carabidae. It is found in China.

== Subspecies ==
These two subspecies belong to the species Epaphius castificus:

- Epaphius castificus castificus P.Moravec & Wrase, 1998 (China)
- Epaphius castificus taibaicola Deuve, 2001 (China)
