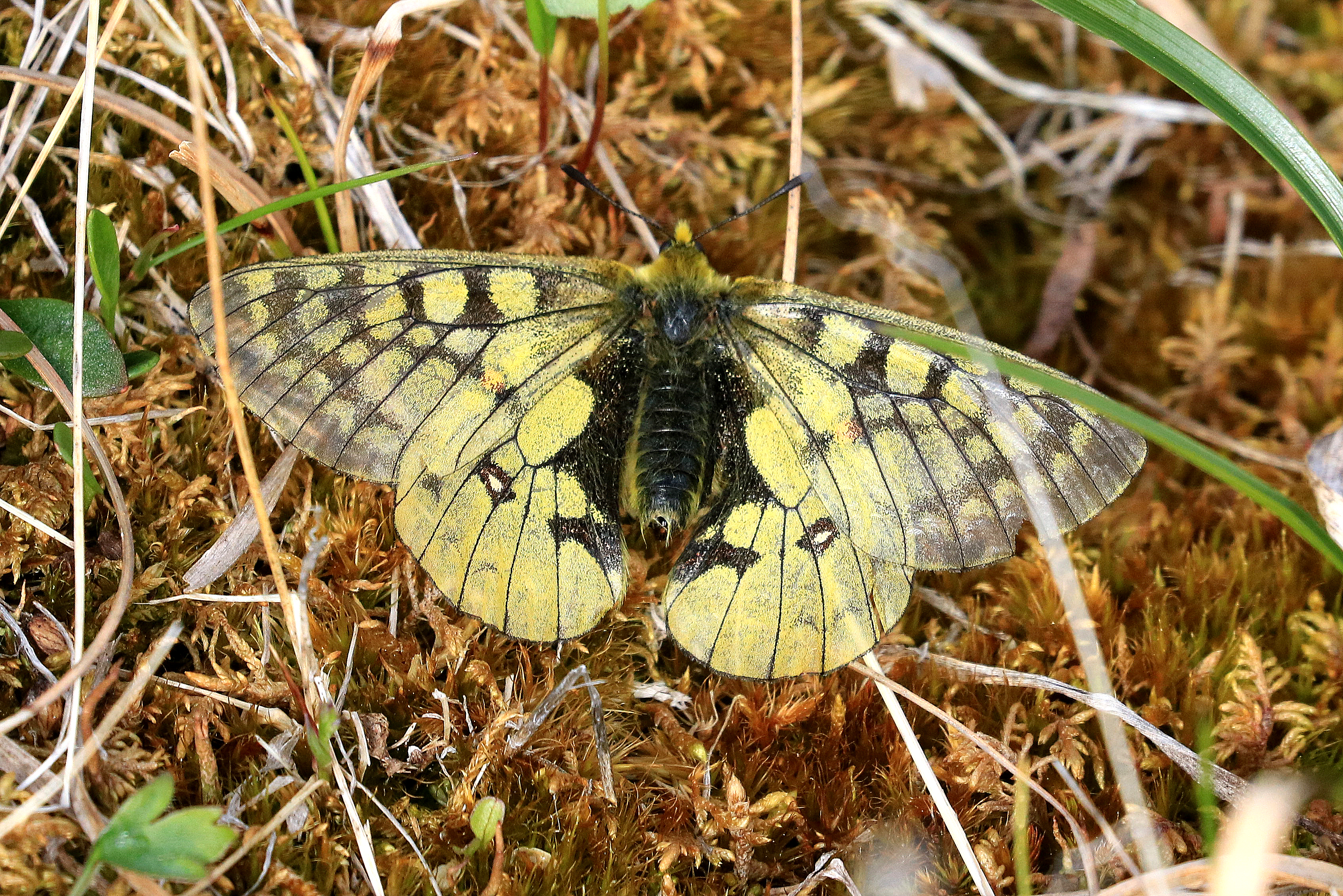

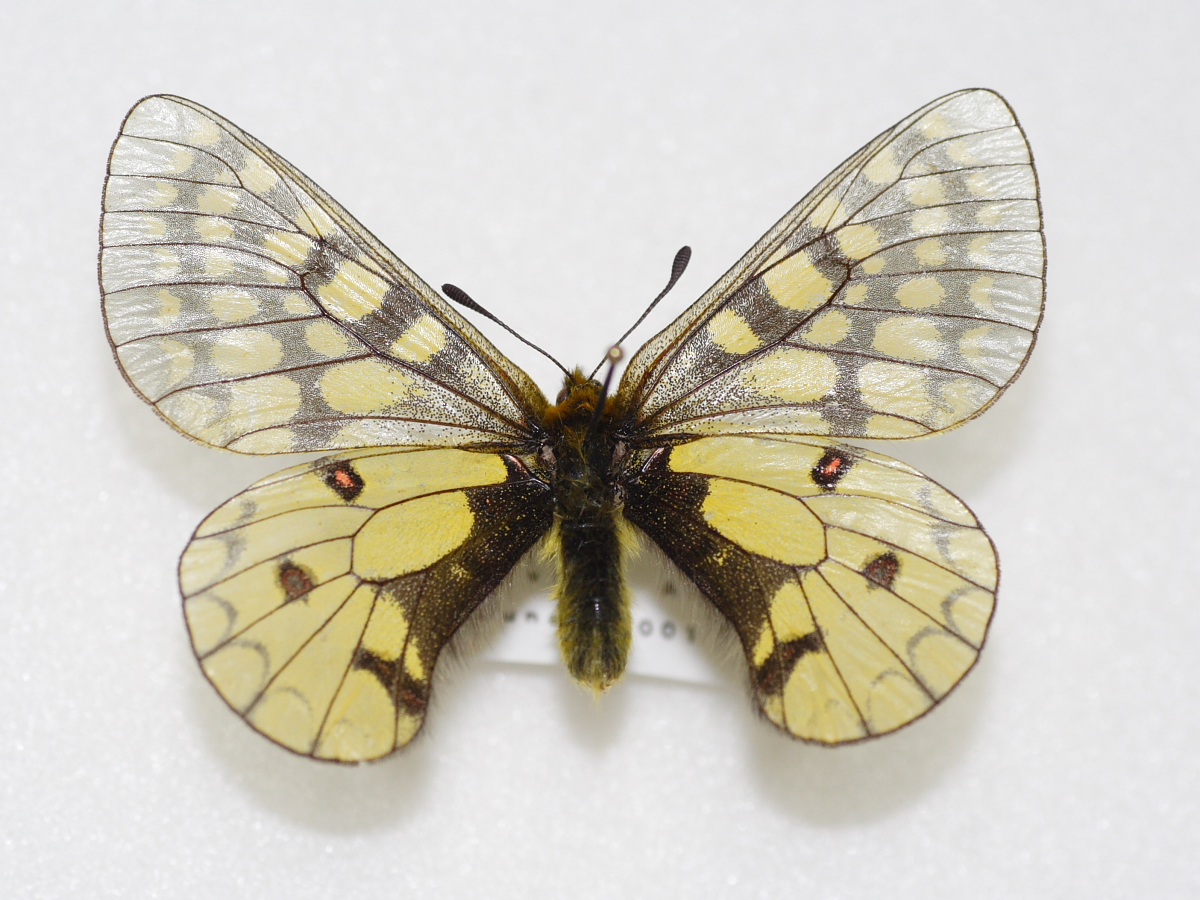
- Specimen from Russia

Conservation status
- Secure (NatureServe)

Scientific classification
- Kingdom: Animalia
- Phylum: Arthropoda
- Clade: Pancrustacea
- Class: Insecta
- Order: Lepidoptera
- Family: Papilionidae
- Genus: Parnassius
- Species: P. eversmanni

Binomial name
- Parnassius eversmanni Ménétries, 1849

Subspecies
- Parnassius eversmanni vosnessenskii; Parnassius eversmanni thor; Parnassius eversmanni daisetsuzanus; Parnassius eversmanni sasai; Parnassius eversmanni maui; Parnassius eversmanni litoreus; Parnassius eversmanni felderi
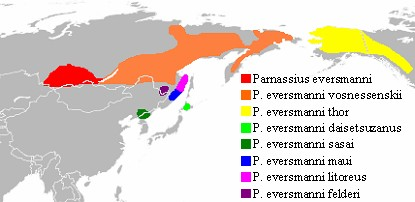

= Parnassius eversmanni =

Species of butterfly

Parnassius eversmanni, or Eversmann's parnassian, is a high-altitude butterfly which is found in eastern Russia, China, North Korea, Mongolia, Japan, Alaska, British Columbia and the Yukon. It is a member of the snow Apollo genus (Parnassius) of the swallowtail family, Papilionidae. The species was named to honour Eduard Friedrich Eversmann.

== Description ==
Note: The wing pattern in Parnassius species is inconsistent and the very many subspecies and forms make identification problematic and uncertain. Structural characters derived from the genitalia, wing venation, sphragis and foretibial epiphysis are more, but not entirely reliable. The description given here is a guide only. For an identification key see Ackery P.R. (1975).

Ground-colour yellow in male yellow or yellowish white in female. Resembles in pattern very closely the female of Parnassius felderi: forewing grey at base and costal margin, and greyish glossy at distal margin; beyond the cell a curved discal band shaded with grey and a similar, sometimes less distinct, submarginal one. Abdominal area of hindwing dusted with black; a spot at anal angle, occasionally (especially often in female) prolonged to a short band; a more or less distinct undulate submarginal band; further, two red ocelli, the posterior one sometimes being all black on upperside or being wanting, remaining however distinct below; base of hindwing above spotted with red. Head and body yellow haired.

The larva feeds on the Corydalis species C. gigantea, C. pauciflora, C. arctica, C. paeoniiholia, C. gorodkovi and C. pauciflora.
