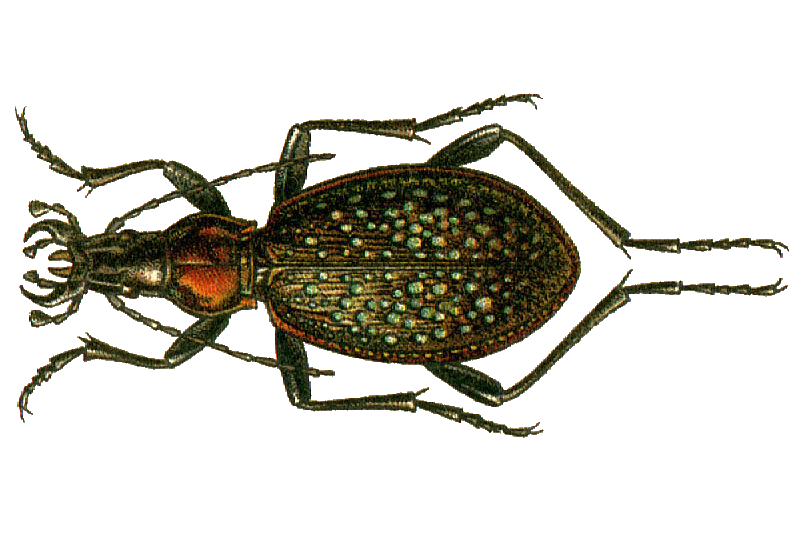

Scientific classification
- Domain: Eukaryota
- Kingdom: Animalia
- Phylum: Arthropoda
- Class: Insecta
- Order: Coleoptera
- Suborder: Adephaga
- Family: Carabidae
- Genus: Carabus
- Species: C. lopatini

Binomial name
- Carabus lopatini Morawitz, 1886

= Carabus lopatini =

Species of beetle

Carabus lopatini is a species of beetle from family Carabidae that is endemic to Sakhalin, Russia. They have black body and are shiny.
