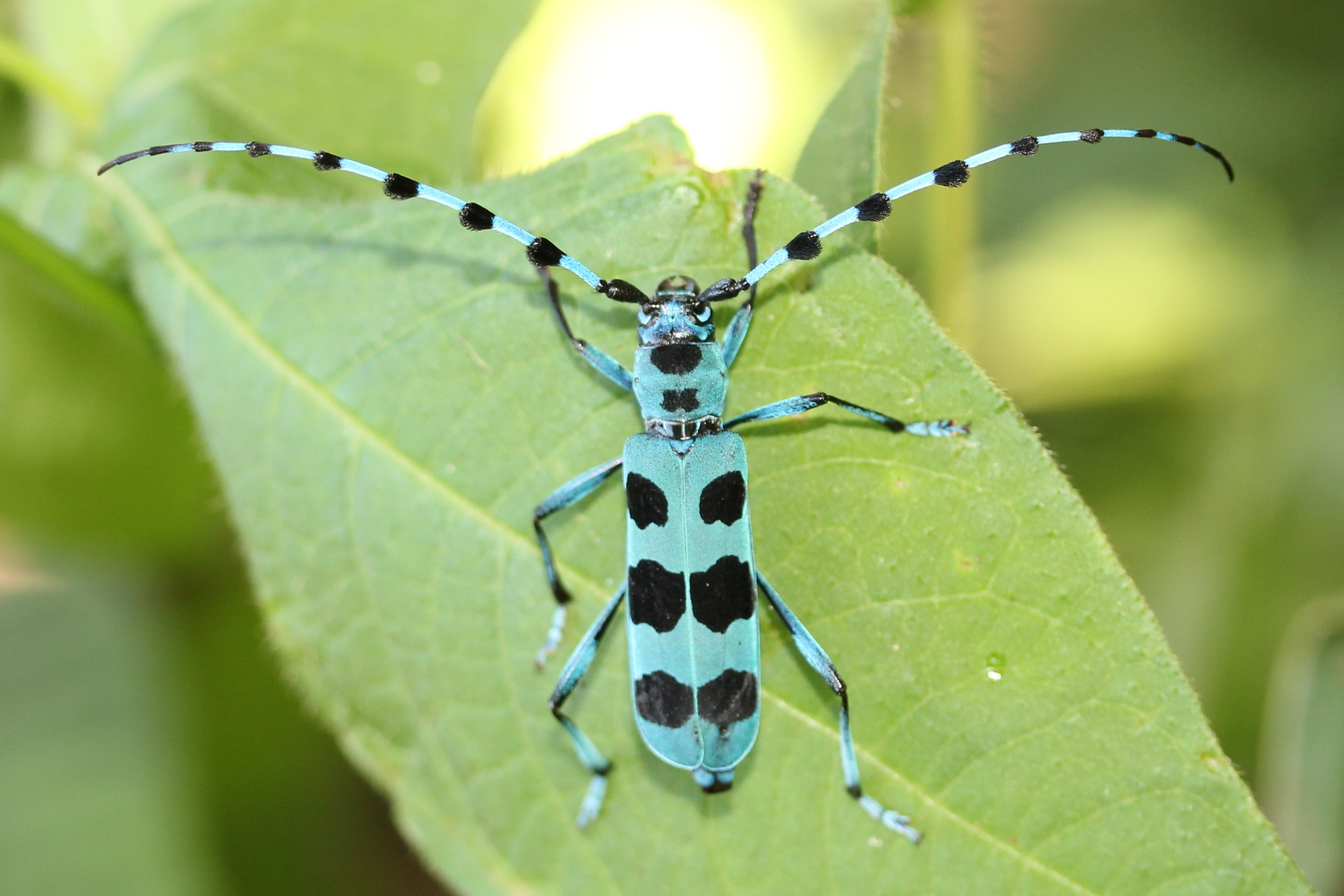
- Rosalia batesi

Scientific classification
- Domain: Eukaryota
- Kingdom: Animalia
- Phylum: Arthropoda
- Class: Insecta
- Order: Coleoptera
- Suborder: Polyphaga
- Infraorder: Cucujiformia
- Family: Cerambycidae
- Tribe: Compsocerini
- Genus: Rosalia; Audinet-Serville, 1833

= Rosalia (beetle) =

Genus of beetles

Rosalia is a genus of longhorn beetles in the family Cerambycidae.

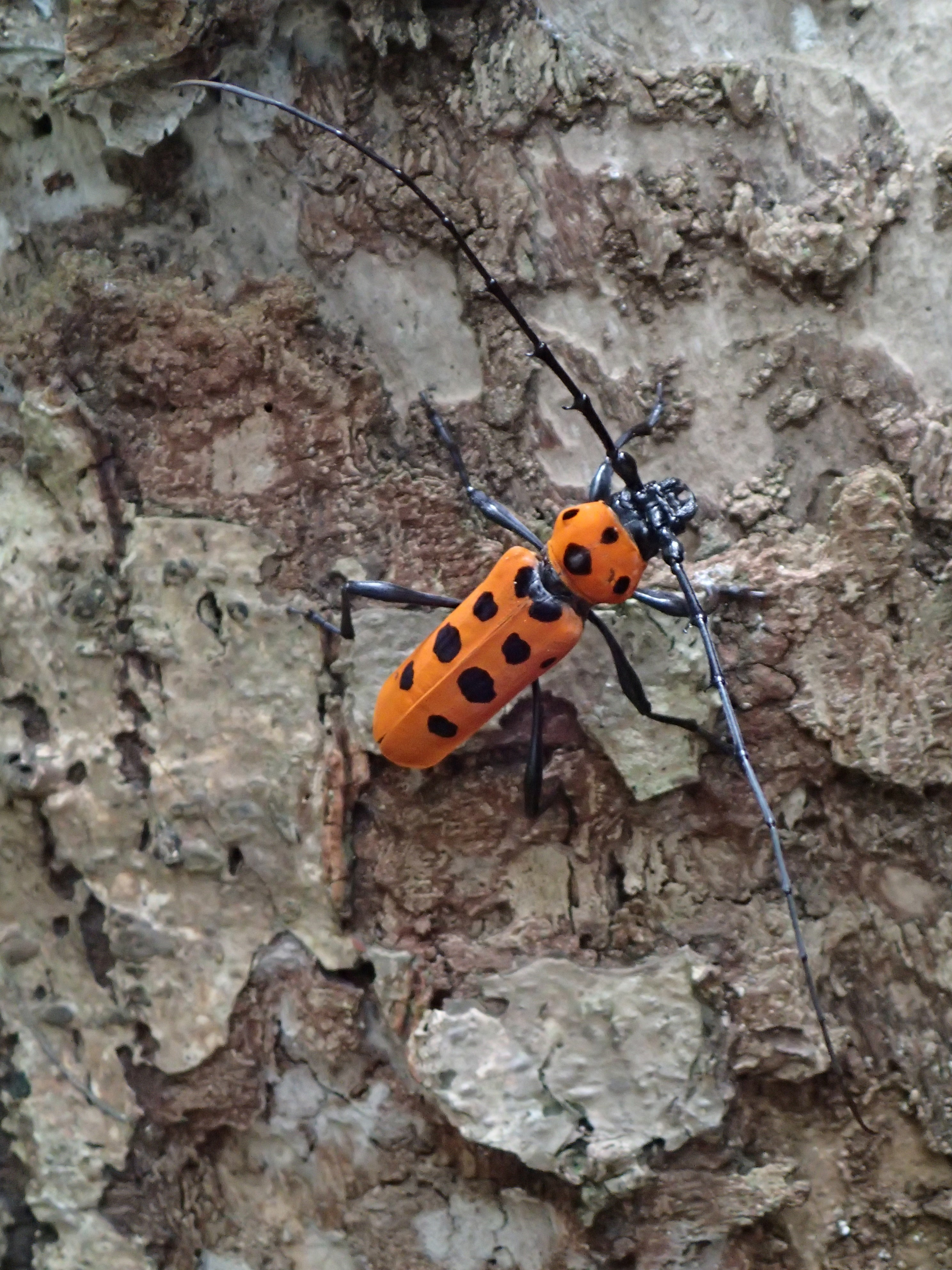
Rosalia ferriei . A male waiting for a female on dead tree trunk.

== Species ==
Rosalia contains the following species:

- Rosalia alpina (Linnaeus, 1758) – Rosalia longicorn
- Rosalia batesi Harold, 1877
- Rosalia birmanicus (Itzinger, 1943)
- Rosalia borneensis (Rothschild & Jordan, 1893)
- Rosalia bouvieri Boppe, 1910
- Rosalia breveapicalis (Pic, 1946)
- Rosalia coelestis Semenov, 1911
- Rosalia decempunctata (Westwood, 1848)
- Rosalia dejeani Vuillet, 1911
- Rosalia ferriei Vuillet, 1911
- Rosalia formosa (Saunders, 1839)
- Rosalia funebris Motschulsky, 1845 - Banded Alder Borer
- Rosalia gravida Lameere, 1887
- Rosalia hariola (Thomson, 1861)
- Rosalia houlberti Vuillet, 1911
- Rosalia inexpectata Ritsema, 1890
- Rosalia kubotai Takakuwa, 1994
- Rosalia laeta Lameere, 1906
- Rosalia lameerei Brongniart, 1890
- Rosalia lateritia (Hope, 1831)
- Rosalia lesnei Boppe, 1911
- Rosalia novempunctata Westwood, 1848
- Rosalia oberthueri Vuillet, 1911
- Rosalia ogurai Takakuwa & Karube, 1997
- Rosalia pachycornis Takakuwa & Karube, 1997
- Rosalia sanguinolenta Takakuwa & Karube, 1997
- Rosalia sondaica Kreische, 1920
- Rosalia splendens Karube, 1996
