= Carabus jankowskii jankowskii =

Scientific classification
- Domain: Eukaryota
- Kingdom: Animalia
- Phylum: Arthropoda
- Class: Insecta
- Order: Coleoptera
- Suborder: Adephaga
- Family: Carabidae
- Genus: Carabus
- Species: C. jankowskii
- Subspecies: C. j. jankowskii

Trinomial name
- Carabus jankowskii jankowskii Oberthür, 1883

Subspecies of beetle

Carabus jankowskii jankowskii is a subspecies of black coloured beetle from family Carabidae.
