= Epaphius arsenjevi =

Scientific classification
- Kingdom: Animalia
- Phylum: Arthropoda
- Class: Insecta
- Order: Coleoptera
- Suborder: Adephaga
- Family: Carabidae
- Subfamily: Trechinae
- Tribe: Trechini
- Subtribe: Trechina
- Genus: Epaphius
- Species: E. arsenjevi

Binomial name
- Epaphius arsenjevi Jeannel, 1962

Synonyms
- Trechus arsenjevi

Species of beetle

Epaphius arsenjevi is a species of ground beetle in the family Carabidae. It is found in Russia.
