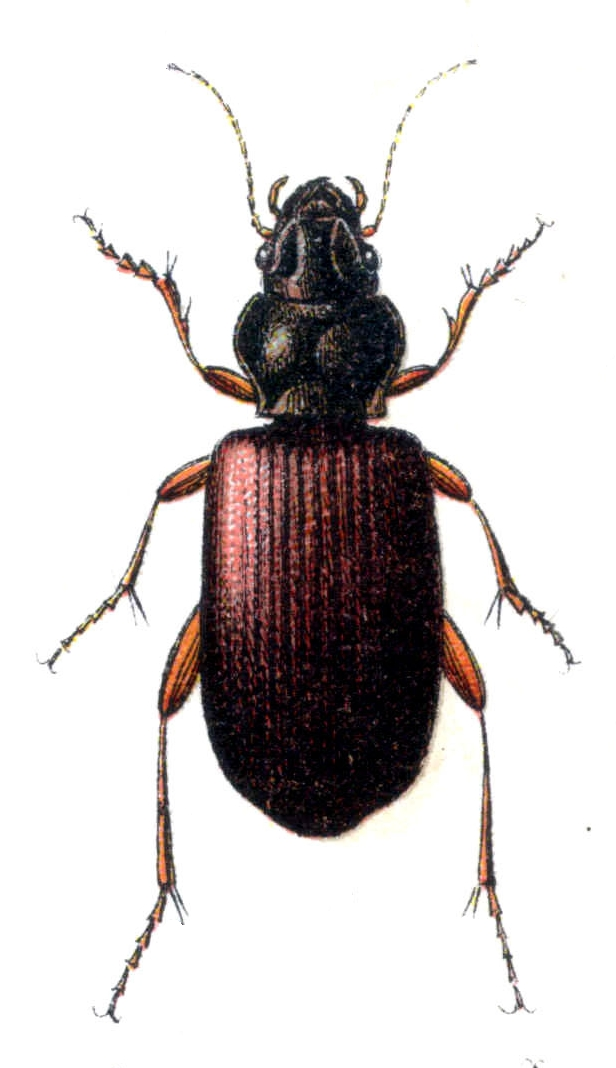

Scientific classification
- Kingdom: Animalia
- Phylum: Arthropoda
- Clade: Pancrustacea
- Class: Insecta
- Order: Coleoptera
- Suborder: Adephaga
- Family: Carabidae
- Genus: Epaphius
- Species: E. rubens

Binomial name
- Epaphius rubens (Fabricius, 1792)

Synonyms
- Trechus rubens Fabricius, 1792

= Epaphius rubens =

Species of beetle

Epaphius rubens is a species of beetle in the family Carabidae.

== Description ==
Beetle in length from 5–6 millimetres (0.20–0.24 in). The upper body is reddish brown. That is common from eastern North America to Europe, Siberia.

== Ecology ==
Epaphius rubens lives under stones in rocky seaside environment.
