= Epaphius acco =

Scientific classification
- Kingdom: Animalia
- Phylum: Arthropoda
- Class: Insecta
- Order: Coleoptera
- Suborder: Adephaga
- Family: Carabidae
- Subfamily: Trechinae
- Tribe: Trechini
- Subtribe: Trechina
- Genus: Epaphius
- Species: E. acco

Binomial name
- Epaphius acco (Ueno, 1991)

Synonyms
- Trechus chinensis; Trechus acco

Species of beetle

Epaphius acco is a species of ground beetle in the family Carabidae. It is native to Japan.
