= Carabus albrechti okumurai =

Scientific classification
- Domain: Eukaryota
- Kingdom: Animalia
- Phylum: Arthropoda
- Class: Insecta
- Order: Coleoptera
- Suborder: Adephaga
- Family: Carabidae
- Genus: Carabus
- Species: C. albrechti
- Subspecies: C. a. okumurai

Trinomial name
- Carabus albrechti okumurai (Ishikawa, 1966)

Subspecies of beetle

Carabus albrechti okumurai is a subspecies of ground beetle in the family Carabidae that is endemic to Japan.
