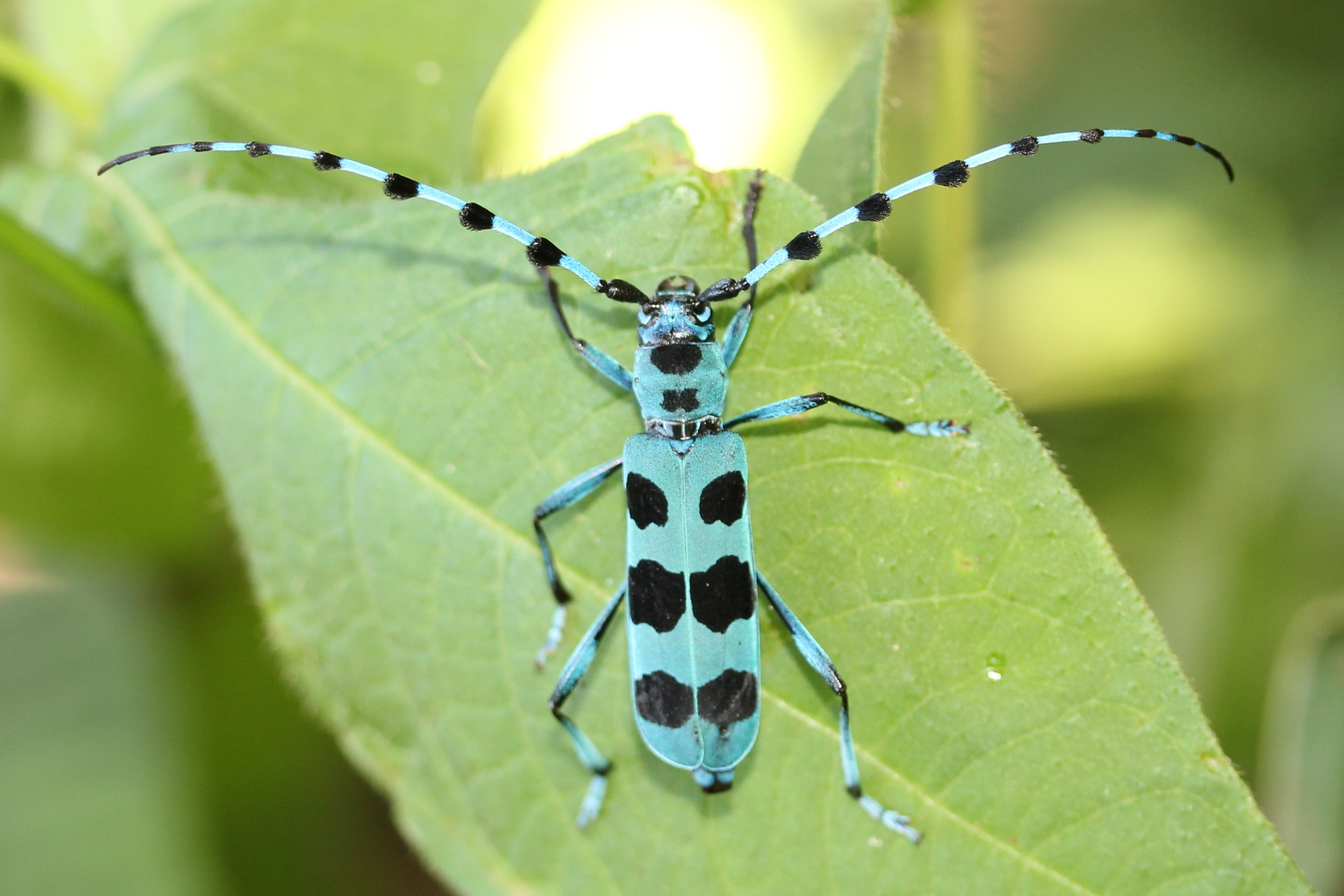

Scientific classification
- Kingdom: Animalia
- Phylum: Arthropoda
- Clade: Pancrustacea
- Class: Insecta
- Order: Coleoptera
- Suborder: Polyphaga
- Infraorder: Cucujiformia
- Family: Cerambycidae
- Genus: Rosalia
- Species: R. batesi

Binomial name
- Rosalia batesi Harold, 1877

= Rosalia batesi =

Species of beetle

Rosalia batesi is a species of beetle in the family Cerambycidae. It was described by Harold in 1877.

== Characteristics ==
The beetle is 25 to 28 millimeter long. It is related to the alpine Rosalia longicorn. Compared to the alpine longicorn beetle, it is more narrow and the humps on the sides of the neck shield are much less pronounced. On the neck shield Rosalia batesi has two consecutive black blemishes, of which the back one is either missing or fused with the front one. The elytra carry three black transverse bandages, which lack the bright border of Rosalia alpina. In contrast to this, the arrangement of the black blemishes is also different, a round spot in the front, in the middle a somewhat crooked transverse bandage of two obliquely placed against the tip, at the back a larger spot, which sometimes flows together with the bandage along the elytra seam.

== Distribution and way of life ==
It is an endemic species of Japan, where it occurs in the mountains, from medium altitudes to the subalpine zone. There are indications that the species has spread to lower regions in recent decades, even to urban areas.

The larvae of the species live in hard dry dead wood of numerous deciduous tree species, without special preference of a certain species, are documented willows (Salix), walnut (Juglans), wingnutd (Pterocarya), birch (Betula), hornbeam (Carpinus), beech (Fagus), elm (Ulmus), magnolia (Magnolia), Kuchenbaum (Cercidiphyllum), Ahorn (Acer), oriental raisin tree (Hovenia), Japanese snowbell (Styrax), horse chestnut (Aesculus), Japanese elm Zelkove (Zelkova). Egg-laying takes place on standing dead tree trunks, but also on felled and stored tree trunks and firewood logs, including dechipped trees. The beetles occasionally hatch from firewood or already installed wood. The larvae dig irregular passages into the wood, where they do not avoid the heartwood; in thin trunks, a certain preference of the central sections was even found.

The adult beetles occasionally visit flowers and are also found by the juice flow of wounded living trees. During mating, the females specifically seek out males of the species, which they recognize by specific pheromones. Pheromones are released in a special organ at the eighth segment of the abdomen.

== Literature ==
- E. von Harold (1877): Beiträge zur Käferfauna von Japan (Zweites Stück.) Deutsche Entomologische Zeitschrift 21 (11): 337–367. (Erstbeschreibung)
- N. N. Plavilstshikov: Bestimmungs-Tabellen der europäischen Coleopteren. 112. Heft Cerambycidae III. Teil. Cerambycinae: Cerambycini III. (Callichromina, Rosaliina, Callidiina), Troppau 1934
- Ryûtarô Iwata, Masahiro Aoki, Takanori Nozaki, Mutsuko Yamaguchi (1998): Some notes on the biology of a hardwood-log-boring longhorn-beetle, Rosalia batesi Harold (Coleoptera: Cerambycidae), with special reference to its occurrences in a building and a suburban lumberyard. Japanese journal of environmental entomology and zoology 9 (3): 83–97.
- Satoshi Kiriyama, Ryûtarô Iwata, Midori Fukaya, Youtaro Hoshino, Yasuyuki Yamanaka (2018): Mating Behavior of Rosalia batesi (Coleoptera: Cerambycidae) Is Mediated by Male-Produced Sex Pheromones. Insects 9, article 48, doi:10.3390/insects9020048
