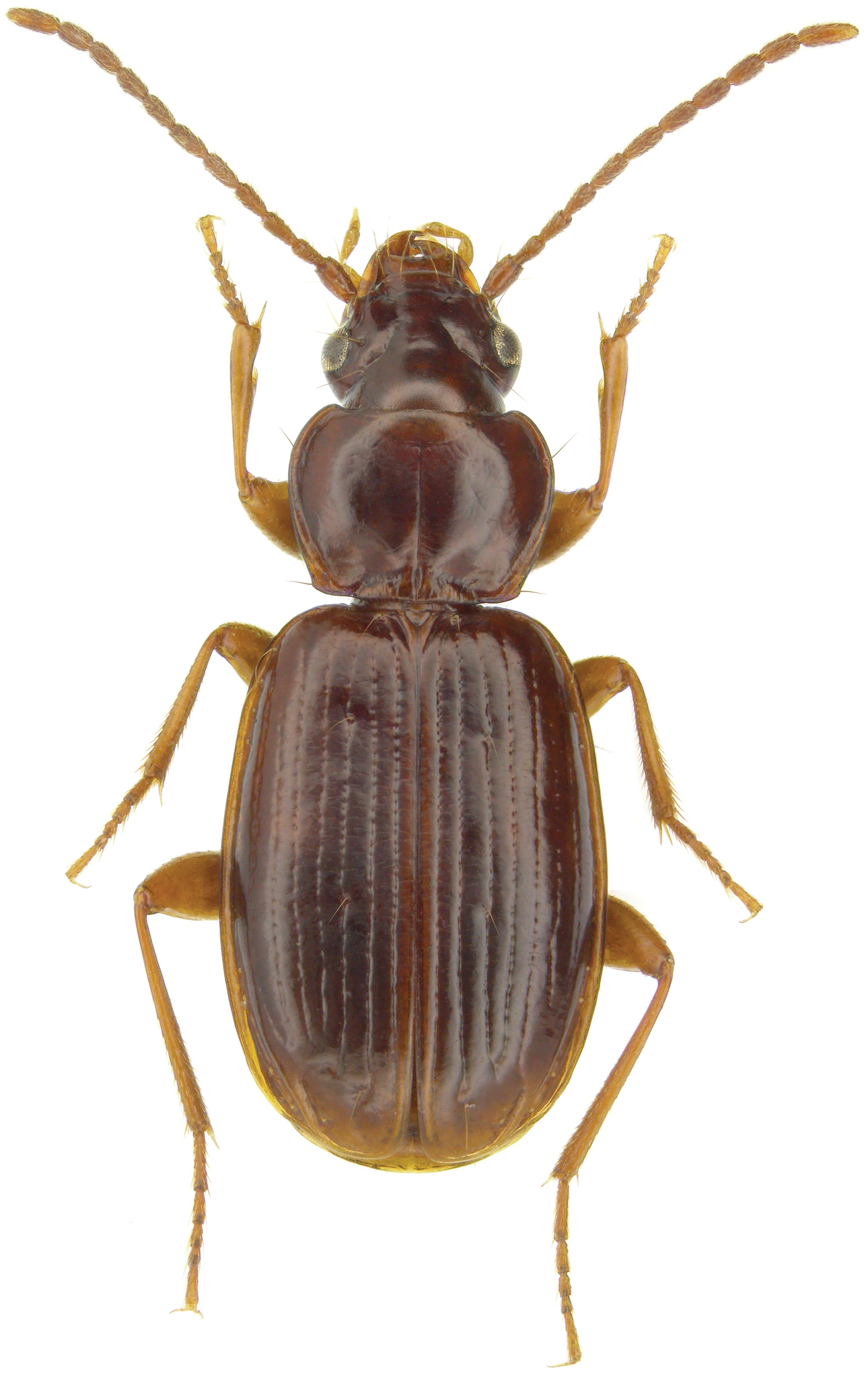

Scientific classification
- Domain: Eukaryota
- Kingdom: Animalia
- Phylum: Arthropoda
- Class: Insecta
- Order: Coleoptera
- Suborder: Adephaga
- Family: Carabidae
- Genus: Epaphius
- Species: E. apicalis

Binomial name
- Epaphius apicalis (Motschulsky, 1845)

Synonyms
- Trechus apicalis Motschulsky, 1845

= Epaphius apicalis =

Species of beetle

Epaphius apicalis is a species of beetle in the family Carabidae. It is found in North America and Northern Eurasia.

This species is sometimes considered to be in the genus Trechus.
