= Trechus amplicollis =

Scientific classification
- Kingdom: Animalia
- Phylum: Arthropoda
- Class: Insecta
- Order: Coleoptera
- Suborder: Adephaga
- Family: Carabidae
- Subfamily: Trechinae
- Genus: Trechus
- Species: T. amplicollis

Binomial name
- Trechus amplicollis Fairmaire, 1859

Synonyms
- Epaphius amplicollis (Fairmaire, 1859)

Species of beetle

Trechus amplicollis is a species in the beetle family Carabidae. It is found in Europe.

This species was proposed to be transferred to the genus Epaphius in 2019, but remains classified in Trechus according to Catalogue of Life, Carabcat Database, GBIF, and others.
