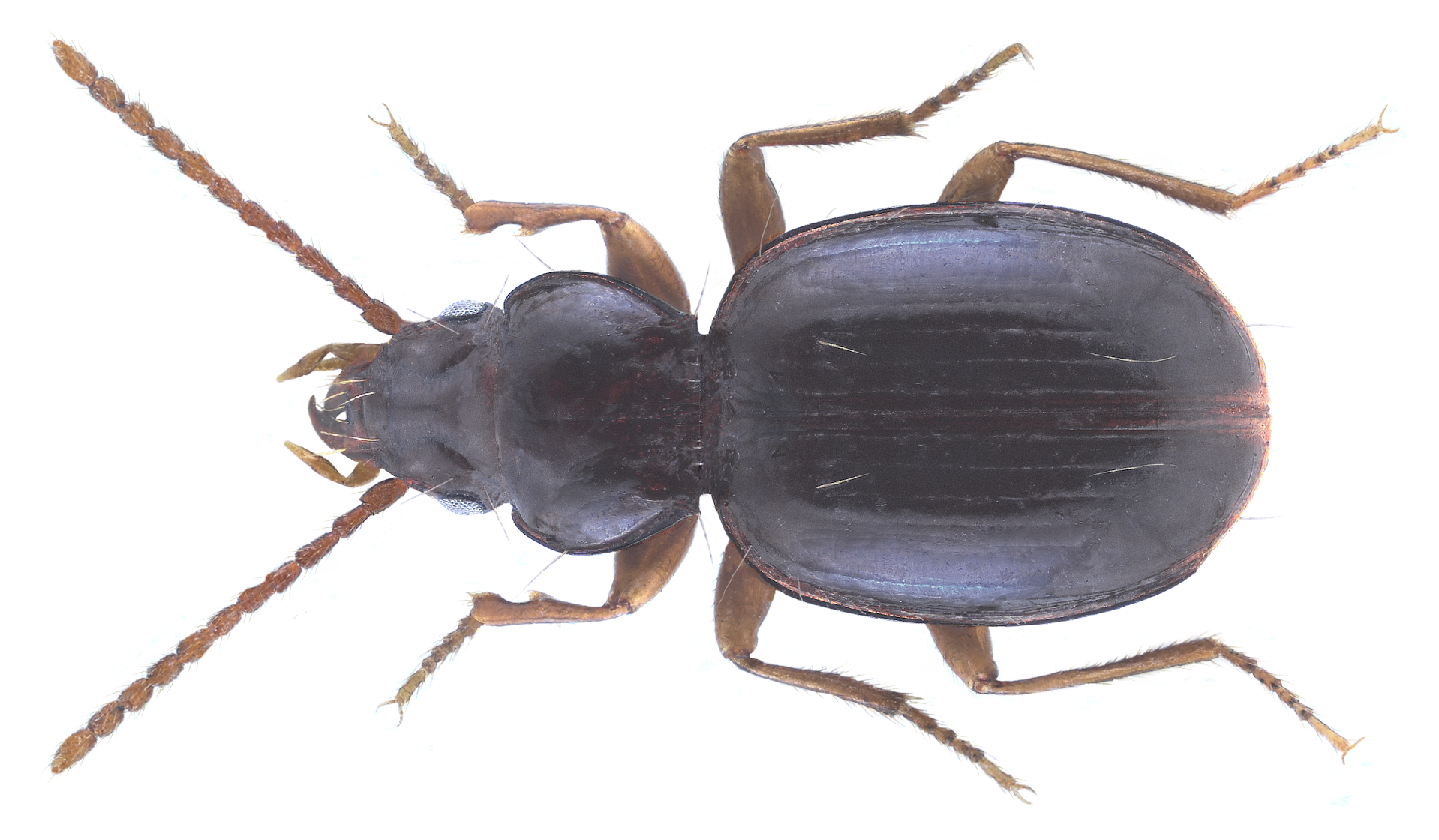

Scientific classification
- Kingdom: Animalia
- Phylum: Arthropoda
- Class: Insecta
- Order: Coleoptera
- Suborder: Adephaga
- Family: Carabidae
- Subfamily: Trechinae
- Genus: Trechus
- Species: T. alpicola

Binomial name
- Trechus alpicola Sturm, 1825

Synonyms
- Epaphius alpicola (Sturm, 1825)

= Trechus alpicola =

Species of beetle

Trechus alpicola is a species in the beetle family Carabidae. It is found in Europe.

This species is sometimes placed under the genus Epaphius .

== Subspecies ==
These two subspecies belong to the species Trechus alpicola:

- Trechus alpicola acutangulus Apfelbeck, 1902 (Bosnia-Herzegovina)
- Trechus alpicola alpicola Sturm, 1825 (Germany, Austria, Czechia, Poland, and Slovenia)
