= Rosalia lameerei =

Scientific classification
- Domain: Eukaryota
- Kingdom: Animalia
- Phylum: Arthropoda
- Class: Insecta
- Order: Coleoptera
- Suborder: Polyphaga
- Infraorder: Cucujiformia
- Family: Cerambycidae
- Genus: Rosalia
- Species: R. lameerei

Binomial name
- Rosalia lameerei Brogn, 1890

Species of beetle

Rosalia lameerei is a species of beetle in the family Cerambycidae. It was described by Brogn in 1890.
