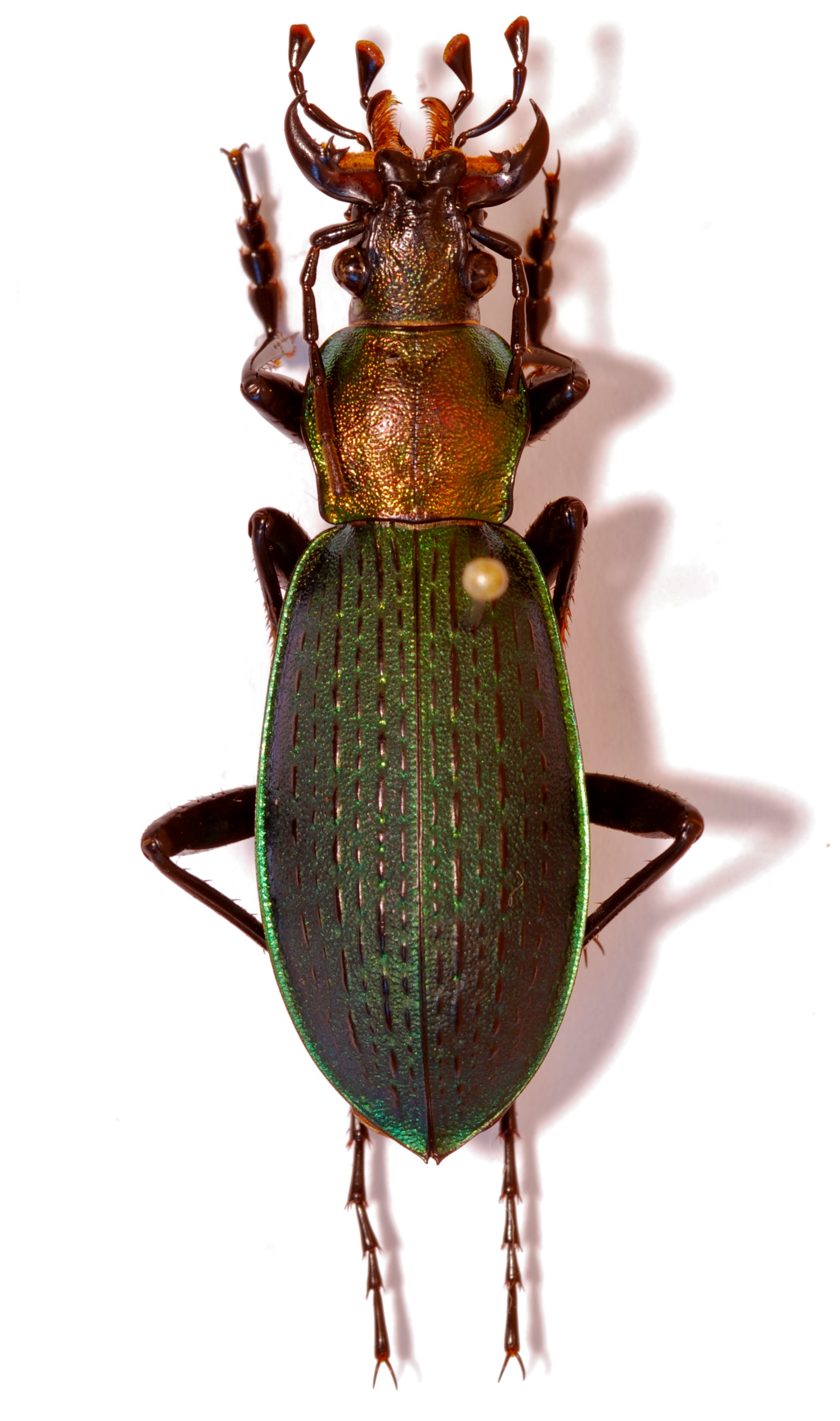

Scientific classification
- Domain: Eukaryota
- Kingdom: Animalia
- Phylum: Arthropoda
- Class: Insecta
- Order: Coleoptera
- Suborder: Adephaga
- Family: Carabidae
- Genus: Carabus
- Species: C. jankowskii

Binomial name
- Carabus jankowskii Oberthür, 1883

= Carabus jankowskii =

Species of beetle

Carabus jankowskii is a species of beetle from family Carabidae. The species are black coloured with brown pronotum. Carabus jankowskii can be found in Russia, China, North Korea, and South Korea.

Subspecies include:

- Carabus jankowskii jankowskii
- Carabus jankowskii taebeagsanensis
