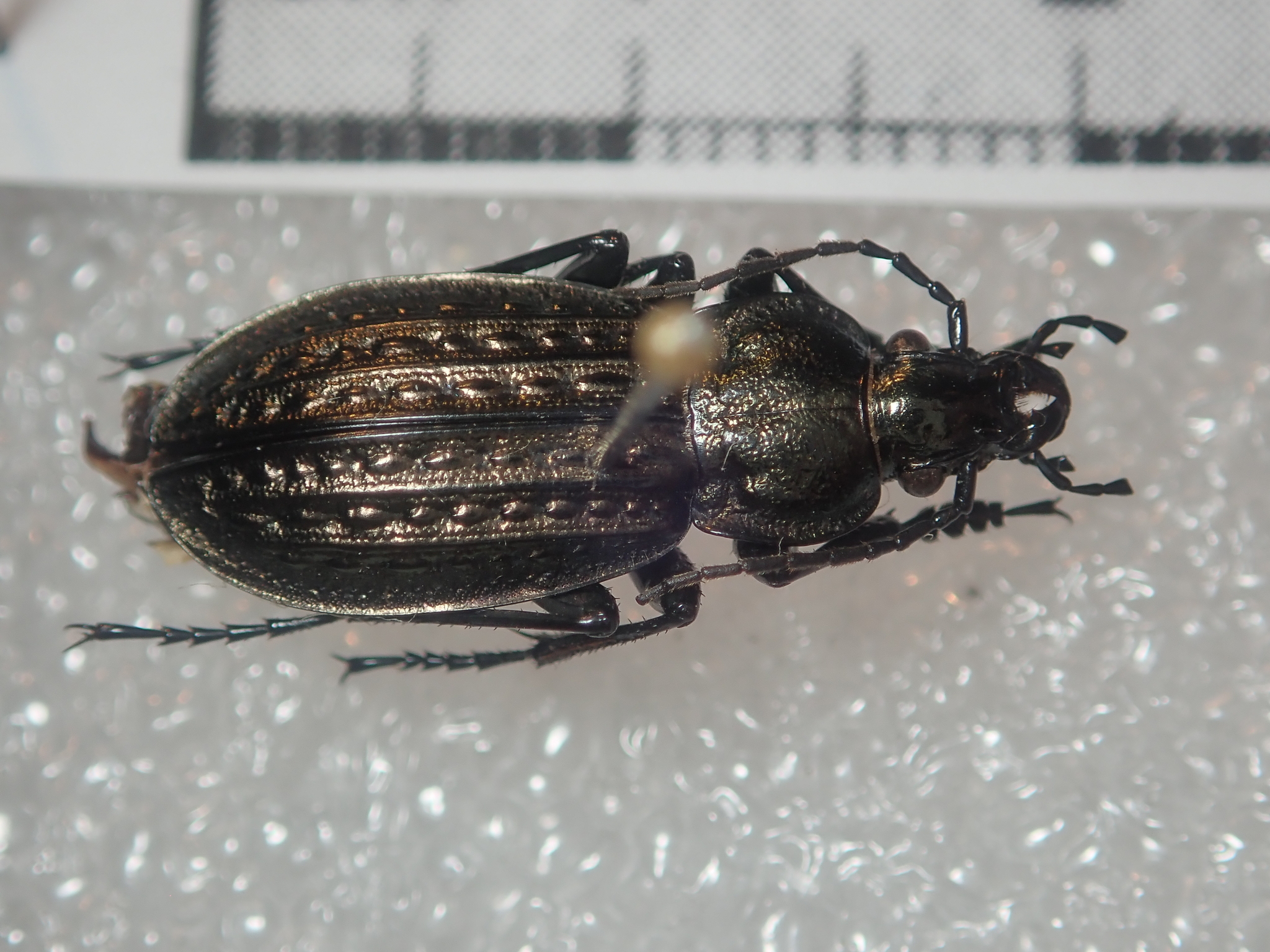

Scientific classification
- Domain: Eukaryota
- Kingdom: Animalia
- Phylum: Arthropoda
- Class: Insecta
- Order: Coleoptera
- Suborder: Adephaga
- Family: Carabidae
- Genus: Carabus
- Species: C. menetriesi

Binomial name
- Carabus menetriesi Hummel, 1827

= Carabus menetriesi =

Species of beetle

Carabus menetriesi is a species of beetle from family Carabidae, found in Austria, Belarus, Bulgaria, Czech Republic, Finland, Italy, Poland, Russia, Slovakia, and Ukraine, and the Baltic states. They are black coloured.
