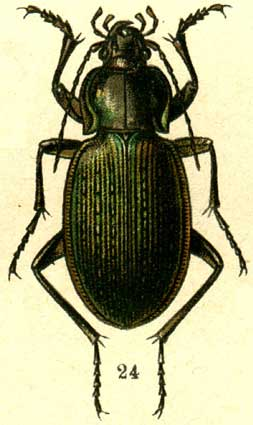

Scientific classification
- Domain: Eukaryota
- Kingdom: Animalia
- Phylum: Arthropoda
- Class: Insecta
- Order: Coleoptera
- Suborder: Adephaga
- Family: Carabidae
- Genus: Carabus
- Species: C. gebleri

Binomial name
- Carabus gebleri Fischer von Waldheim, 1817

= Carabus gebleri =

Species of beetle

Carabus gebleri is a species of beetle found in Russia and Kazakhstan.
