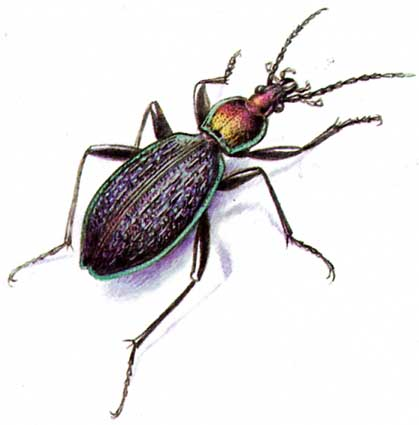
- Carabus avinovi

Scientific classification
- Domain: Eukaryota
- Kingdom: Animalia
- Phylum: Arthropoda
- Class: Insecta
- Order: Coleoptera
- Suborder: Adephaga
- Family: Carabidae
- Genus: Carabus
- Species: C. avinovi

Binomial name
- Carabus avinovi Semenov & Znojko, 1932

= Carabus avinovi =

Species of beetle

Carabus avinovi is a species of ground beetle in the large genus Carabus.
