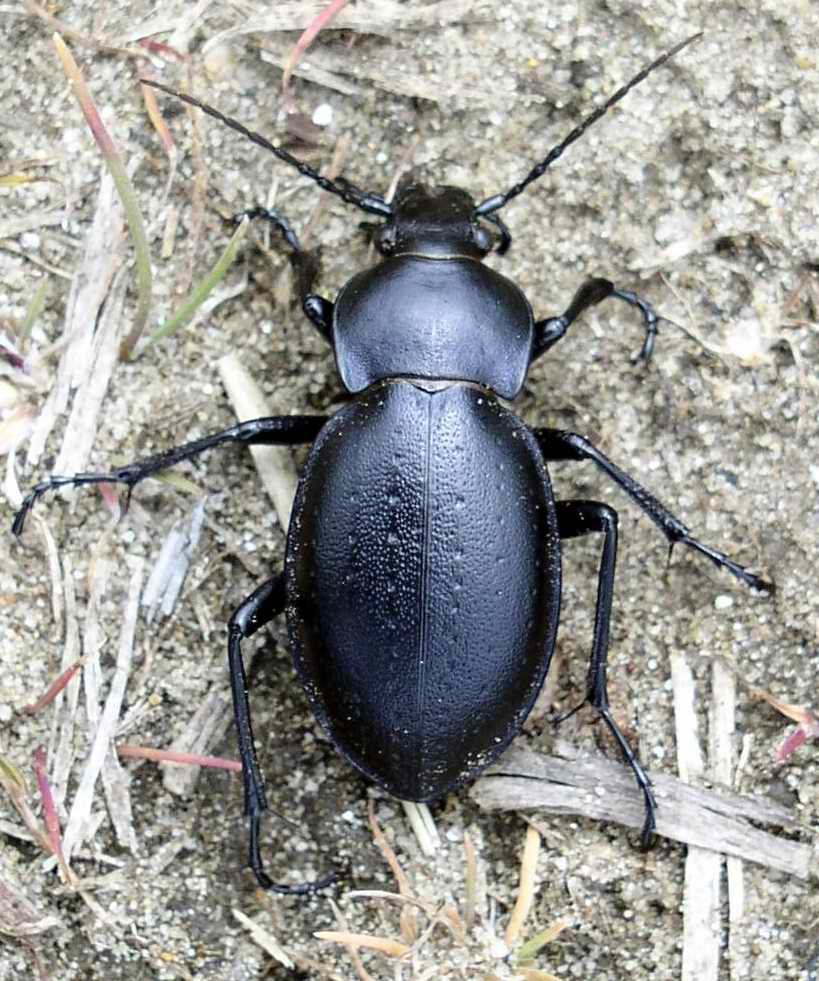

Scientific classification
- Domain: Eukaryota
- Kingdom: Animalia
- Phylum: Arthropoda
- Class: Insecta
- Order: Coleoptera
- Suborder: Adephaga
- Family: Carabidae
- Genus: Carabus
- Species: C. hungaricus

Binomial name
- Carabus hungaricus Fabricius, 1792

Subspecies
- C. h. cribellatus; C. h. scythus; C. h. gastridulus; C. h. mingens; C. h. frivaldskyanus; C. h. hungaricus

= Carabus hungaricus =

Species of beetle

== Distribution ==
Carabus hungaricus is a beetle species native to the Palearctic. The European distribution of Carabus hungaricus is disjunctive – three major distribution areas can be distinguished: A) Ukrainian and Russian steppes, B) Bulgaria (small isolated area), and C) the Carpathian Basin. In its whole distribution area, the habitats where this species occurs are fragmented, and as a result often isolated. In Europe, it is found in Austria, Bulgaria, the Czech Republic, Hungary, Moldova, Romania, central and southern Russia, Serbia, Slovakia and Ukraine. It is a typical steppe species, inhabits sandy grasslands and dolomitic grasslands. The majority of its populations inhabit calcareous sandy grasslands from the Deliblat (Serbia: Deliblatska Peščara) throughout the Banat (Serbia, Romania) and sandy areas in Hungary along the Danube River all the way to Vienna (Austria) and South Moravia (Czech Republic). Numerous populations occur on acidic types of sand grasslands in the Nyírség area, near the city of Debrecen (Hungary). A classical collecting place for this beetle was in the dolomitic grasslands of Buda Mountains, near Budapest the capital city of Hungary.

== Taxonomic status ==
The type locality “Hungaria” in Johan Christian Fabricius’ description from 1792 refers most likely to the Buda Mountains, which was undoubtedly a place frequently visited by collectors and naturalists of that time. The type specimen is in that part of Fabricius' collection that is at the Zoological Museum of Kiel University. In the Pannonian Region, two taxa have been described besides the nominotypic subspecies: hungaricus viennensis Kraatz, 1877, living in the Vienna Basin (Austria) and in South Moravia (Czech Republic), and frivaldskyanus Breuning, 1933 occurring in the Banat Region (Romania, Serbia). Many authors (Freude 1976; Turin et al. 2003) question the subspecies rank of both forementioned taxa.

== Nature conservation status ==
In the EU it is listed in the Habitats Directive and it is a characteristic species of the Pannonian biogeographic region. In its whole distribution area Carabus hungaricus is endangered, in some countries almost extinct or critically endangered (Austria, Müller-Motzfeld 2004; Moldova, Neculiseanu et al. 1999 : critically endangered). The populations in Czech Republic and Slovakia are local (Turin et al. 2003). In Hungary Carabus hungaricus can be found in many places, but the habitat of this species is extremely fragmented. The further fragmentation of its habitat would cause a decrease in C. hungaricus population size. Carabus hungaricus is listed in the Red Data Book of the Russian Federation (Ivanenko 1999) and in the Ukrainian Red Book (Serbaka 1994).

== Literature ==
- Bérces, S., Szél, Gy., Ködöböcz, V., Kutasi, Cs., Szabó, K., Fülöp, D., Pénzes, Zs. & Peregovits, L. 2007: A magyar futrinka. [Carabus hungaricus.] – In: Forró, L. (ed.): A Kárpát-medence állatvilágának kialakulása. [The origin of the fauna of the Carpathian Basin.] Magyar Természettudományi Múzeum, Budapest, pp. 107–124.
- Bérces, S., Szél, Gy., Ködöböcz, V. 2007: A magyar futrinka (Carabus hungaricus) elterjedése és természetvédelmi helyzete. (The distribution and nature protection status of the species Carabus hungaricus.) – Természetvédelmi Közlemények 13: 411–420.
- Bérces, S., Szél, Gy., Ködöböcz, V. & Kutasi, Cs. 2008: The distribution, habitat types and nature conservation value of a Natura 2000 beetle, Carabus hungaricus Fabricius, 1792 in Hungary. – In: Penev, L., Erwin, T. & Assmann, T. (eds): Back to the roots and back to the future. Towards a New Synthesis between Taxonomic, Ecological and Biogeographical Approaches in Carabidology. Proceedings of the XIII European Carabidologists Meeting, Blagoevgrad, August 20–24, 2007. Pensoft Series Faunistica No. 75.
- Breuning, S. 1933: Monographie der Gattung Carabus L. (IV. Teil). Bestimmungs-Tabellen der europäischen Coleopteren (Troppau) 106. Heft pp. 705–704.
- Cziki, E. 1905-08: Magyarország bogárfaunája 1. kötet Adephaga 1. Caraboidea.[The beetle fauna of Hungary 1. volume Adephaga 1. Caraboidea.], Budapest.
- Frivaldsky, I. 1865: Jellemző adatok Magyarország faunájához. [Typical faunistic data for Hungary] A Magyar Tudományos Akadémia Évkönyvei 11 (4): 1-275, 13 pls.
- Frivaldsky, J. 1874: Magyarország téhelyröpűinek futonczféléi. [Hungarian ground beetles] (Carabidae) F. Eggenberger Magyar Akadémiai Könyvárusnál, Budapest.
- Kaszab, Z. & Székessy, V. 1953: Bátorliget bogár-faunája, Coleoptera. – In: Bátorliget élővilága [The beetle fauna of Bátorliget – In: The flora and fauna of Bátorliget] (Székessy, V. ed.). Akadémiai Kiadó, Budapest, pp. 194–285.
- Kempelen, R. 1868. III. Heves és külső Szolnok törvényesen egyesült vármegyék állattani leírása. – In: Heves- és Külső Szolnok törvényesen egyesült vármegyék leírása [Faunistic description of the counties Heves and Szolnok in: The description he counties Heves and Szolnok] (Albert, F. ed.): A Magyar Orvosok és Természetvizsgálók XIII. nagygyűlése [Congress of the Hungarian doctors and naturalists], Eger, pp. 175–226.
- Koy T. 1800: Alphabetisches Verzeichniss meiner Insecten-Sammlung. Gewidmet Seinen Entomologischen Freuden von Tobias Koy. Ofen, 64 pp.
- Kutasi, Cs. 1998: Futóbogarak (Coleoptera, Carabidae) Litér környékéről. (Ground beetles (Coleoptera: Carabidae) of the environment of Litér (West Hungary).– Folia Musei Historico-Naturalis Bakonyiensis 13 (1994): 73-87.
- Kutasi, Cs. & Szél, GyY. 2006: Ground beetle assemblages of dolomitic grasslands in Hungary. – Entomologica Fennica 17: 253-257.
- Kuthy, D. 1896 [1897]: Coleoptera. – In: A Magyar Hungariae). [Fauna of the Hungarian Empire.] Társulat, Budapest, pp. 1–213.
- Lie, P. 1994: Neue Beiträge zur Kenntniss der Carabofauna des Rumänischen Banates fur das Jahr 1993 (Coleoptera, Carabidae). – Folia Entomologica Hungarica, Budapest, Rovartani Közlemények, LV. 225-232.
- Lie, P. 1995: Beiträge zur Kenntnis des Carabus hungaricus frivaldskyanus Breuning neuentdeckt im Banat, Rumanien (Coleoptera, Carbidae). -Folia Entomologica Hungarica, Budapest, Rovartani Közlemények, LVI. 85-88.
- Merkl O. 1991: Reassessment of the beetle fauna of Bátorliget, NE Hungary (Coleoptera). – In: The Bátorliget Nature Reserves - after forty years, I. (Mahunka, S. ed.). Akadémiai Kiadó, Budapest, pp. 381–498.
- Szėl, Gy., Bėrces, S., Kutaki, Cs. & Ködöböcz, V. 2006: A magyar futrinka (Carabus hungaricus Fabricius, 1792) hazai elterjedése és élőhelyei (Coleoptera: Carabidae). (Distribution and habitats of Carabus hungaricus Fabricius, 1792 in Hungary (Coleoptera: Carabidae.) – Praenorica. Folia historico-naturalia 9: 45–80.
- Szėl GY., Retezár I., Bėrces S., Fülöp D. És Pénzes Zx. 2007: A magyarországi nagy testű futrinkák (Carabus-fajok). – In: Forró, L. (ed.): A Kárpát-medence állatvilágának kialakulása. [The origin of the fauna of the Carpathian Basin.] Magyar Természettudományi Múzeum, Budapest, p. 87 p. 102
- Turin, H., Penev, L., Casale A. (Eds). 2003: The Genus Carabus L. in Europe. A synthesis. Fauna Europaea Evertebrata No 2.
- Бригадиренко В. В., Федорченко Д. О. Морфологічна мінливість популяції Carabus hungaricus scythus (Coleoptera, Carabidae) в умовах острова Хортиця // Вісник Дніпропетровського університету. Біологія. Екологія. – 2008. – Вип. 16, т. 1. – С. 20–27. (V. V. Brygadyrenko, D. О. Fedorchenko Morphological variability of populations Carabus hungaricus scythus (Coleoptera, Carabidae) on the Khortitsa island (Zaporizhzhya province) // Visnyk of Dnipropetrovsk University. Biology. Ecology. – 2008. – Vol. 16, N 1. – P. 20–27.)
- Data related to Carabus hungaricus at Wikispecies
- Media related to Carabus hungaricus at Wikimedia Commons
