= Rosalia houlberti =

Scientific classification
- Domain: Eukaryota
- Kingdom: Animalia
- Phylum: Arthropoda
- Class: Insecta
- Order: Coleoptera
- Suborder: Polyphaga
- Infraorder: Cucujiformia
- Family: Cerambycidae
- Genus: Rosalia
- Species: R. houlberti

Binomial name
- Rosalia houlberti Vuillet, 1911

Species of beetle

Rosalia houlberti is a species of beetle in the family Cerambycidae. It was described by Vuillet in 1911.
