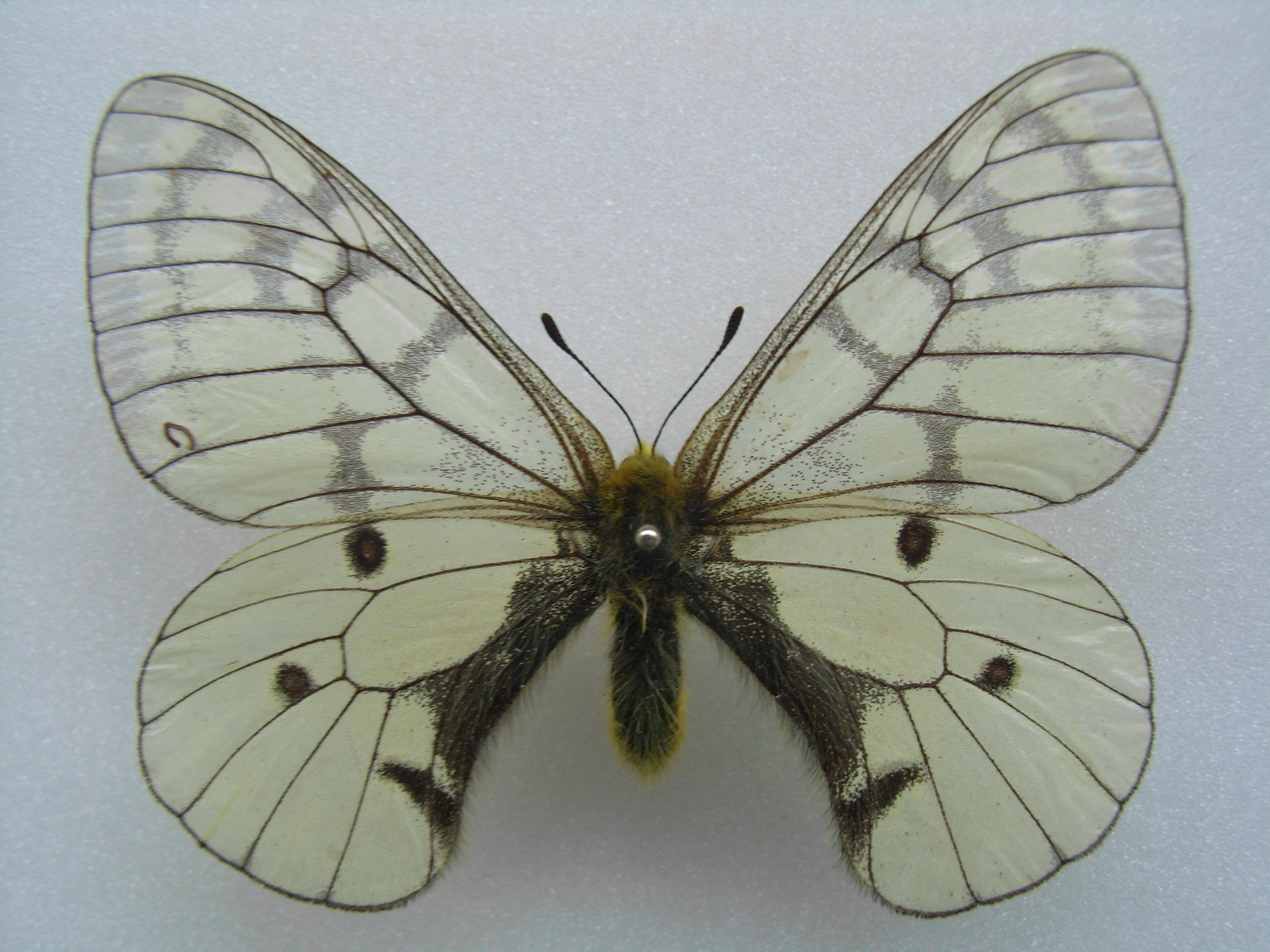

Scientific classification
- Domain: Eukaryota
- Kingdom: Animalia
- Phylum: Arthropoda
- Class: Insecta
- Order: Lepidoptera
- Family: Papilionidae
- Genus: Parnassius
- Species: P. felderi

Binomial name
- Parnassius felderi Bremer, 1861

= Parnassius felderi =

Felder's Apollo

Species of butterfly

Parnassius felderi, the Felder's Apollo, is a high-altitude butterfly which is found in Amur, Ussuri and China, North Korea and Japan. It is a member of the snow Apollo genus (Parnassius) of the swallowtail family, (Papilionidae).

P. felderi is considered conspecific with Parnassius eversmanni by most authors but a good (real/separate) species by Weiss (1999).

== Description ==
Note: The wing pattern in Parnassius species is inconsistent and the very many subspecies and forms make identification problematic and uncertain. Structural characters derived from the genitalia, wing venation, sphragis and foretibial epiphysis are more, but not entirely reliable. The description given here is a guide only. For an identification key see Ackery P.R. (1975).

Opaque white, with a very faint yellowish tint; fringes black or whitish, a thin marginal line being black. Forewing dusted with black on the veins, at the base and at the costal margin, bearing the usual spots; distal margin narrowly vitreous, this band usually extended only as far as three-fourths of edge. Hindwing with two black spots, the upper bearing often, the posterior more rarely, a red central dot; the posterior spot sometimes altogether wanting or only indicated by a dot; in the abdominal area usually a black band-like spot, and beyond the cell along the edge of the wing black dusting. The female more sharply and extendedly marked with grey; the forewing bearing beyond the cell a more or less complete median band, which is however sometimes indicated also in the male, and a submarginal band which is more sharply defined than in the male being, moreover, separated from the vitreous edge only by a row of white halfmoons. Hindwing of female more extendedly blackish; the eyespots mostly without red pupil, sometimes however also the anal ocellus bearing a red spot; near the distal margin a distinct blackish and somewhat undulate band, which is occasionally vestigial in the male. Often both wings more or less densely dusted with black. Strongly melanistic specimens are ab. atrata Graes. The underside of felderi with greasy lustre; the ocelli of the hindwing as a rule filled in with red and white; three red basal spots, more or less dusted with white. Frons, collar, and abdomen yellow-haired, antenna and legs black. Pouch of female brownish, flat trough-shaped, occupying almost half the length of the abdomen.

== Subspecies ==
- P. f. felderi Bureya Range
- P. f. litoreus Stichel, 1907 south Amur
- P. f. maui Sheljuzhko, 1914 Sikhote-Alin Mountains
