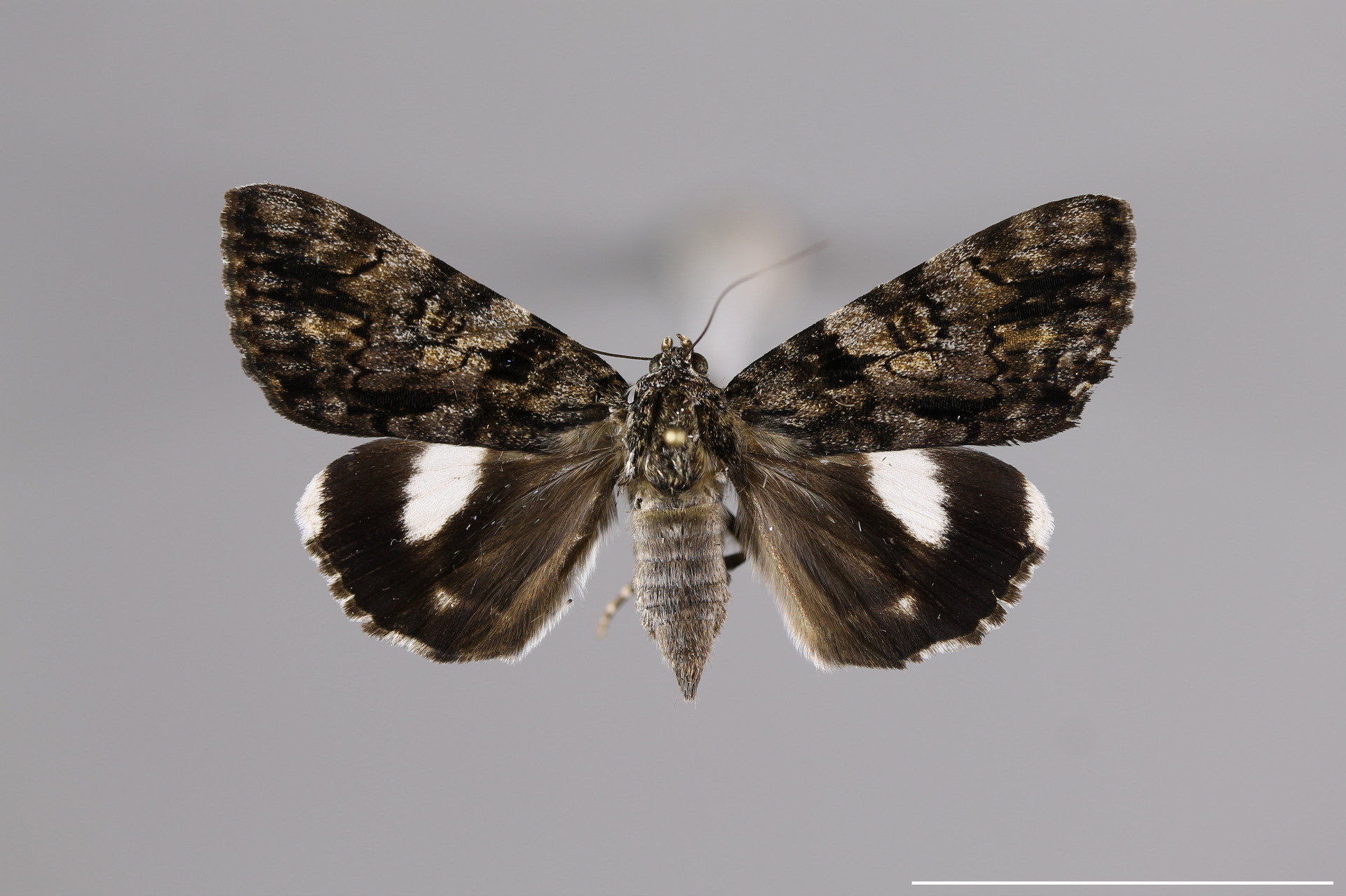
- Illustration

Scientific classification
- Kingdom: Animalia
- Phylum: Arthropoda
- Class: Insecta
- Order: Lepidoptera
- Superfamily: Noctuoidea
- Family: Erebidae
- Genus: Catocala
- Species: C. nagioides

Binomial name
- Catocala nagioides (Wileman, 1924)

Synonyms
- Ephesia nagioides Wileman, 1924; Ephesia sancta; Catocala sancta Butler, 1885 (preocc. Hulst, 1884)

= Catocala nagioides =

Species of moth

Catocala nagioides is a moth of the family Erebidae. It is found in Japan and eastern Russia.

The wingspan is about 25 mm (0.98 inches).
