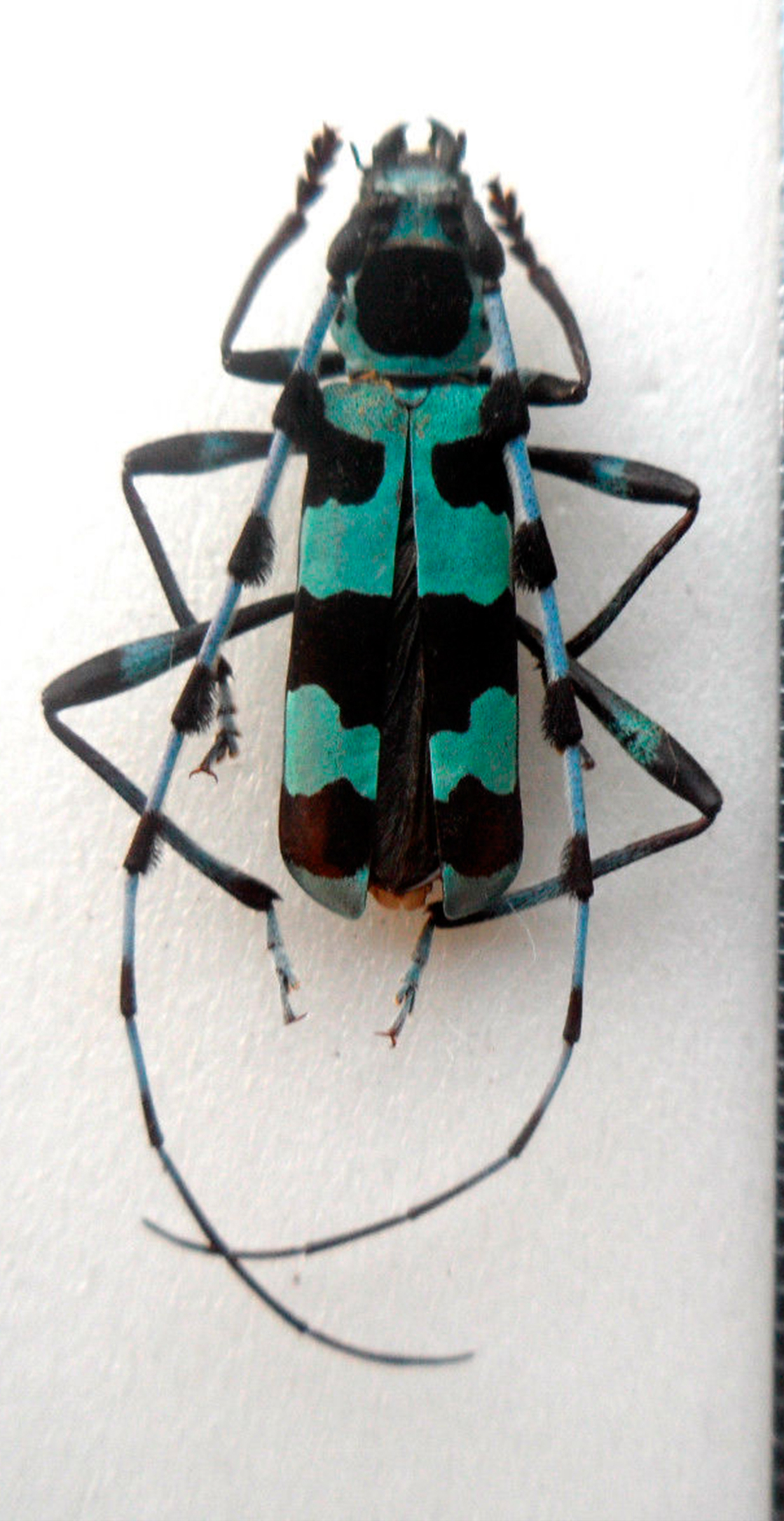
- female

Scientific classification
- Domain: Eukaryota
- Kingdom: Animalia
- Phylum: Arthropoda
- Class: Insecta
- Order: Coleoptera
- Suborder: Polyphaga
- Infraorder: Cucujiformia
- Family: Cerambycidae
- Genus: Rosalia
- Species: R. coelestis

Binomial name
- Rosalia coelestis Semenov, 1911

= Rosalia coelestis =

Species of beetle

Rosalia coelestis is a species of beetle in the family Cerambycidae. It was described by Semenov in 1911.
