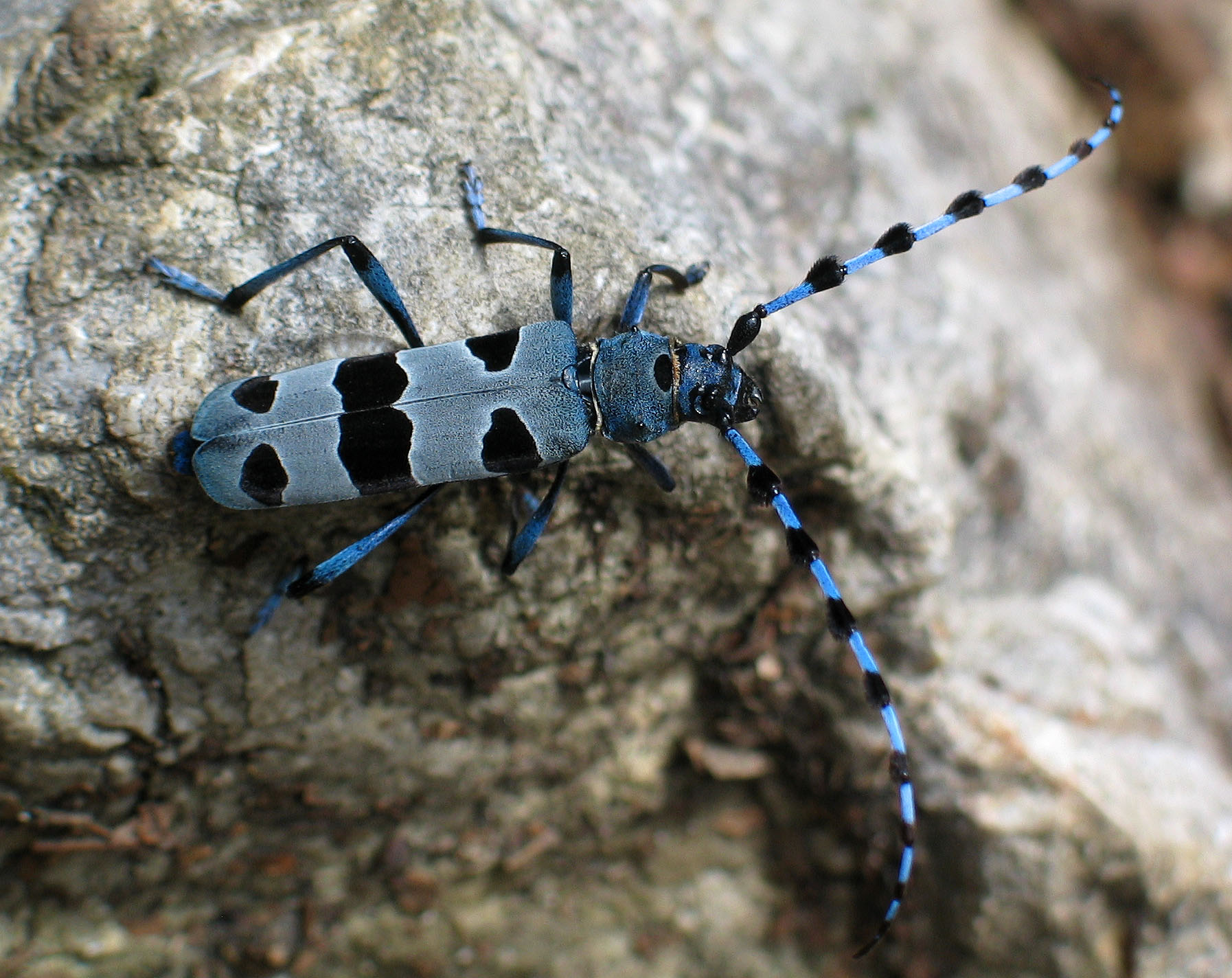

Conservation status
- Vulnerable (IUCN 2.3)

Scientific classification
- Kingdom: Animalia
- Phylum: Arthropoda
- Clade: Pancrustacea
- Class: Insecta
- Order: Coleoptera
- Suborder: Polyphaga
- Infraorder: Cucujiformia
- Family: Cerambycidae
- Genus: Rosalia
- Species: R. alpina

Binomial name
- Rosalia alpina (Linnaeus, 1758)

= Rosalia longicorn =

Species of beetle

The rosalia longicorn (Rosalia alpina) or alpine longhorn beetle is a large longicorn (family Cerambycidae) that is distinguished by its distinctive markings. The beetle lives in beech forests with sun exposure and clearings. It is a captivating and endangered species that graces the Euro-Caucasian region with its presence and lay eggs on stacked timber especially often in beech wood storage.

== Classification ==
The species was first described as Cerambyx alpinus by Carl Linnaeus in his 1758 work Fauna Svecica. The description was written based on a specimen collected more than fifty years earlier by another scientist in the Swiss Alps. Linnaeus wrote that it was found in Scania and Blekinge.

== Description ==
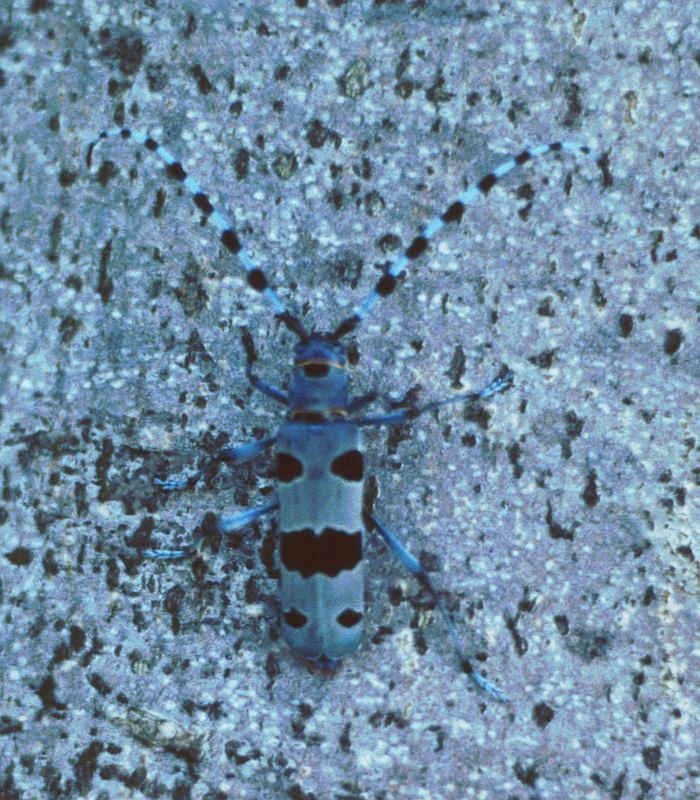
Rosalia longicorn in camouflage against a beech.

The rosalia longicorn is 15 to 38 mm (0.59 to 1.50 in) long. The antennae can be up to twice as long as the rest of the body in males, and the same length in females. The elytra are flat, blue-gray, with variable black spots, including a prominent one on the thorax, a silky one in front, and a small one in back. Both the antennae and the legs have the same coloration as the body. The coloration serves as good camouflage with their preferred habitat, the European beech.

They are distributed from Cantabrian Mountains east to Caucasus. Its numbers across Europe has greatly depleted in recent years, and it is a protected species in Germany, Hungary, Italy, Poland, Serbia, and Slovakia. Rosalia longicorn is depicted in the logo of Danube-Ipoly National Park in Hungary.

The adults are active from June to September. By day the beetles sit near flowers and feed on the pollen. They are able to make a chirping sound by scraping their rear legs and elytra together. After mating, the female lays the eggs within a crack in the bark of beech trees. The larva eats the bark and pupates there as well when it has reached about three years of age. The mature adult emerges from the pupa and then have a further lifespan of three to six weeks.
