= August Morawitz =

Russian entomologist (1837–1897)

- Август Моравиц
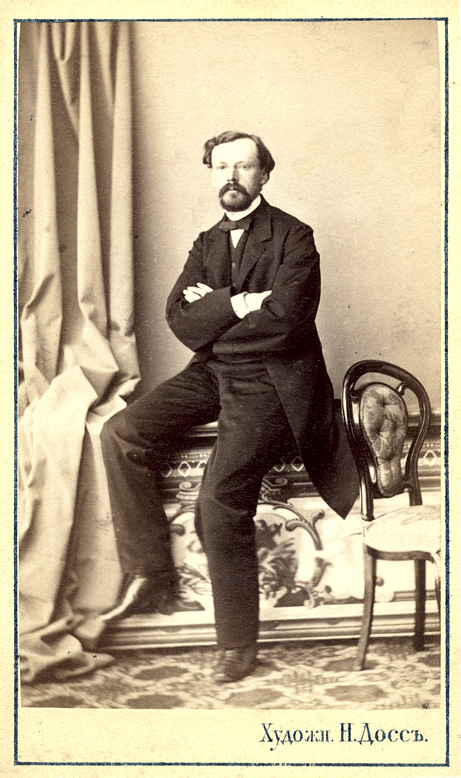
- Born: 22 August 1837; St. Petersburg, Russia
- Died: 16 September 1897 (aged 60); Blankenburg, Germany
- Scientific career
- Fields: Entomology
- Institutions: Zoological Museum of the Russian Academy of Science

August Feodorovich Morawitz (Russian: Август Фёдорович Моравиц, romanized: Avgust Fyodorovich Moravits; 22 August 1837 – 16 September 1897) was a Russian entomologist interested in Coleoptera.

== Education and family ==
Morawitz' parents were Ferdinand Joseph Kaspar Morawitz, a wealthy industrialist and wagon builder, and Amalie Friederike Widemann.

He grew up in St. Petersburg and visited the German school Annenschule. From 1855 to 1859, he studied medicine and zoology in Dorpat, Würzburg and Berlin.

On 27 May 1876, he married Charlotte Bergholz, a pharmacy owner's daughter; they had five children:

1. Rudolf Morawitz (25 May 1877, St. Petersburg – 23 June 1951, Braunschweig), a judge who retired early because of his "non-aryan blood";
2. Paul Oskar Morawitz (3 April 1879 – 1936), a well known internist and physiologist;
3. Charlotte Morawitz (30 March 1881 – 8 October 1945, Marburg);
4. Hugo Paul Alexander Morawitz (11 October 1882, St. Petersburg);
5. Alice Morawitz (1884–1966).

== Career ==
He became Curator of the insect collections at the Zoological Museum of the Russian Academy of Science when Édouard Ménétries retired from that post. He wrote (1862). Vorläufige Diagnosen neuer Coleopteren aus Südost-Sibirien. Bulletin de l'Académie Impériale des Sciences, St. Petersburg, 5: 231-265. August Feodorovitsh Morawitz is not to be confused with his brother Ferdinand Ferdinandovitsch Morawitz (1827–1896), another St. Petersburg prominent entomologist associated with the Zoological Museum of the Russian Academy of Science.

== Sources ==
- Baker, D. B., 2004 Type material of Hymenoptera described by O. L. Radoszkowsky in the Natural History Museum, London, and the localities of A. P. Fedtschencko's Reise in Turkestan Dt. ent. Zeitschr. 51, 231-252.
