= Carabus elysii pulcher =

Scientific classification
- Kingdom: Animalia
- Phylum: Arthropoda
- Class: Insecta
- Order: Coleoptera
- Suborder: Adephaga
- Family: Carabidae
- Genus: Carabus
- Species: C. elysii
- Subspecies: C. e. pulcher

Trinomial name
- Carabus elysii pulcher Kleinfeld, 1997

Subspecies of beetle

Carabus elysii pulcher is a subspecies of ground beetle in the subfamily Carabinae that is endemic to Henan, China. The subspecies are black coloured with bronze pronotum.
