= Carabus elysii elysii =

Scientific classification
- Kingdom: Animalia
- Phylum: Arthropoda
- Class: Insecta
- Order: Coleoptera
- Suborder: Adephaga
- Family: Carabidae
- Genus: Carabus
- Species: C. elysii
- Subspecies: C. e. elysii

Trinomial name
- Carabus elysii elysii Thomson, 1856

Synonyms
- Carabus rothschildi Born, 1889; Carabus rutishauseri Hauser, 1912 "Hubei"; Carabus hunanensis Born, 1910 "Hunan"; Carabus smaragdinus Hauser, 1921, nec Duftschmid, 1812; Carabus idai Kleinfeld, 2000

Subspecies of beetle

Carabus elysii elysii is a subspecies of ground beetle in the Carabinae subfamily that is endemic to China. They could be found in the cities like Anhui, Hubei, Hunan, and Sichuan. The subspecies are black coloured with either brown or pink pronotum.
