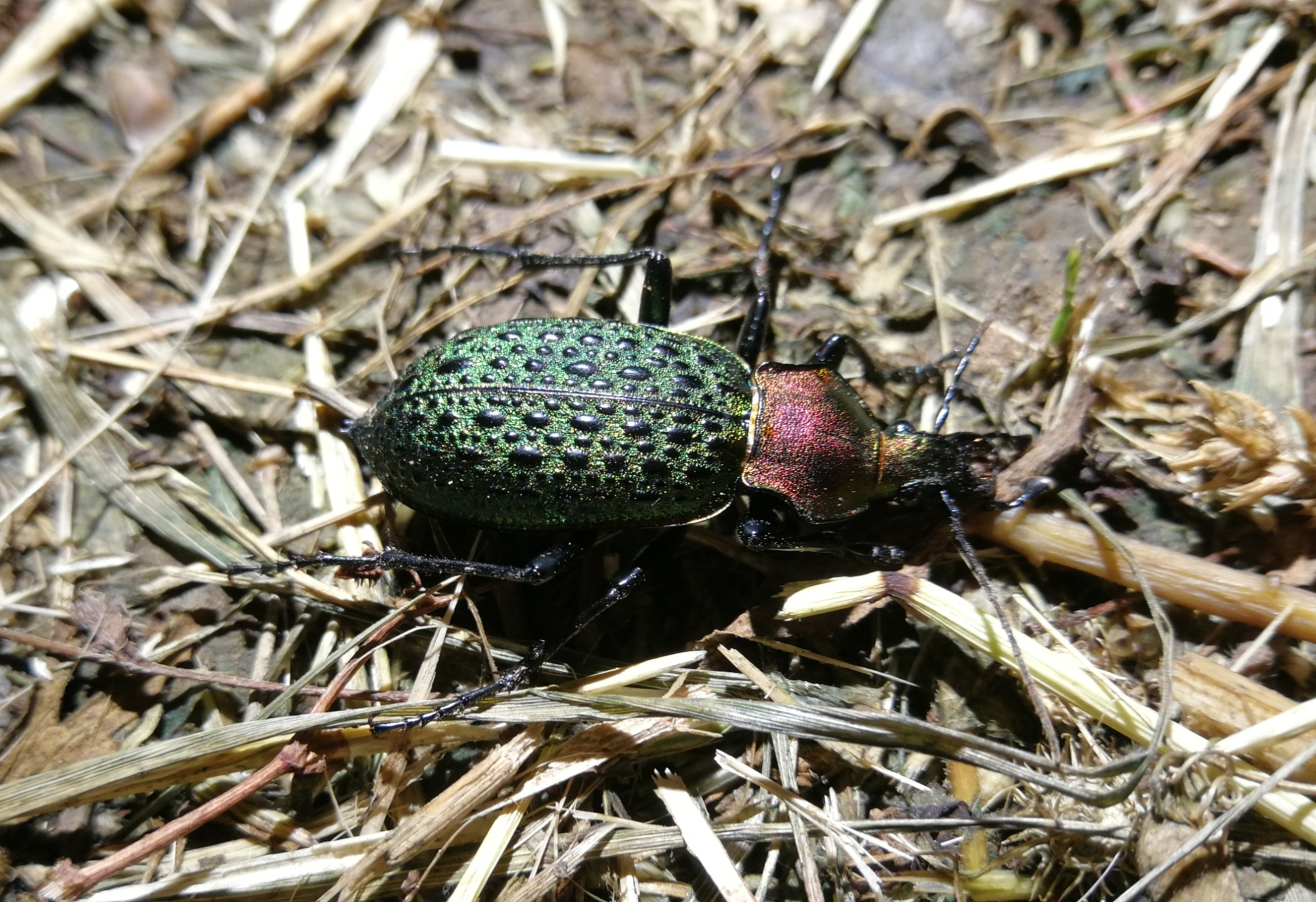

Scientific classification
- Kingdom: Animalia
- Phylum: Arthropoda
- Class: Insecta
- Order: Coleoptera
- Suborder: Adephaga
- Family: Carabidae
- Genus: Carabus
- Species: C. elysii

Binomial name
- Carabus elysii Thomson, 1856

= Carabus elysii =

Species of beetle

Carabus elysii is a species of ground beetle in the Carabinae subfamily that is endemic to China. The species have black back and dark reddish pronotum.

Subspecies include:

- Carabus elysii elysii
- Carabus elysii magnificens
- Carabus elysii pulcher
