= Carabus elysii magnificens =

Scientific classification
- Kingdom: Animalia
- Phylum: Arthropoda
- Class: Insecta
- Order: Coleoptera
- Suborder: Adephaga
- Family: Carabidae
- Genus: Carabus
- Species: C. elysii
- Subspecies: C. e. magnificens

Trinomial name
- Carabus elysii magnificens Kleinfeld, 1999

Subspecies of beetle

Carabus elysii magnificens is a subspecies of ground beetle in the subfamily Carabinae that is endemic to Henan, China. The subspecies are black coloured with either golden or bronze pronotum.
