= Carabus maurus osculatii =

Scientific classification
- Domain: Eukaryota
- Kingdom: Animalia
- Phylum: Arthropoda
- Class: Insecta
- Order: Coleoptera
- Suborder: Adephaga
- Family: Carabidae
- Genus: Carabus
- Species: C. maurus
- Subspecies: C. m. osculatii

Trinomial name
- Carabus maurus osculatii Osculati, 1844

Subspecies of beetle

Carabus maurus osculatii is a subspecies of beetle from family Carabidae, that is endemic to Iran. The species are steel coloured, and are named after its discoverer Gaetano Osculati.
