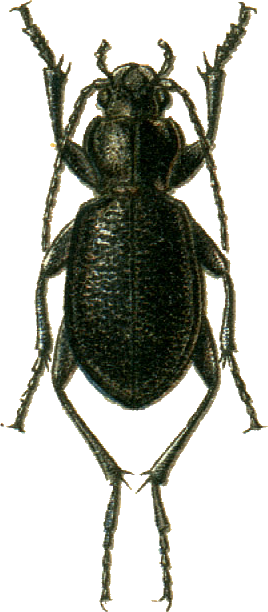

Scientific classification
- Domain: Eukaryota
- Kingdom: Animalia
- Phylum: Arthropoda
- Class: Insecta
- Order: Coleoptera
- Suborder: Adephaga
- Family: Carabidae
- Genus: Carabus
- Species: C. maurus

Binomial name
- Carabus maurus (Adams, 1817)

= Carabus maurus =

Species of beetle

Carabus maurus is a species of beetle from the family Carabidae, found in Near East, and countries like Armenia, Georgia, Iran, Iraq, Israel, Lebanon, Syria, Turkey, Turkmenistan, and on Cyprus. The species are either black or steal coloured.

Subspecies include:

- Carabus maurus maurus
- Carabus maurus osculatii
