= Carabus maurus maurus =

Scientific classification
- Domain: Eukaryota
- Kingdom: Animalia
- Phylum: Arthropoda
- Class: Insecta
- Order: Coleoptera
- Suborder: Adephaga
- Family: Carabidae
- Genus: Carabus
- Species: C. maurus
- Subspecies: C. m. maurus

Trinomial name
- Carabus maurus maurus (Adams, 1817)

Synonyms
- Carabus gemellus Fischer, 1844 "Caucasus"; Carabus discoideus Reitter, 1880; Carabus alagoensis Kraatz, 1896; Carabus maurulus Mandl, 1955 "Caucasus"

Subspecies of beetle

Carabus maurus maurus is a subspecies of beetle from the family Carabidae, found in Armenia, Georgia, and Turkey. The species are black coloured.
