= Gaetano Osculati =

Italian naturalist

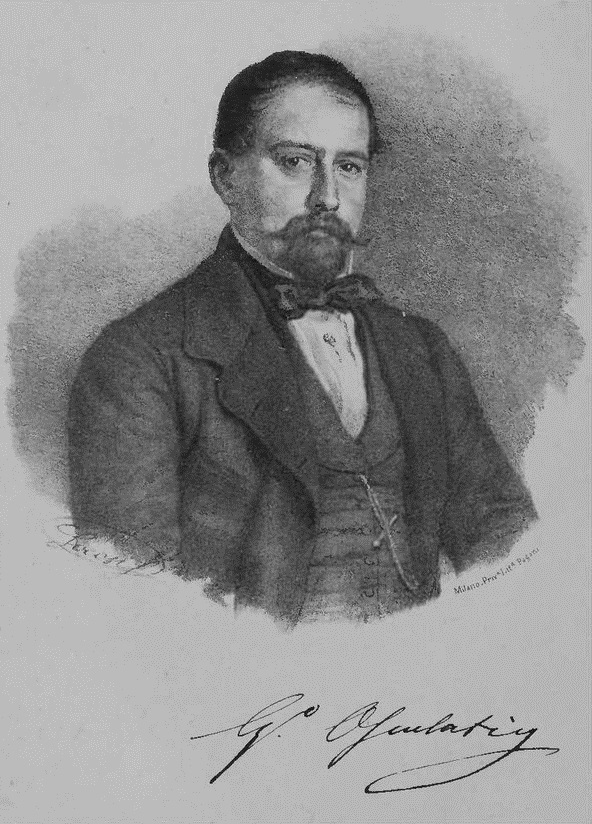
Gaetano Osculati

Gaetano Osculati (born in Biassono, Lombardy, 29 November 1808; died in Milan, 14 March 1894) was an Italian naturalist.

== Biography ==
At an early age he devoted himself to the study of the natural sciences, and in 1830/31 he visited Greece, Egypt, Asia Minor, and other provinces of the Ottoman Empire. He embarked for South America in 1834, traversed the greater part of that continent, and in 1836 returned to Europe by the way of Cape Horn.

In 1841 he visited Arabia, Armenia, Persia, and the coast of Malabar, and in 1846 he visited the United States. After passing hurriedly through Canada, the United States, the Antilles, and Venezuela, he went to Quito, and thence started on an expedition to the Napo, a tributary of the Amazon. After several days' march he was abandoned by his native guides, but he succeeded in reaching the Napo alone, after a journey across a wide expanse of unsettled country and through trackless forests. He suffered for food, and during two weeks subsisted on palm leaves and a single kind of fruit. In 1848 he returned to Europe with a rich collection.

He published Esplorazione delle regioni equatoriali lungo il Napo ed il fiume delle Amazzoni. Frammento di un viaggio fatto nelle due Americhe negli anni 1846-47-48 (Milan, 1850 first edition, 1854 second edition).
