= Carabus montivagus montivagus =

Scientific classification
- Domain: Eukaryota
- Kingdom: Animalia
- Phylum: Arthropoda
- Class: Insecta
- Order: Coleoptera
- Suborder: Adephaga
- Family: Carabidae
- Genus: Carabus
- Species: C. montivagus
- Subspecies: C. m. montivagus

Trinomial name
- Carabus montivagus montivagus Palliardi, 1825

Subspecies of beetle

Carabus montivagus montivagus is a subspecies of beetle from family Carabidae, found in Bulgaria, Greece, Hungary, Italy, North Macedonia, Romania, Slovakia, Yugoslavia, and European part of Turkey.
