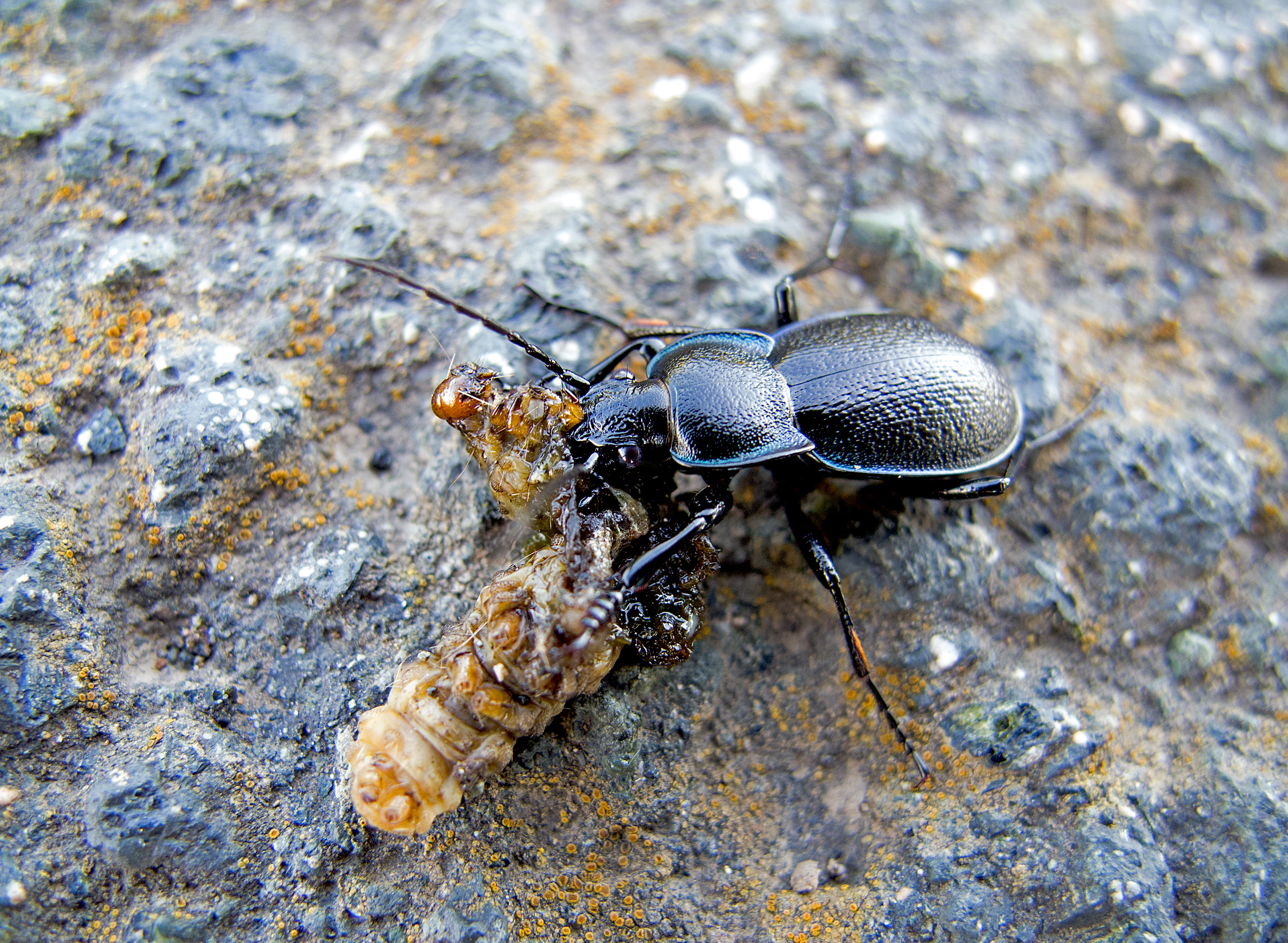

Scientific classification
- Domain: Eukaryota
- Kingdom: Animalia
- Phylum: Arthropoda
- Class: Insecta
- Order: Coleoptera
- Suborder: Adephaga
- Family: Carabidae
- Genus: Carabus
- Species: C. montivagus

Binomial name
- Carabus montivagus Palliardi, 1825

Synonyms
- Archicarabus montivagus; Carabus bulgaricus Csiki, 1927; Carabus kalofirensis Apfelbeck, 1904; Carabus ponticus Apfelbeck, 1904; Carabus rosalitanus Apfelbeck, 1904

= Carabus montivagus =

Species of beetle

Carabus montivagus is a species of black coloured beetle from family Carabidae, found in Albania, Bulgaria, Greece, Hungary, Italy, Romania, Slovakia, and all of the republics of the former Yugoslavia.

There is a subspecies: Carabus montivagus montivagus.
