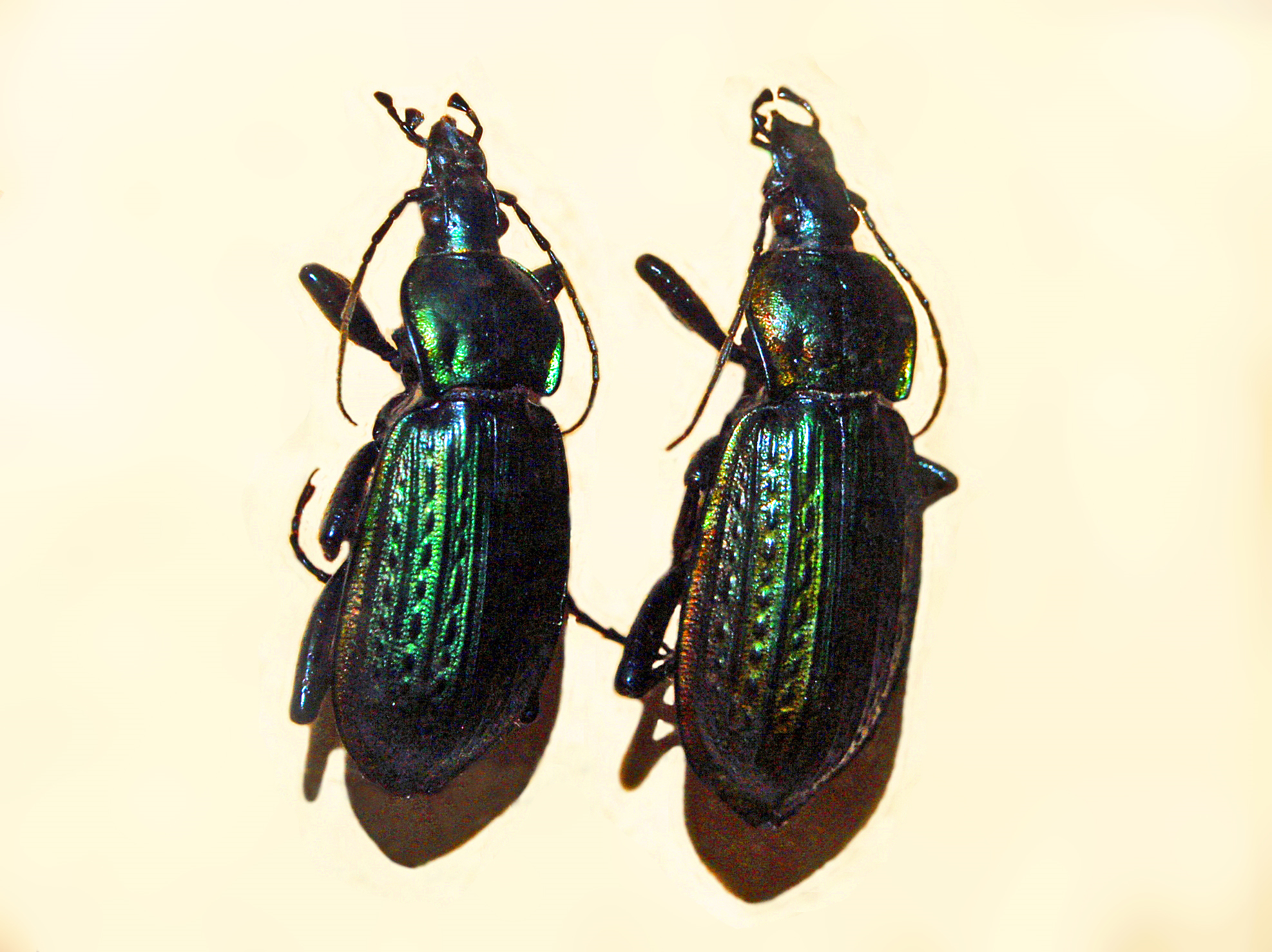
- Carabus morbillosus from Tunisia. Male and female

Scientific classification
- Kingdom: Animalia
- Phylum: Arthropoda
- Clade: Pancrustacea
- Class: Insecta
- Order: Coleoptera
- Suborder: Adephaga
- Family: Carabidae
- Genus: Carabus
- Species: C. morbillosus

Binomial name
- Carabus morbillosus Fabricius 1792

Synonyms
- Carabus (Macrothorax) morbillosus Fabricius 1792

= Carabus morbillosus =

Species of beetle

Carabus morbillosus is a beetle of the family Carabidae.

== Description ==
Carabus morbillosus reaches about 30 millimetres (1.2 in) in length. These beetles usually have a bright metallic bronze green or purple sometimes even blue coloration. They feed on snails and small insects.

== Distribution ==
This species occurs in France, Italy, Malta, Spain and in North Africa (Algeria, Libya, Morocco, Tunisia).

== Subspecies ==
- Carabus morbillosus alternans Palliardi, 1825
- Carabus morbillosus constantinus Kraatz, 1899
- Carabus morbillosus cychrisans Lapouge, 1899
- Carabus morbillosus macilentus Vacher de Lapouge, 1899
- Carabus morbillosus maroccanus Bedel, 1895
- Carabus morbillosus morbillosus Fabricius, 1792
