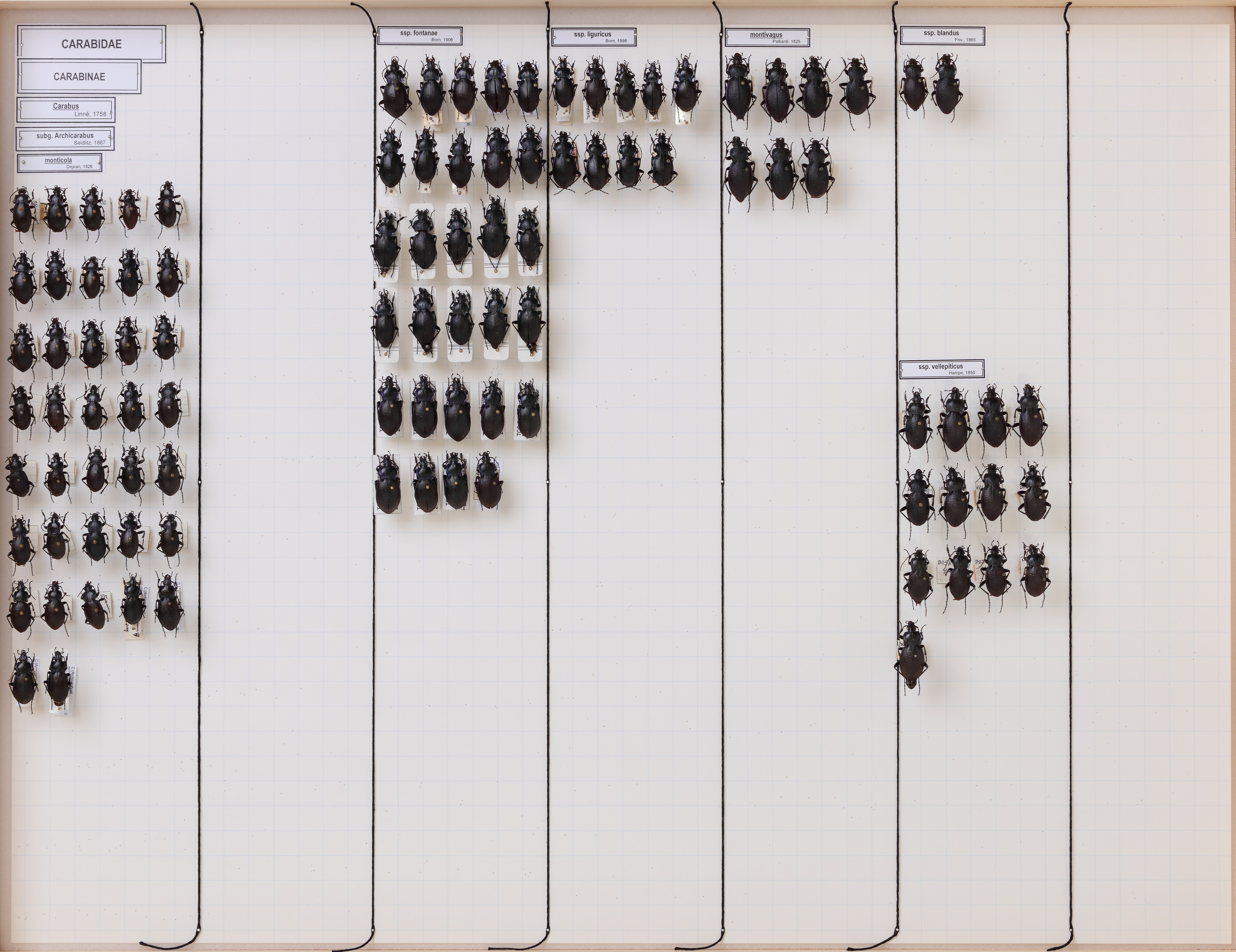
- Carabus montivagus and Carabus monticola 1 of 6000 insect drawers at the Natural History Museum Bern (NMBE)

Scientific classification
- Kingdom: Animalia
- Phylum: Arthropoda
- Class: Insecta
- Order: Coleoptera
- Suborder: Adephaga
- Family: Carabidae
- Genus: Carabus
- Species: C. monticola

Binomial name
- Carabus monticola Dejean, 1826

= Carabus monticola =

Species of beetle

Carabus monticola is a species of beetle from family Carabidae, found in France, Italy, and Switzerland.
