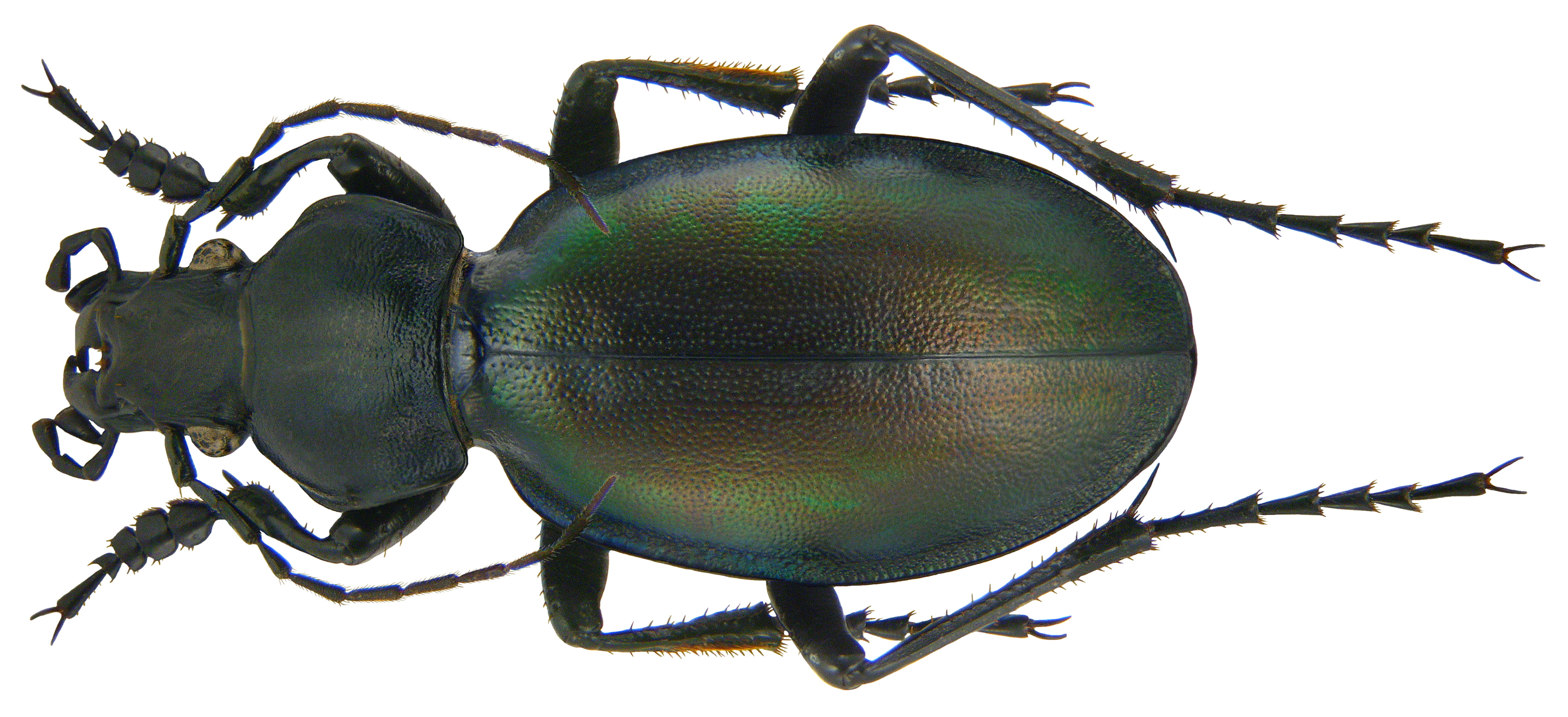

Scientific classification
- Kingdom: Animalia
- Phylum: Arthropoda
- Clade: Pancrustacea
- Class: Insecta
- Order: Coleoptera
- Suborder: Adephaga
- Family: Carabidae
- Genus: Carabus
- Species: C. torosus

Binomial name
- Carabus torosus E. Frivaldsky, 1835

= Carabus torosus =

Species of beetle

Carabus torosus is a species of black-coloured ground beetle in the Carabinae subfamily that can be found in Bulgaria, European part of Turkey, and Near East.

== Subspecies ==
- Carabus torosus rigouti Basquin & Darge, 1986
- Carabus torosus salignus Schweiger, 1969
- Carabus torosus vexator Schweiger, 1969
