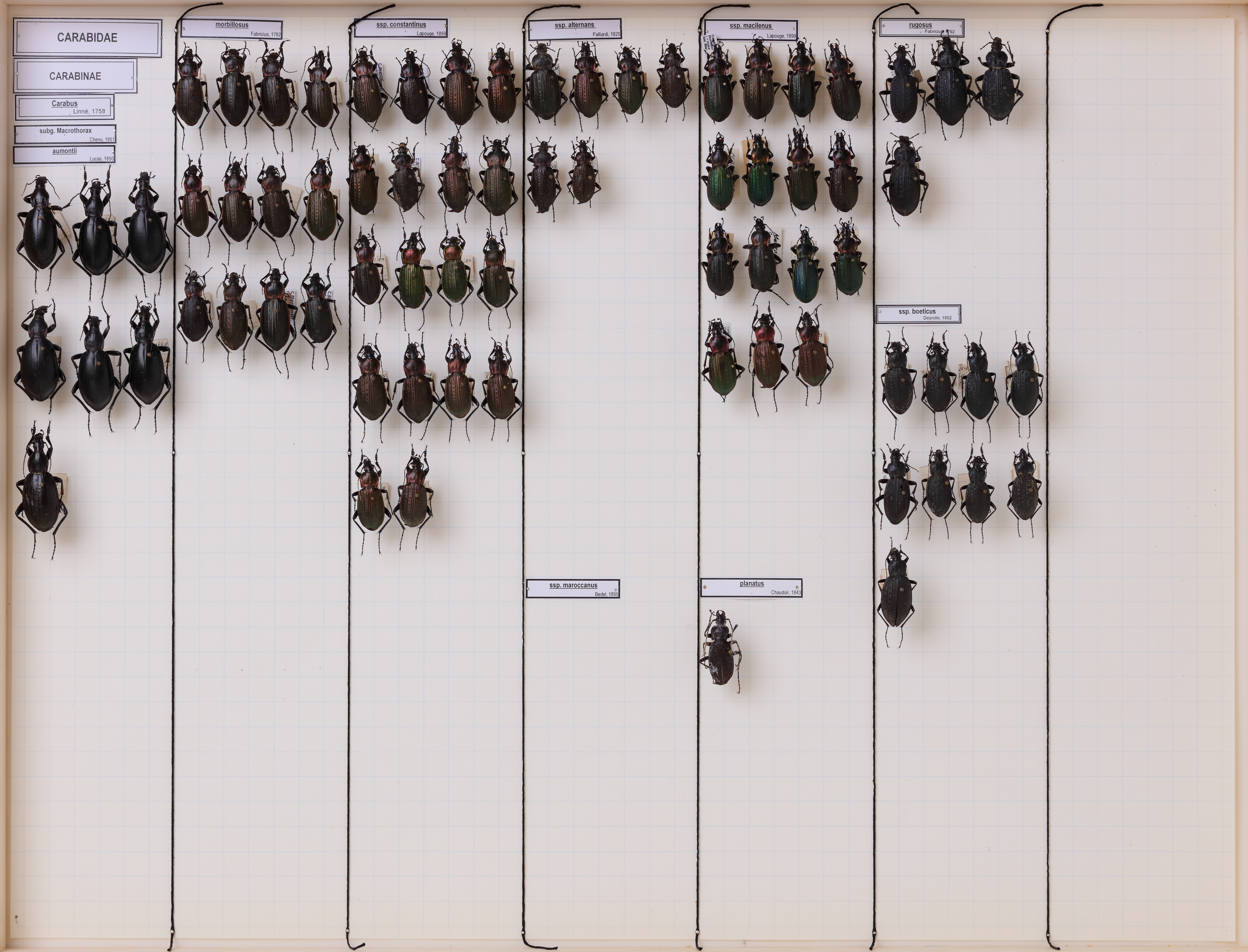

Scientific classification
- Kingdom: Animalia
- Phylum: Arthropoda
- Clade: Pancrustacea
- Class: Insecta
- Order: Coleoptera
- Suborder: Adephaga
- Family: Carabidae
- Genus: Carabus
- Species: C. planatus

Binomial name
- Carabus planatus Chaudoir, 1843

= Carabus planatus =

Species of beetle

Carabus planatus is a species of ground beetle from Carabinae family, that is endemic to Sicily.
