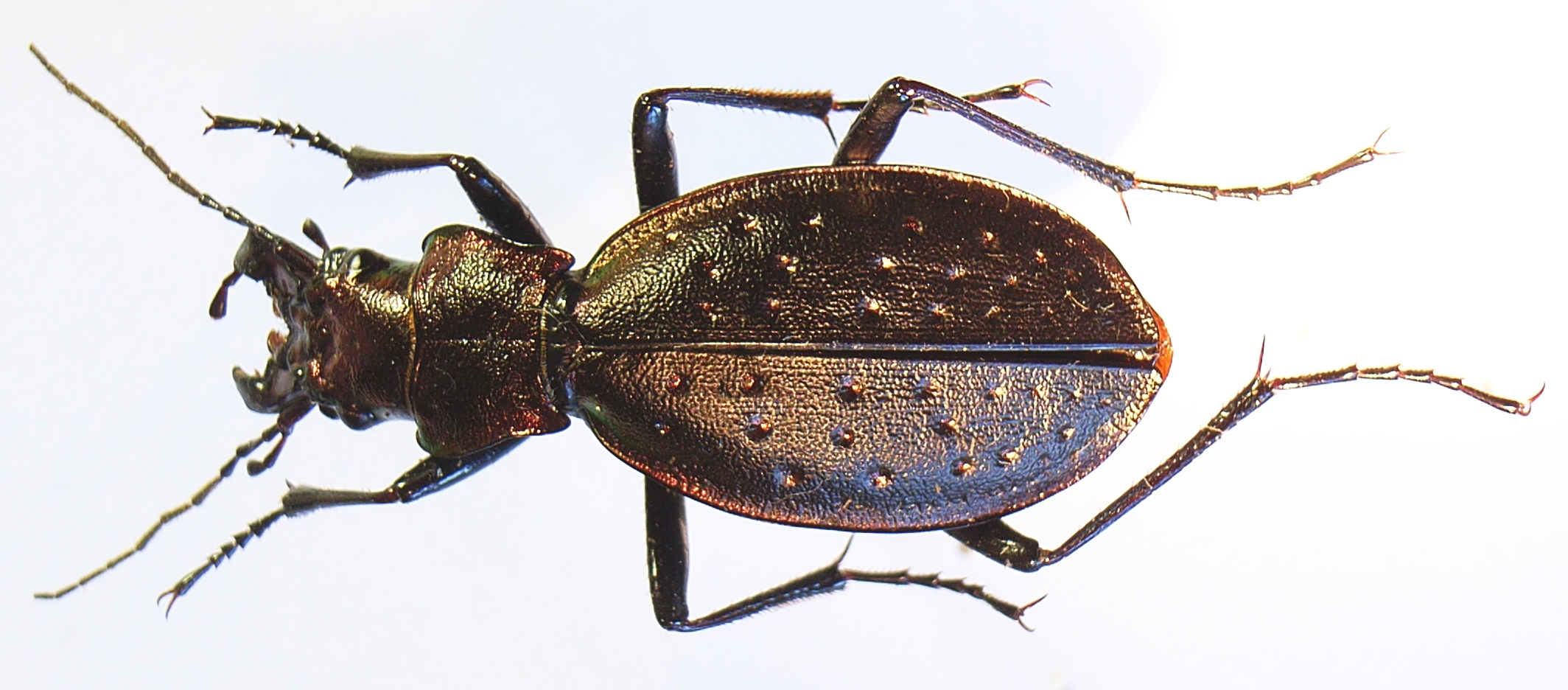

Scientific classification
- Kingdom: Animalia
- Phylum: Arthropoda
- Clade: Pancrustacea
- Class: Insecta
- Order: Coleoptera
- Suborder: Adephaga
- Family: Carabidae
- Genus: Carabus
- Species: C. irregularis

Binomial name
- Carabus irregularis Fabricius, 1792

= Carabus irregularis =

Species of beetle

Carabus irregularis is a species of ground beetle endemic to Central Europe, Belgium, Italy, Luxembourg, Ukraine and all states of former Yugoslavia (except for North Macedonia).
