= Carabus italicus italicus =

Scientific classification
- Kingdom: Animalia
- Phylum: Arthropoda
- Class: Insecta
- Order: Coleoptera
- Suborder: Adephaga
- Family: Carabidae
- Genus: Carabus
- Species: C. italicus
- Subspecies: C. i. italicus

Trinomial name
- Carabus italicus italicus Dejean, 1826

Synonyms
- Carabus halbherri Lapouge, 1898; Carabus ronchettii Born, 1900; Carabus battonianus Mandl, 1966

Subspecies of beetle

Carabus italicus italicus is a black coloured subspecies of beetle from family Carabidae, found in Italy and Switzerland. The subspecies males range from 22–23 millimetres (0.87–0.91 in).
