= Carabus italicus rostagnoi =

Scientific classification
- Kingdom: Animalia
- Phylum: Arthropoda
- Clade: Pancrustacea
- Class: Insecta
- Order: Coleoptera
- Suborder: Adephaga
- Family: Carabidae
- Genus: Carabus
- Species: C. italicus
- Subspecies: C. i. rostagnoi

Trinomial name
- Carabus italicus rostagnoi Luigioni, 1904

Synonyms
- Carabus rostagnonis Seidlitz, 1904

Subspecies of beetle

Carabus italicus rostagnoi is a black coloured subspecies of ground beetle in the subfamily Carabinae, that is endemic to Central Italy.
