= Carabus italicus =

Scientific classification
- Kingdom: Animalia
- Phylum: Arthropoda
- Class: Insecta
- Order: Coleoptera
- Suborder: Adephaga
- Family: Carabidae
- Genus: Carabus
- Species: C. italicus

Binomial name
- Carabus italicus Dejean, 1826

Species of beetle

Carabus italicus is a species of beetle from family Carabidae, found in Italy, Slovenia, and Switzerland. The males could range from 22–23 millimetres (0.87–0.91 in) in length.

== Subspecies ==
The species have only 2 subspecies which could only be found in Italy and Switzerland:

- Carabus italicus italicus Dejean, 1826 Italy, Switzerland
- Carabus italicus rostagnoi Luigioni, 1904 Italy
