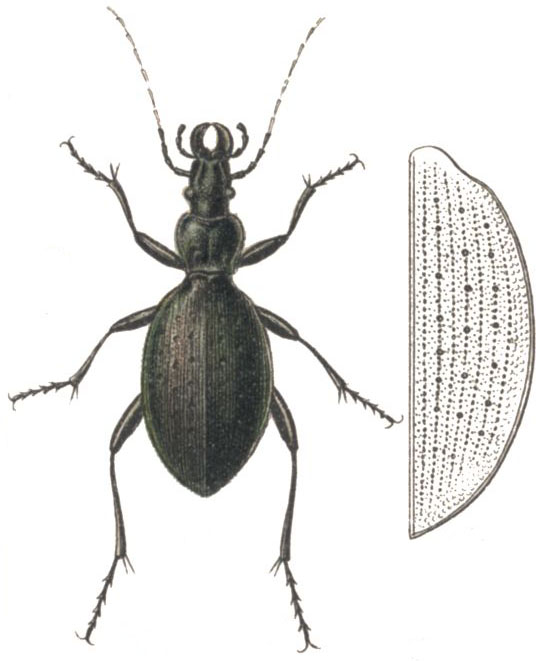

Scientific classification
- Domain: Eukaryota
- Kingdom: Animalia
- Phylum: Arthropoda
- Class: Insecta
- Order: Coleoptera
- Suborder: Adephaga
- Family: Carabidae
- Genus: Carabus
- Species: C. creutzeri

Binomial name
- Carabus creutzeri Fabricius, 1801

= Carabus creutzeri =

Species of beetle

Carabus creutzeri is a species of ground beetle. It is found in Central and Southern Europe: Austria, Switzerland, Slovenia, Croatia, and Italy.
