= Carabus pustulifer =

Scientific classification
- Domain: Eukaryota
- Kingdom: Animalia
- Phylum: Arthropoda
- Class: Insecta
- Order: Coleoptera
- Suborder: Adephaga
- Family: Carabidae
- Genus: Carabus
- Species: C. pustulifer

Binomial name
- Carabus pustulifer H. Lucas, 1869

Species of beetle

Carabus pustulifer is a species of ground beetle from family Carabidae first described by Hippolyte Lucas in 1869. They are black coloured.
