= Megachile australis =

Scientific classification
- Domain: Eukaryota
- Kingdom: Animalia
- Phylum: Arthropoda
- Class: Insecta
- Order: Hymenoptera
- Family: Megachilidae
- Genus: Megachile
- Species: M. australis

Binomial name
- Megachile australis H. Lucas, 1876

Species of leafcutter bee (Megachile)

Megachile australis is a species of bee in the family Megachilidae. It was described by Hippolyte Lucas in 1876.
