= Carabus przewalskii =

Scientific classification
- Domain: Eukaryota
- Kingdom: Animalia
- Phylum: Arthropoda
- Class: Insecta
- Order: Coleoptera
- Suborder: Adephaga
- Family: Carabidae
- Genus: Carabus
- Species: C. przewalskii

Binomial name
- Carabus przewalskii A. Morawitz, 1886

Species of beetle

Carabus przewalskii is a species of ground beetle in the subgenus Calocarabus, within the larger genus Carabus.

It contains twelve accepted subspecies:

- C. przewalskii babao Deuve, 2007
- C. przewalskii elnarae Cavazzuti, 2007
- C. przewalskii janataianus Deuve, 2009
- C. przewalskii lingensis Cavazzuti, 2011
- C. przewalskii maomao Cavazzuti, 2007
- C. przewalskii mayashanus Cavazzuti, 2007
- C. przewalskii nitescens Cavazzuti, 2012
- C. przewalskii przewalskii A. Morawitz, 1886
- C. przewalskii pseudocranioformis Deuve & Tian, 2007
- C. przewalskii seditiosus Cavazzuti & Proscia, 2012
- C. przewalskii sewertzowi Semenov, 1898
- C. przewalskii somoli Deuve, 2007
