= Carabus faminii =

Scientific classification
- Kingdom: Animalia
- Phylum: Arthropoda
- Clade: Pancrustacea
- Class: Insecta
- Order: Coleoptera
- Suborder: Adephaga
- Family: Carabidae
- Genus: Carabus
- Species: C. faminii

Binomial name
- Carabus faminii Dejean, 1826

Species of beetle

Carabus faminii is a species of ground beetle in the Carabinae subfamily, endemic to Sicily.
