= Carabus adelphus =

Scientific classification
- Kingdom: Animalia
- Phylum: Arthropoda
- Class: Insecta
- Order: Coleoptera
- Suborder: Adephaga
- Family: Carabidae
- Genus: Carabus
- Species: C. adelphus

Binomial name
- Carabus adelphus Rost, 1892

Species of beetle

Carabus adelphus is a species of ground beetle in the large genus Carabus.
