= Batocera victoriana =

Scientific classification
- Kingdom: Animalia
- Phylum: Arthropoda
- Clade: Pancrustacea
- Class: Insecta
- Order: Coleoptera
- Suborder: Polyphaga
- Infraorder: Cucujiformia
- Family: Cerambycidae
- Genus: Batocera
- Species: B. victoriana

Binomial name
- Batocera victoriana Thomson, 1856

Species of beetle

Batocera victoriana is a species of beetle in the family Cerambycidae. It was described by Thomson in 1856. It is known from Borneo, India, Laos, the Philippines, Malaysia, Vietnam, and Sumatra. It contains the varietas Batocera victoriana var. velleda.
