= Batocera herbuloti =

Scientific classification
- Kingdom: Animalia
- Phylum: Arthropoda
- Class: Insecta
- Order: Coleoptera
- Suborder: Polyphaga
- Infraorder: Cucujiformia
- Family: Cerambycidae
- Genus: Batocera
- Species: B. herbuloti

Binomial name
- Batocera herbuloti (Devecis, 1993)

Synonyms
- Megacriodes herbuloti Devecis, 1993

Species of beetle

Batocera herbuloti is a species of beetle in the family Cerambycidae. It was described by Devecis in 1993. It is known from Borneo.
