= Batocera migsominea =

Scientific classification
- Domain: Eukaryota
- Kingdom: Animalia
- Phylum: Arthropoda
- Class: Insecta
- Order: Coleoptera
- Suborder: Polyphaga
- Infraorder: Cucujiformia
- Family: Cerambycidae
- Genus: Batocera
- Species: B. migsominea

Binomial name
- Batocera migsominea Gilmour & Dibb, 1948

Species of beetle

Batocera migsominea is a species of beetle in the family Cerambycidae. It was described by Gilmour and Dibb in 1948. It is known from Tonkin, Vietnam; and Laos.
