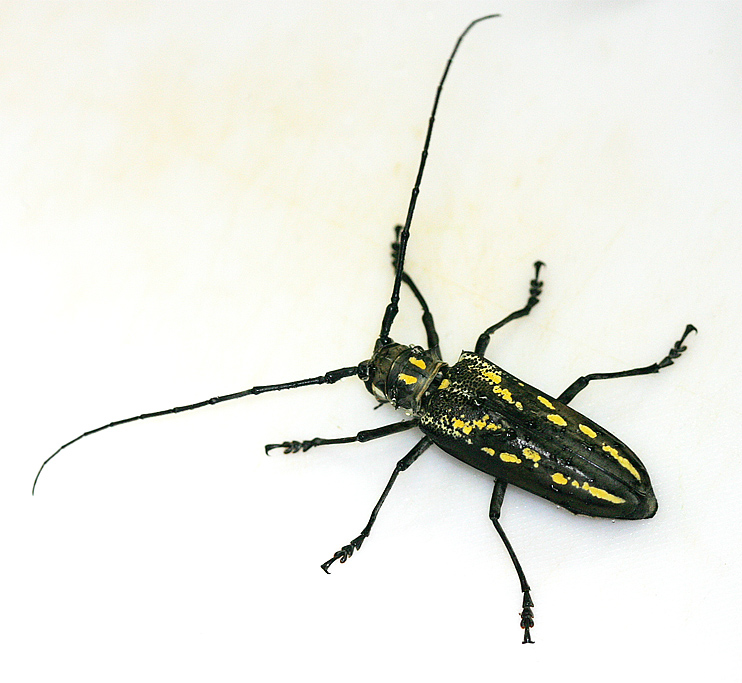

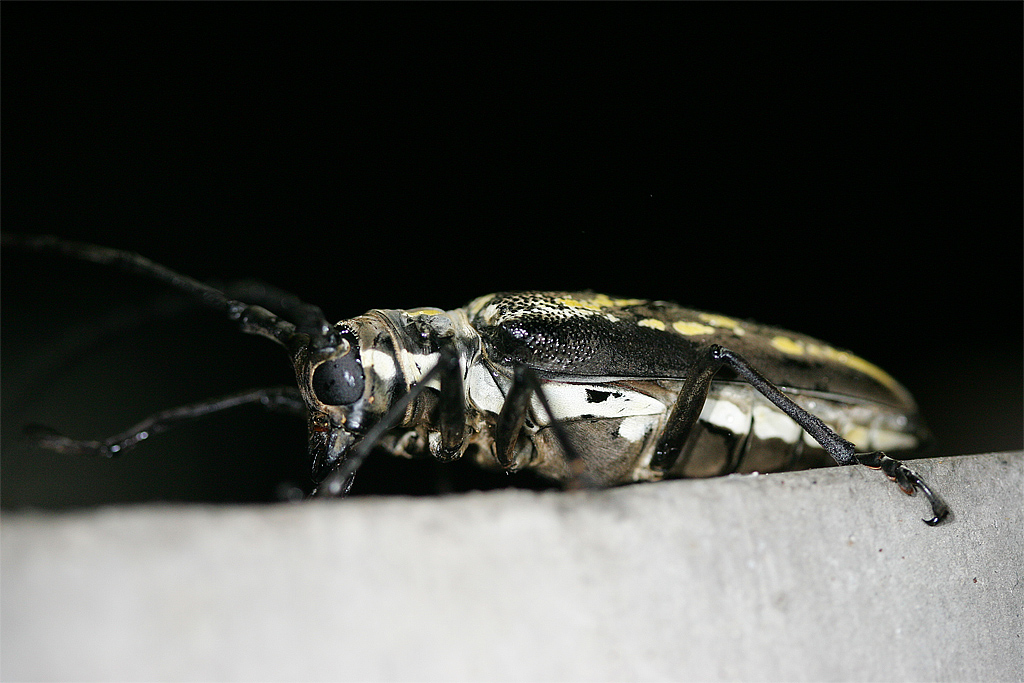

Scientific classification
- Kingdom: Animalia
- Phylum: Arthropoda
- Clade: Pancrustacea
- Class: Insecta
- Order: Coleoptera
- Suborder: Polyphaga
- Infraorder: Cucujiformia
- Family: Cerambycidae
- Genus: Batocera
- Species: B. lineolata

Binomial name
- Batocera lineolata Chevrolat, 1852

Synonyms
- Batocera catenata Vollenhoven, 1871; Batocera chinensis Thomson, 1857; Batocera flachi Schwarzer, 1914; Batocera hauseri Schwarzer, 1914

= Batocera lineolata =

Species of beetle

Batocera lineolata, commonly known as the white-striped longhorned beetle, is a species of longhorn beetle in the family Cerambycidae. It was described by Louis Alexandre Auguste Chevrolat in 1852. It is found in China, Korea, Japan, Taiwan, Vietnam, Myanmar and India. It is a forestry pest whose adults and larvae bore into tree bark, damaging vascular tissues and sometimes causing affected trees to wilt or die.

== Genomics ==
A chromosome-level genome assembly of Batocera lineolata was published in 2026. The assembly spans approximately 328.0 Mb across 18 scaffolds, with 94.5% of the sequence anchored to 10 chromosomes. It has a BUSCO completeness of 98.8% and contains 12,030 predicted protein-coding genes.
