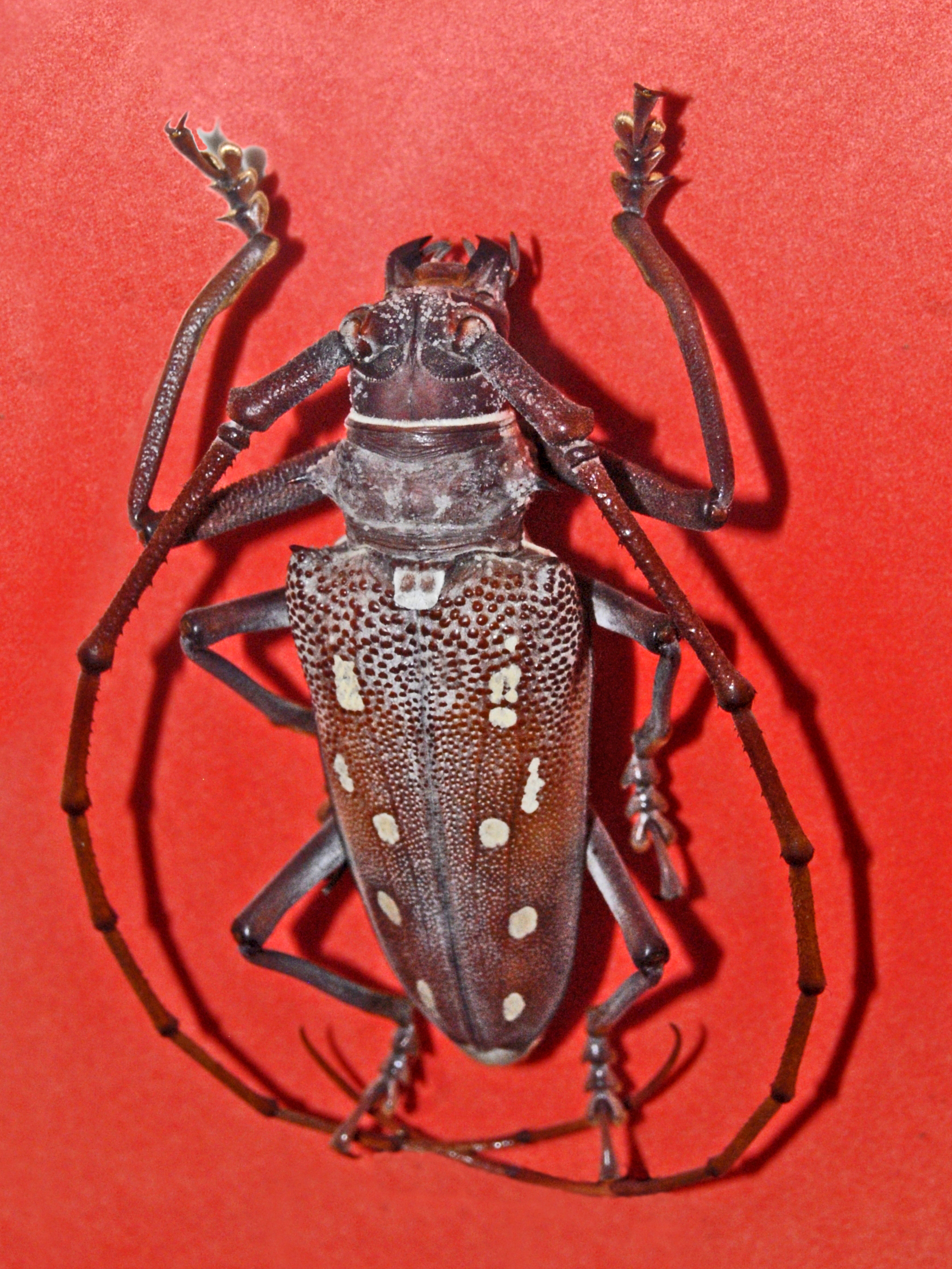
- Museum specimen of Batocera boisduvali

Scientific classification
- Domain: Eukaryota
- Kingdom: Animalia
- Phylum: Arthropoda
- Class: Insecta
- Order: Coleoptera
- Suborder: Polyphaga
- Infraorder: Cucujiformia
- Family: Cerambycidae
- Genus: Batocera
- Species: B. boisduvali

Binomial name
- Batocera boisduvali (Hope, 1839)

= Batocera boisduvali =

Species of beetle

Batocera boisduvali, the great fig tree borer, is a species of flat-faced longhorn beetle belonging to the subfamily Lamiinae of the family Cerambycidae.

== Description ==
Batocera boisduvali is a large longhorn beetle reaching 50–57 millimetres (2.0–2.2 in) of length.

The elytra of these beetles show a dark grey colour with white to yellowish spots.

Adults feed on the sap of the bark, while larvae bore tunnels into the trunk and larger branches. Larval host plants are native fig trees Ficus watkinsiana, Ficus rubiginosa, Ficus microphylla, Ficus ehretioides (Moraceae) and Alstonia scholaris (Apocynaceae).

== Distribution and habitat ==
This species can be found in rainforests of New South Wales and Queensland (Australia).
