= Batocera gerstaeckerii =

Scientific classification
- Kingdom: Animalia
- Phylum: Arthropoda
- Class: Insecta
- Order: Coleoptera
- Suborder: Polyphaga
- Infraorder: Cucujiformia
- Family: Cerambycidae
- Genus: Batocera
- Species: B. gerstaeckerii

Binomial name
- Batocera gerstaeckerii Thomson, 1865

Species of beetle

Batocera gerstaeckerii is a species of beetle in the family Cerambycidae. It was described by Thomson in 1865. It is known from the Moluccas.
