= Batocera enganensis =

Scientific classification
- Domain: Eukaryota
- Kingdom: Animalia
- Phylum: Arthropoda
- Class: Insecta
- Order: Coleoptera
- Suborder: Polyphaga
- Infraorder: Cucujiformia
- Family: Cerambycidae
- Genus: Batocera
- Species: B. enganensis

Binomial name
- Batocera enganensis Gahan, 1907

Species of beetle

Batocera enganensis is a species of beetle in the family Cerambycidae. It was described by Gahan in 1907. It is known from Sumatra.
