= Batocera hercules =

Scientific classification
- Domain: Eukaryota
- Kingdom: Animalia
- Phylum: Arthropoda
- Class: Insecta
- Order: Coleoptera
- Suborder: Polyphaga
- Infraorder: Cucujiformia
- Family: Cerambycidae
- Genus: Batocera
- Species: B. hercules

Binomial name
- Batocera hercules Boisduval, 1835

Species of beetle

Batocera hercules is a species of beetle in the family Cerambycidae. It was described by Jean Baptiste Boisduval in 1835. It is known from Indonesia and the Philippines. The species measures between 50 and 85 millimeters.
