= Batocera malleti =

Scientific classification
- Domain: Eukaryota
- Kingdom: Animalia
- Phylum: Arthropoda
- Class: Insecta
- Order: Coleoptera
- Suborder: Polyphaga
- Infraorder: Cucujiformia
- Family: Cerambycidae
- Genus: Batocera
- Species: B. malleti

Binomial name
- Batocera malleti Schmitt, 2000

Species of beetle

Batocera malleti is a species of beetle in the family Cerambycidae. It was described by Schmitt in 2000. It is known from Laos.
