= Batocera oceanica =

Scientific classification
- Domain: Eukaryota
- Kingdom: Animalia
- Phylum: Arthropoda
- Class: Insecta
- Order: Coleoptera
- Suborder: Polyphaga
- Infraorder: Cucujiformia
- Family: Cerambycidae
- Genus: Batocera
- Species: B. oceanica

Binomial name
- Batocera oceanica Schwarzer, 1914

Synonyms
- Batocera kolbei Kriesche, 1915

Species of beetle

Batocera oceanica is a species of beetle in the family Cerambycidae. It was described by Schwarzer in 1914. It is known from the Western Carolines.
