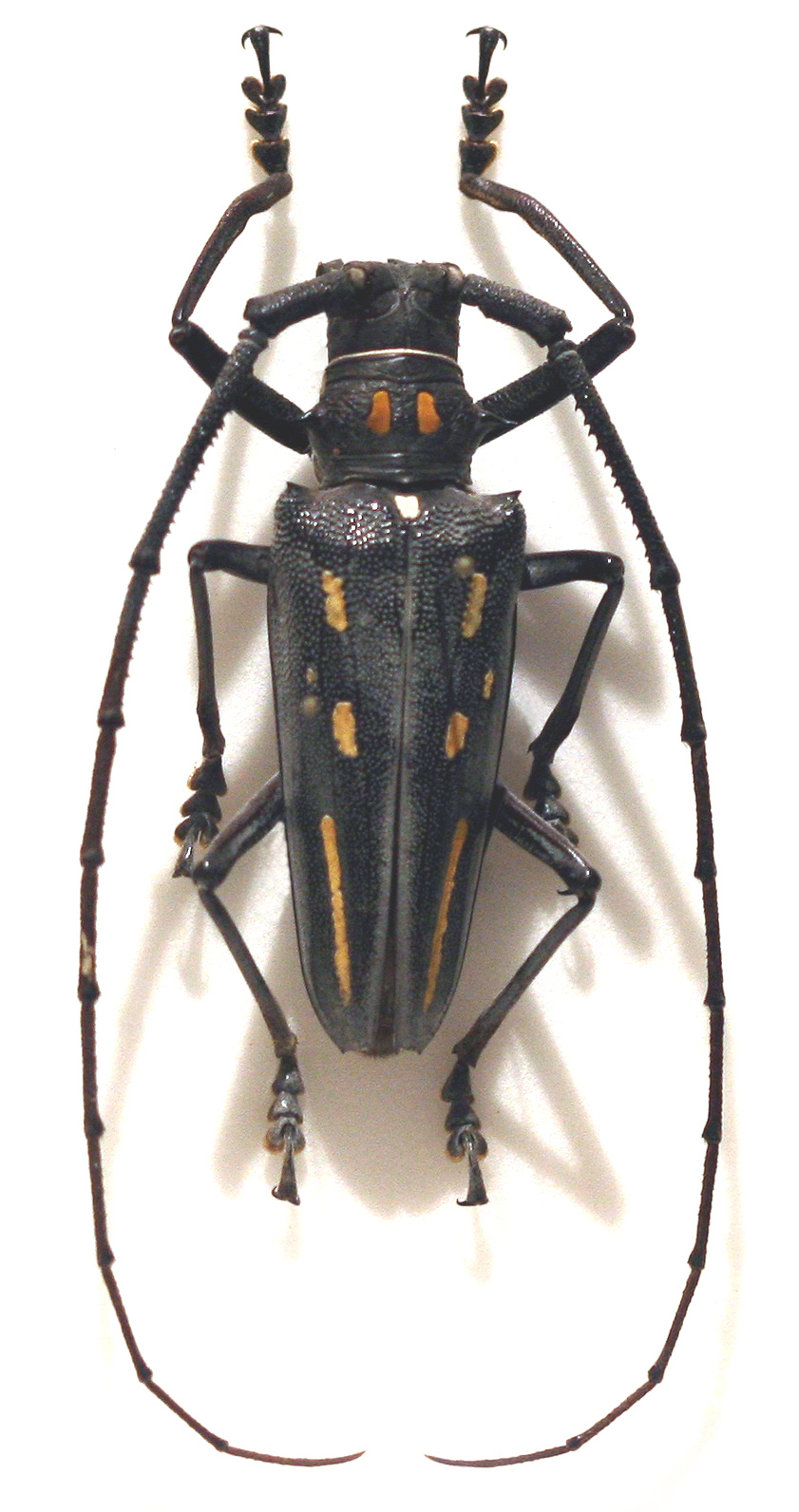

Scientific classification
- Domain: Eukaryota
- Kingdom: Animalia
- Phylum: Arthropoda
- Class: Insecta
- Order: Coleoptera
- Suborder: Polyphaga
- Infraorder: Cucujiformia
- Family: Cerambycidae
- Genus: Batocera
- Species: B. rosenbergi

Binomial name
- Batocera rosenbergi Kaup, 1866

= Batocera rosenbergi =

Species of beetle

Batocera rosenbergi is a species of beetle in the family Cerambycidae. It was described by Kaup in 1866. It is known from Indonesia.
