= Batocera armata =

Scientific classification
- Kingdom: Animalia
- Phylum: Arthropoda
- Clade: Pancrustacea
- Class: Insecta
- Order: Coleoptera
- Suborder: Polyphaga
- Infraorder: Cucujiformia
- Family: Cerambycidae
- Genus: Batocera
- Species: B. armata

Binomial name
- Batocera armata (Olivier, 1800)

Synonyms
- Cerambyx thomae Voet, 1778 (nomen nudum); Cerambyx armatus Olivier, 1800; Batocera lacordairei Thomson, 1865; Batocera whitei Kaup, 1866; Batocera ammon Pascoe, 1866; Batocera orcus Pascoe, 1866

Species of beetle

Batocera armata is a species of flat-faced longhorn beetle in the subfamily Lamiinae of the family Cerambycidae. While originally named as "Cerambyx thomae" by Voet in 1778, no name was validly published for this species until 1800; Voet's 1778 work fails to fulfill the requirement in ICZN Article 11.4 that a work must be consistently binomial, and all names within that work are unavailable.
