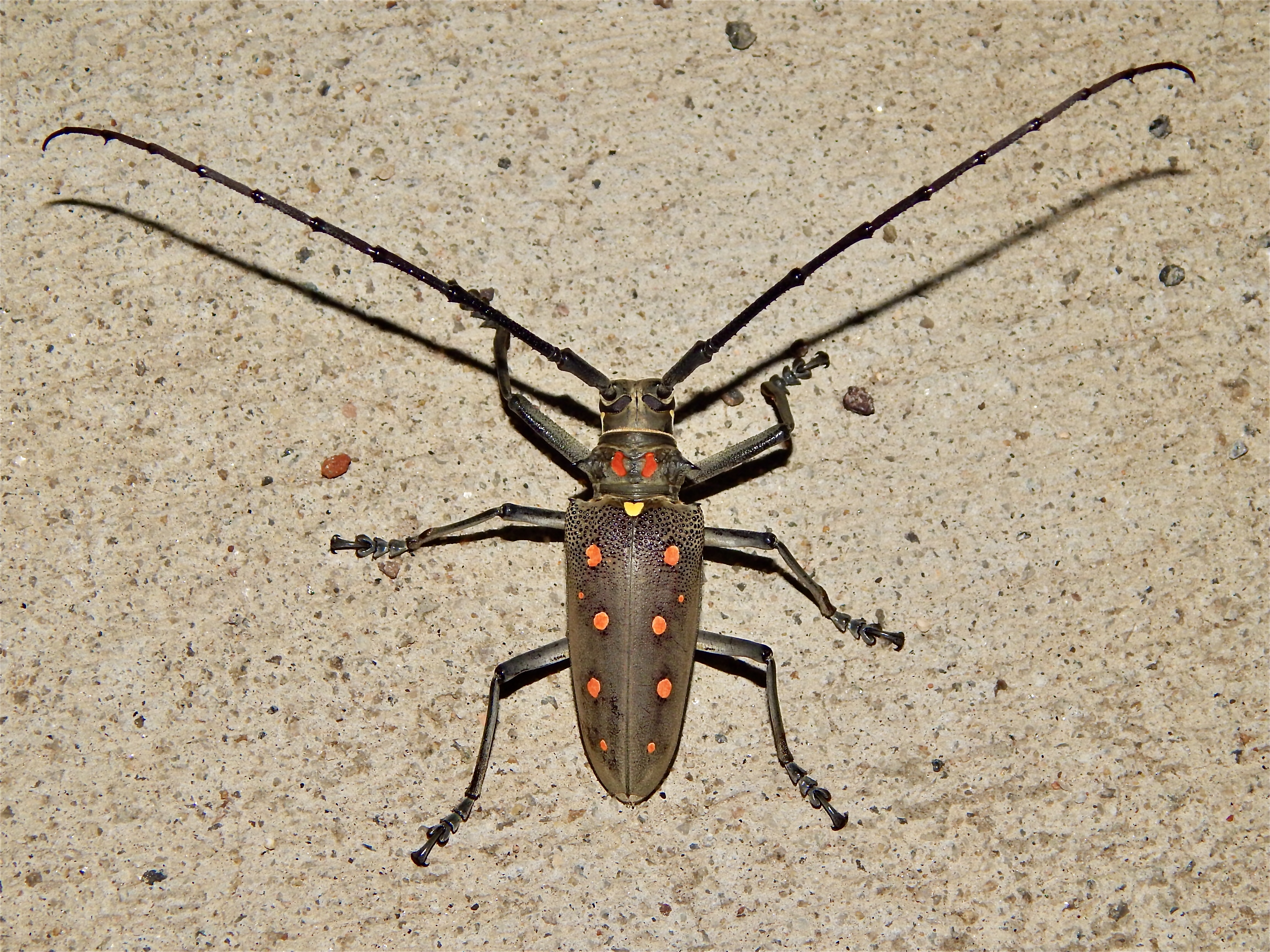

Scientific classification
- Kingdom: Animalia
- Phylum: Arthropoda
- Clade: Pancrustacea
- Class: Insecta
- Order: Coleoptera
- Suborder: Polyphaga
- Infraorder: Cucujiformia
- Family: Cerambycidae
- Genus: Batocera
- Species: B. rubus

Binomial name
- Batocera rubus (Linnaeus, 1758)

Synonyms
- Batocera octomaculata (Fabricius); Cerambyx albomaculatus Retzius, 1783; Cerambyx rubus Linnaeus, 1758; Lamia downesi Hope, 1845; Lamia octomaculata Fabricius, 1792

= Batocera rubus =

Species of beetle

Batocera rubus, the mango longhorn or rubber root borer, is a species of beetle in the family Cerambycidae. It was described by Carl Linnaeus in his landmark 1758 10th edition of Systema Naturae. It is known from Japan, China, Java, India, Laos, Myanmar, Malaysia, the Philippines, South Korea, Taiwan, Sumatra, Thailand, and Vietnam. It feeds on Ficus carica, Ficus elastica, and Mangifera indica. It's a medium-large species of longhorn beetle that measures a length of 20-65 mm from head to tip.

== Subspecies ==
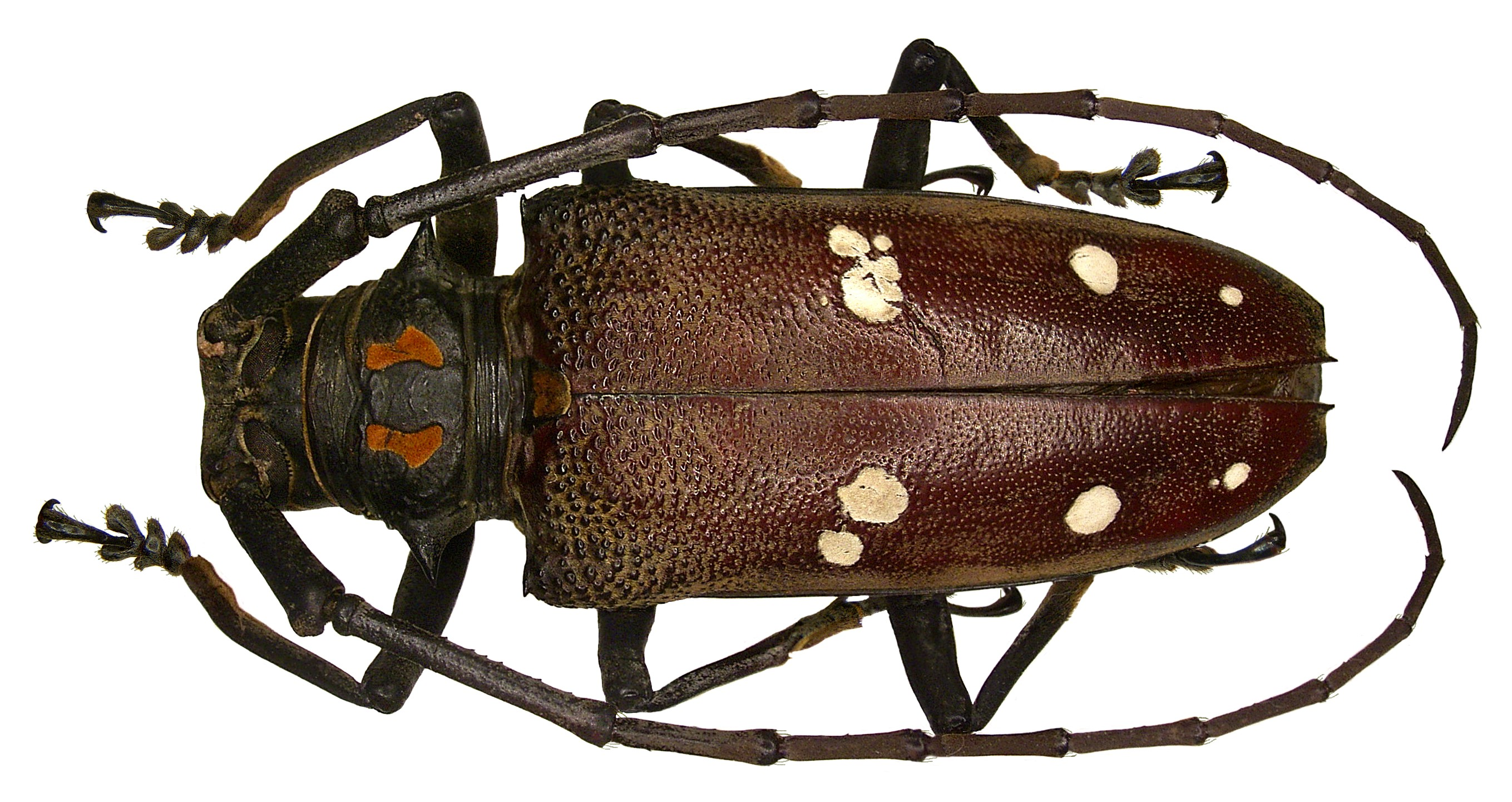

- Batocera rubus mniszechi Thomson, 1859
- Batocera rubus palawanica Kaup, 1866
- Batocera rubus rubus (Linnaeus, 1758)
