= Batocera matzdorffi =

Scientific classification
- Kingdom: Animalia
- Phylum: Arthropoda
- Class: Insecta
- Order: Coleoptera
- Suborder: Polyphaga
- Infraorder: Cucujiformia
- Family: Cerambycidae
- Genus: Batocera
- Species: B. matzdorffi

Binomial name
- Batocera matzdorffi Kriesche, 1915

Species of beetle

Batocera matzdorffi is a species of beetle in the family Cerambycidae. It was described by Kriesche in 1915. It is known from Papua New Guinea.

Distribution and Habitat Batocera matzdorffi is native to the island of New Guinea . Specific collection records exist from locations in Papua New Guinea, including Buin . The genus Batocera is widespread, with a primary distribution from northern India through Southeast Asia and into Indonesia, New Guinea, the Solomon Islands, and Australia, with minor representation in Africa
