= Batocera chevrolati =

Scientific classification
- Domain: Eukaryota
- Kingdom: Animalia
- Phylum: Arthropoda
- Class: Insecta
- Order: Coleoptera
- Suborder: Polyphaga
- Infraorder: Cucujiformia
- Family: Cerambycidae
- Genus: Batocera
- Species: B. chevrolati

Binomial name
- Batocera chevrolati Thomson, 1859

Species of beetle

Batocera chevrolati is a species of beetle in the family Cerambycidae. It was described by Thomson in 1859. It is known from India.
