= Batocera inconspicua =

Scientific classification
- Domain: Eukaryota
- Kingdom: Animalia
- Phylum: Arthropoda
- Class: Insecta
- Order: Coleoptera
- Suborder: Polyphaga
- Infraorder: Cucujiformia
- Family: Cerambycidae
- Genus: Batocera
- Species: B. inconspicua

Binomial name
- Batocera inconspicua Van de Poll, 1890

Species of beetle

Batocera inconspicua is a species of beetle in the family Cerambycidae. It was described by Van de Poll in 1890. It is known from New Guinea and the Solomon Islands. The species measures between 49 and 63 millimeters. It contains the varietas Batocera inconspicua var. germanica.
