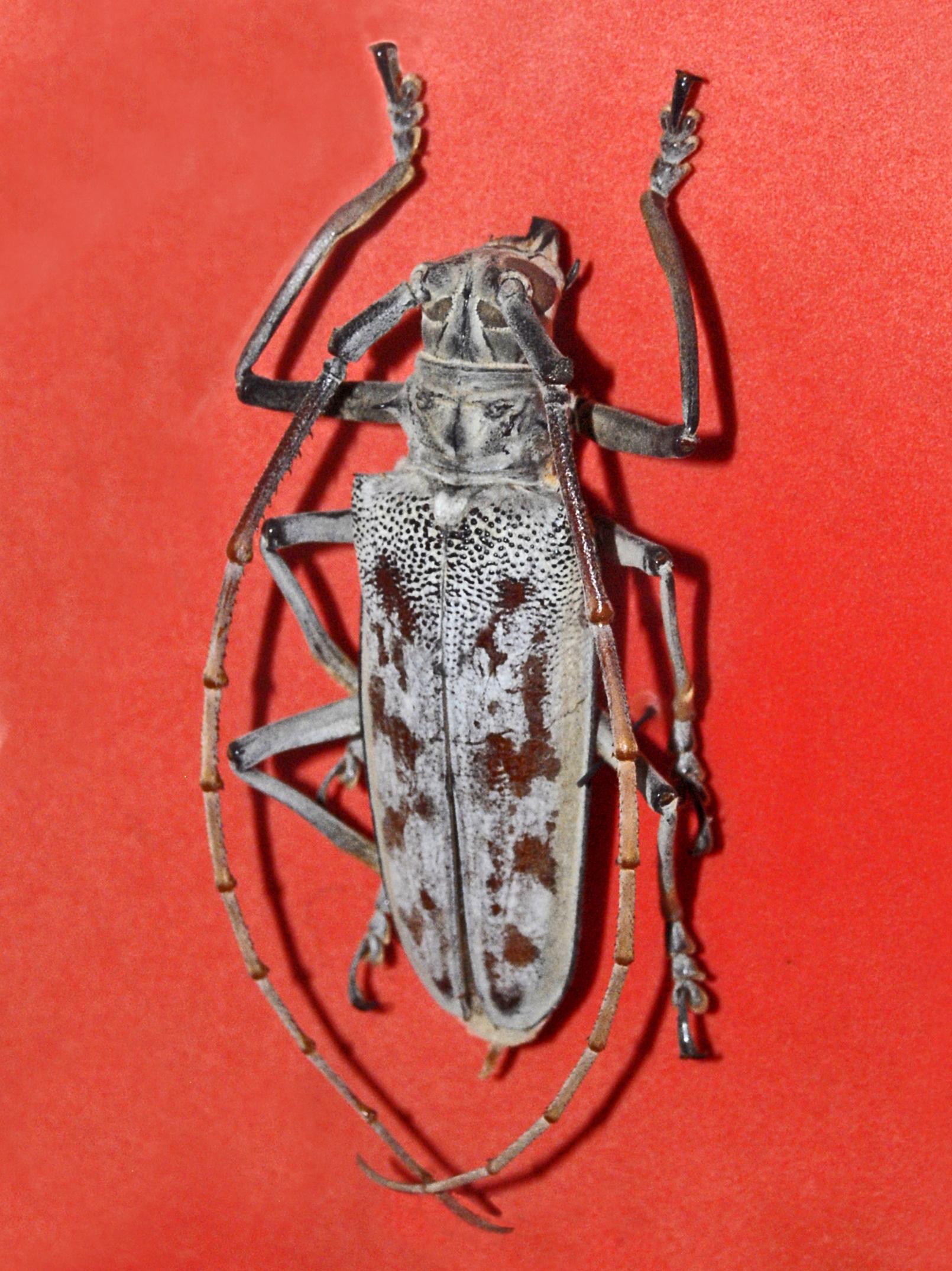

Scientific classification
- Kingdom: Animalia
- Phylum: Arthropoda
- Clade: Pancrustacea
- Class: Insecta
- Order: Coleoptera
- Suborder: Polyphaga
- Infraorder: Cucujiformia
- Family: Cerambycidae
- Genus: Batocera
- Species: B. maculata

Binomial name
- Batocera maculata (Schönherr, 1817)

Synonyms
- Lamia tigris Voet, 1778 (nomen nudum); Batocera tigris (Voet, 1778); Batocera hector Thomson, 1858; Batocera helena J. Thomson, 1865; Batocera attila Pascoe, 1866; Batocera borneensis Schwarzer, 1929; Batocera baluana Kriesche, 1940; Batocera menelaus Breuning, 1948; Batocera odysseus Gilmour & Dibb, 1948

= Batocera maculata =

Species of beetle

Batocera maculata is a species of flat-faced longhorn beetle in the subfamily Lamiinae of the family Cerambycidae. While originally named as "Lamia tigris" by Voet in 1778, no name was validly published for this species until 1817; Voet's 1778 work fails to fulfill the requirement in ICZN Article 11.4 that a work must be consistently binomial, and all names within that work are unavailable.

== Description ==
Batocera maculata is a large long-horn beetle reaching 55–70 millimetres (2.2–2.8 in) of length. The body color is quite variable, but usually it is greyish or whitish with dark brown markings. Adults of this widespread species can be seen from April to August.

== Distribution ==
This species is present in Thailand, Malaysia, Sumatra, Java and Borneo.
