= Batocera nebulosa =

Scientific classification
- Domain: Eukaryota
- Kingdom: Animalia
- Phylum: Arthropoda
- Class: Insecta
- Order: Coleoptera
- Suborder: Polyphaga
- Infraorder: Cucujiformia
- Family: Cerambycidae
- Genus: Batocera
- Species: B. nebulosa

Binomial name
- Batocera nebulosa Bates, 1877

Species of beetle

Batocera nebulosa is a species of beetle in the family Cerambycidae. It was described by Bates in 1877. It is known from Papua New Guinea.
