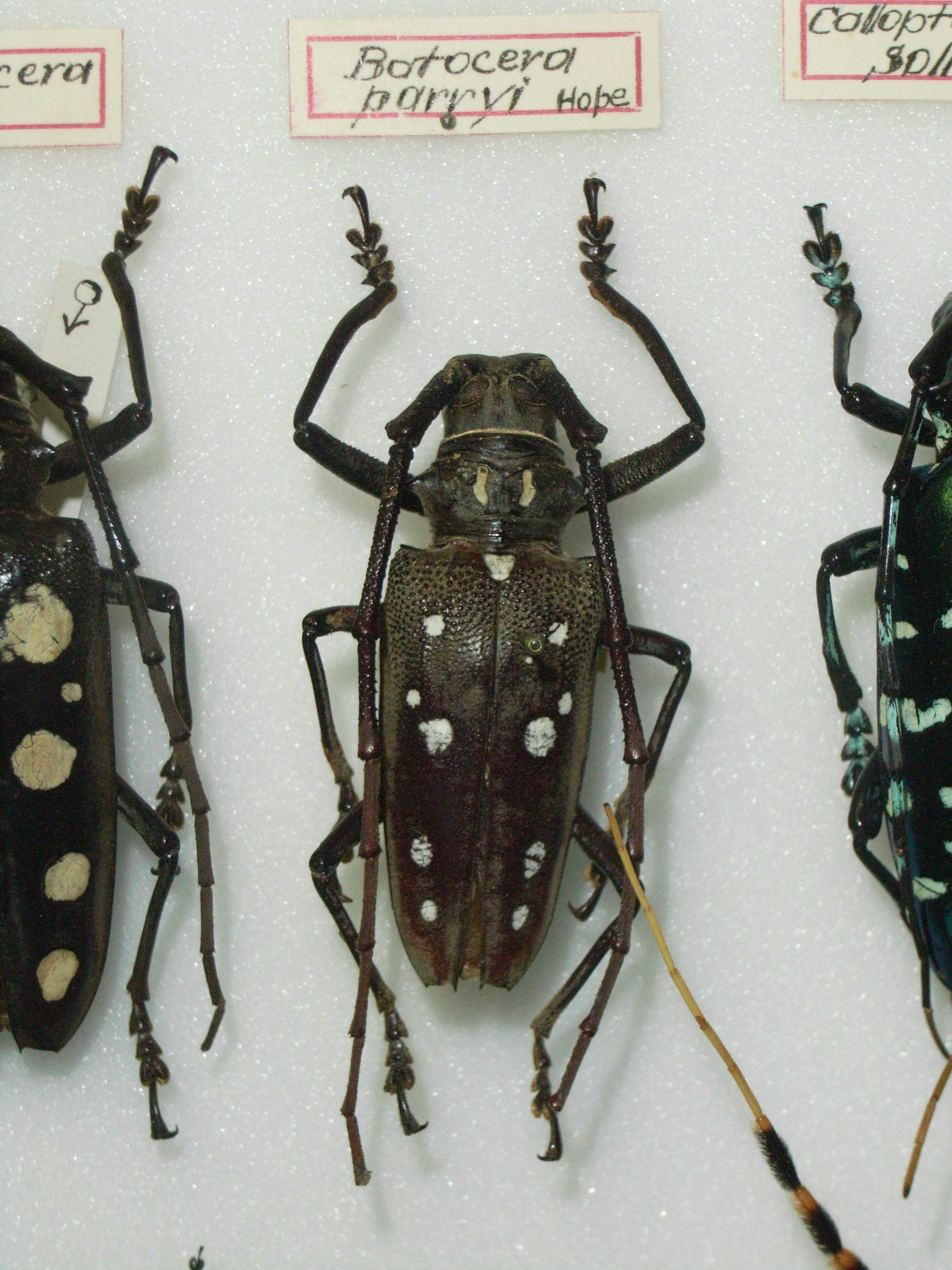

Scientific classification
- Kingdom: Animalia
- Phylum: Arthropoda
- Clade: Pancrustacea
- Class: Insecta
- Order: Coleoptera
- Suborder: Polyphaga
- Infraorder: Cucujiformia
- Family: Cerambycidae
- Genus: Batocera
- Species: B. parryi

Binomial name
- Batocera parryi (Hope, 1845)

Synonyms
- Batocera (Semibatocera) calanus (Parry) Kriesche, 1914; Batocera albofasciata Heyne & Taschenberg, 1908; Lamia calanus Parry, 1845; Lamia parryi Hope, 1845

= Batocera parryi =

Species of beetle

Batocera parryi is a species of beetle in the family Cerambycidae. It was described by Hope in 1845. It is known from China, India, Laos, Java, Myanmar, Malaysia, Sumatra, and Vietnam.

== Varietas ==
- Batocera parryi var. bimaculata Schwarzer, 1914
- Batocera parryi var. fabricii Thomson, 1878
- Batocera parryi var. guttata (Snellen van Vollenhoven, 1871)
- Batocera parryi var. immaculata Schwarzer, 1914
- Batocera parryi var. narada Kriesche, 1928
