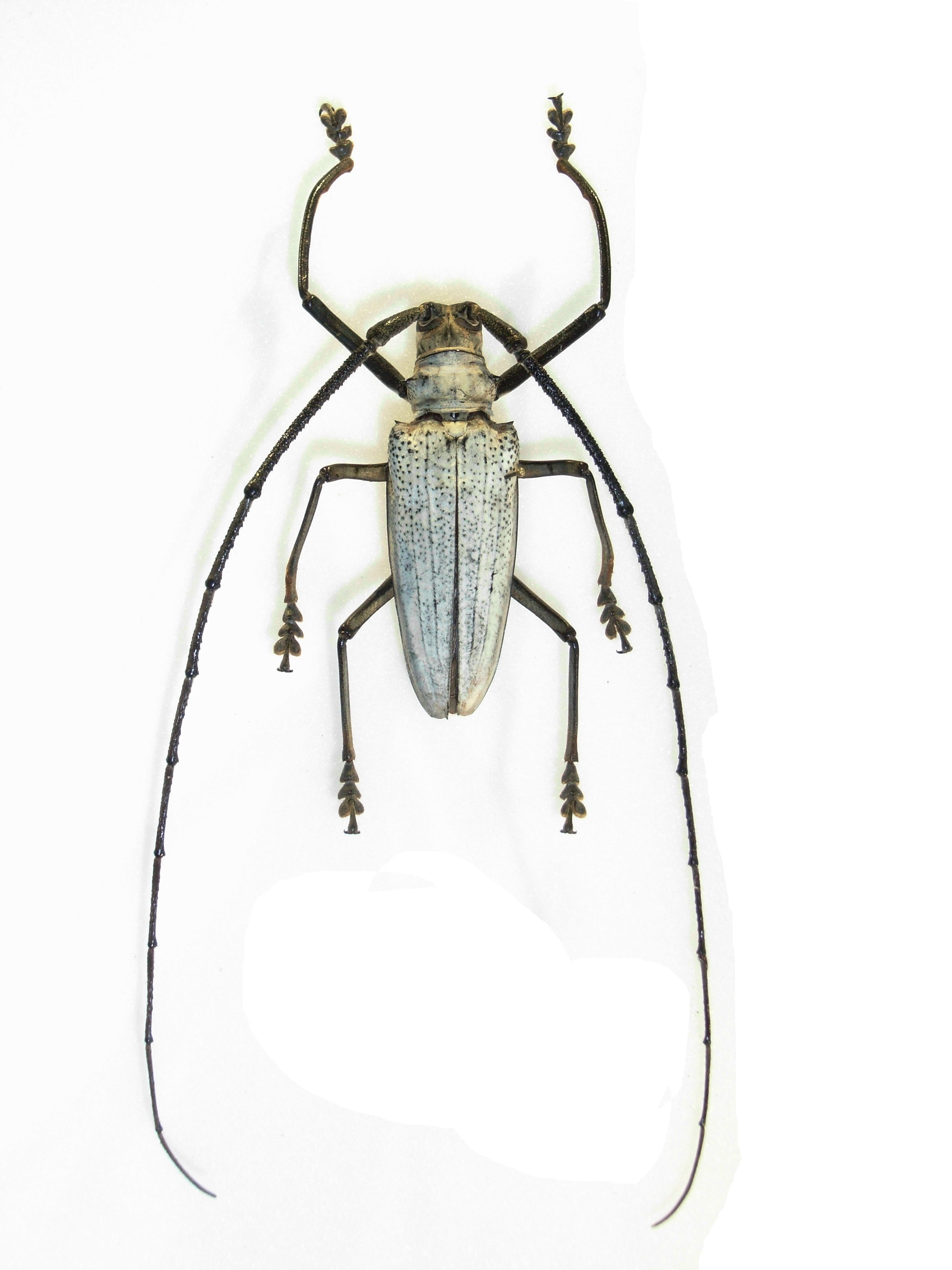

Scientific classification
- Domain: Eukaryota
- Kingdom: Animalia
- Phylum: Arthropoda
- Class: Insecta
- Order: Coleoptera
- Suborder: Polyphaga
- Infraorder: Cucujiformia
- Family: Cerambycidae
- Genus: Batocera
- Species: B. una

Binomial name
- Batocera una White, 1858

Synonyms
- Batocera porioni Rigout, 1987

= Batocera una =

Species of beetle

Batocera una is a species of beetle in the family Cerambycidae. It was described from three female specimens by Adam White in 1858. It is known from the Solomon Islands and Vanuatu.
