= Batocera breuningi =

Scientific classification
- Domain: Eukaryota
- Kingdom: Animalia
- Phylum: Arthropoda
- Class: Insecta
- Order: Coleoptera
- Suborder: Polyphaga
- Infraorder: Cucujiformia
- Family: Cerambycidae
- Genus: Batocera
- Species: B. breuningi

Binomial name
- Batocera breuningi Gilmour & Dibb, 1948

Species of beetle

Batocera breuningi is a species of beetle in the family Cerambycidae. It was described by Gilmour and Dibb in 1948. It is known from Tonkin. It is a rare species which could be possibly threatened in later years.
