= Batocera bruyni =

Scientific classification
- Kingdom: Animalia
- Phylum: Arthropoda
- Clade: Pancrustacea
- Class: Insecta
- Order: Coleoptera
- Suborder: Polyphaga
- Infraorder: Cucujiformia
- Family: Cerambycidae
- Genus: Batocera
- Species: B. bruyni

Binomial name
- Batocera bruyni Lansborough, 1880

Synonyms
- Batocera bruijni (Lansberge, 1880) (misspelling); Batocera bruyni (Lansberge, 1880) (misspelling)

Species of beetle

Batocera bruyni is a species of beetle in the family Cerambycidae. It was described by Lansborough in 1880. It is known from Sulawesi.
