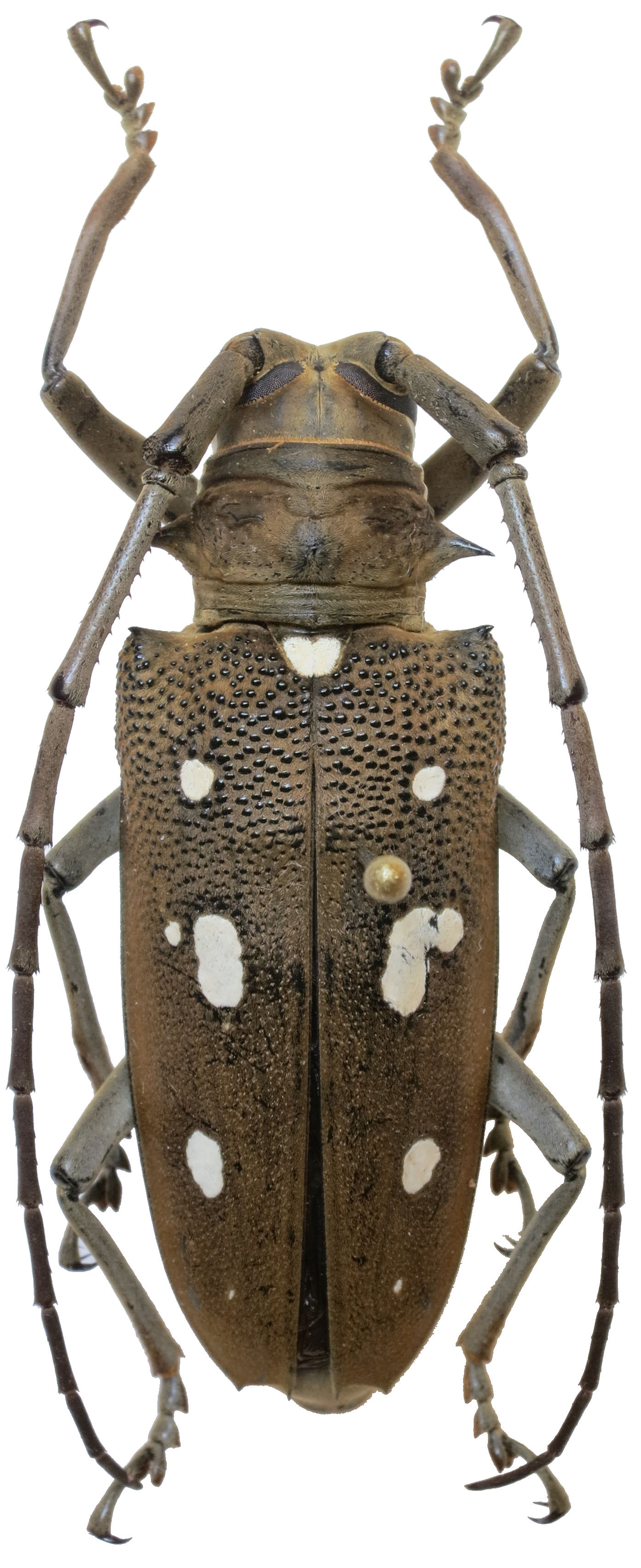
- Batocera magica female from Philippines

Scientific classification
- Kingdom: Animalia
- Phylum: Arthropoda
- Clade: Pancrustacea
- Class: Insecta
- Order: Coleoptera
- Suborder: Polyphaga
- Infraorder: Cucujiformia
- Family: Cerambycidae
- Genus: Batocera
- Species: B. magica

Binomial name
- Batocera magica Thomson, 1859

Synonyms
- Batocera albofasciata magica (Thomson) Heller, 1924; Batocera rubus var. magica (Thomson) Gilmour & Dibb, 1948

= Batocera magica =

Species of beetle

Batocera magica is a species of beetle in the family Cerambycidae. It was described by Thomson in 1859. It is known from Java and the Philippines.
