= Batocera timorlautensis =

Scientific classification
- Kingdom: Animalia
- Phylum: Arthropoda
- Class: Insecta
- Order: Coleoptera
- Suborder: Polyphaga
- Infraorder: Cucujiformia
- Family: Cerambycidae
- Genus: Batocera
- Species: B. timorlautensis

Binomial name
- Batocera timorlautensis Heller, 1897

Species of beetle

Batocera timorlautensis is a species of beetle in the family Cerambycidae. It was described by Heller in 1897. It is known from the Moluccas.
