= Batocera itzingeri =

Scientific classification
- Kingdom: Animalia
- Phylum: Arthropoda
- Class: Insecta
- Order: Coleoptera
- Suborder: Polyphaga
- Infraorder: Cucujiformia
- Family: Cerambycidae
- Genus: Batocera
- Species: B. itzingeri

Binomial name
- Batocera itzingeri (Breuning, 1943)

Synonyms
- Megacriodes albinicans Devecis, 1990; Megacriodes itzingeri Breuning, 1943

Species of beetle

Batocera itzingeri is a species of beetle in the family Cerambycidae. It was described by Stephan von Breuning in 1943.
