= Batocera sumbaensis =

Scientific classification
- Domain: Eukaryota
- Kingdom: Animalia
- Phylum: Arthropoda
- Class: Insecta
- Order: Coleoptera
- Suborder: Polyphaga
- Infraorder: Cucujiformia
- Family: Cerambycidae
- Genus: Batocera
- Species: B. sumbaensis

Binomial name
- Batocera sumbaensis Franz, 1972

Species of beetle

Batocera sumbaensis is a species of beetle in the family Cerambycidae. It was described by Franz in 1972. It is known from Sumba Island.
