= Batocera sentis =

Scientific classification
- Kingdom: Animalia
- Phylum: Arthropoda
- Class: Insecta
- Order: Coleoptera
- Suborder: Polyphaga
- Infraorder: Cucujiformia
- Family: Cerambycidae
- Genus: Batocera
- Species: B. sentis

Binomial name
- Batocera sentis (Linnaeus, 1758)

Synonyms
- Cerambyx sentis Linnaeus, 1758

Species of beetle

Batocera sentis is a species of beetle in the family Cerambycidae. It was described by Carl Linnaeus in his landmark 1758 10th edition of Systema Naturae. It is known from India.
