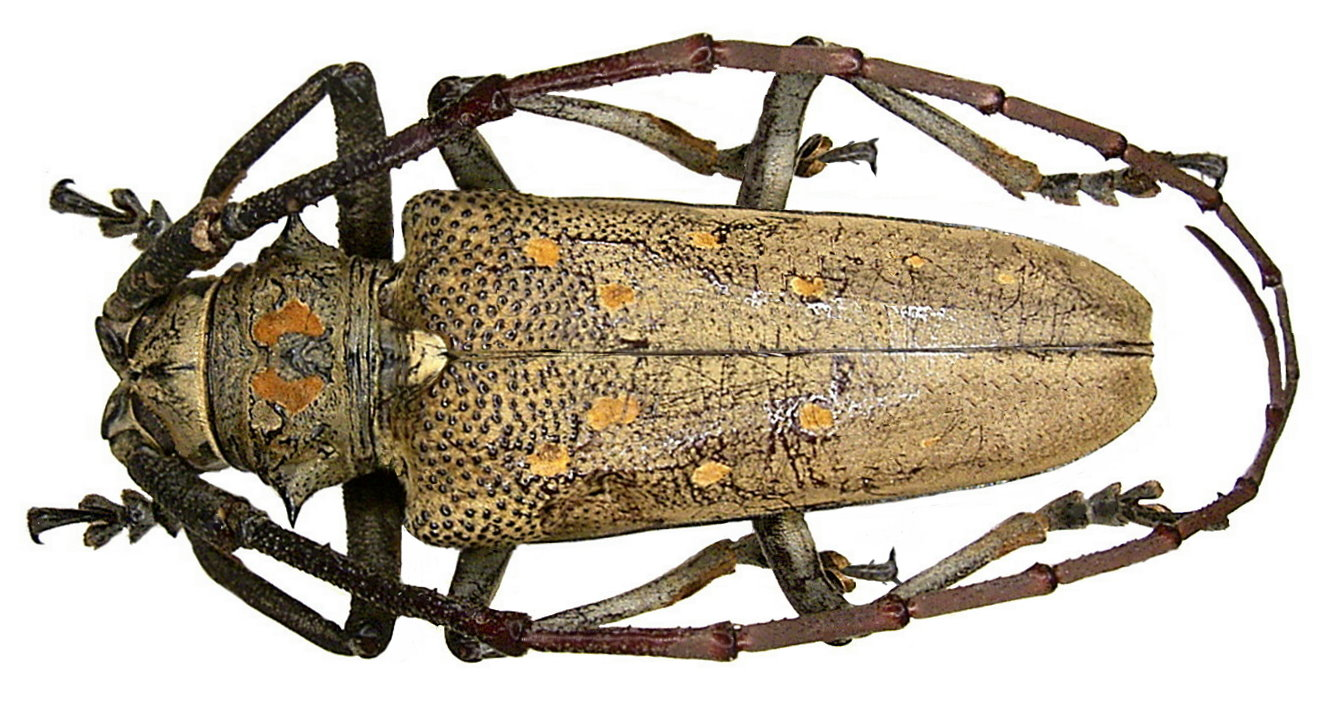

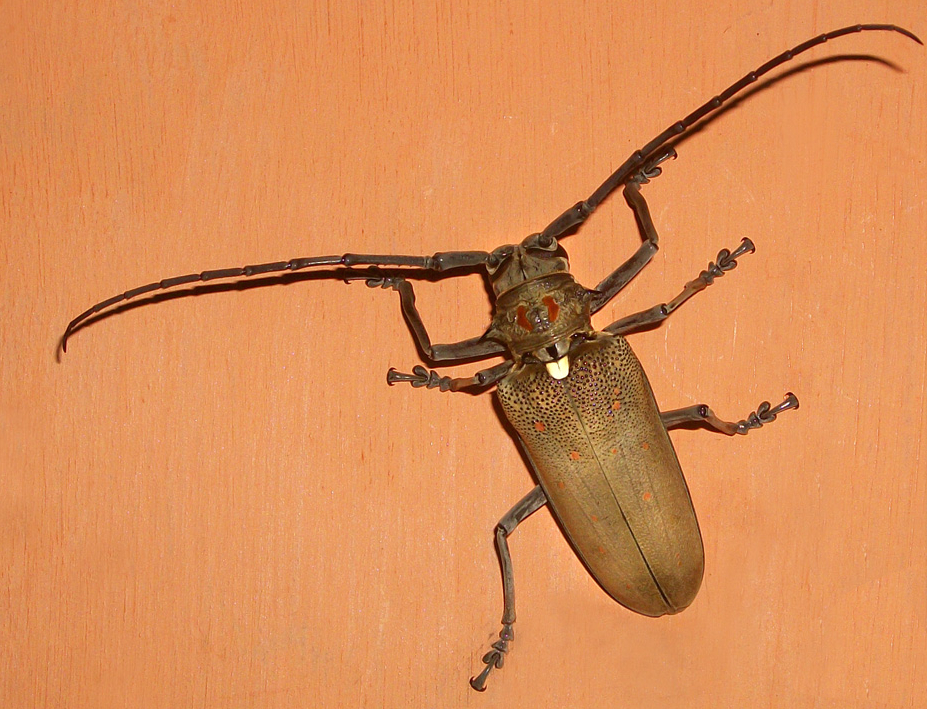

Scientific classification
- Kingdom: Animalia
- Phylum: Arthropoda
- Clade: Pancrustacea
- Class: Insecta
- Order: Coleoptera
- Suborder: Polyphaga
- Infraorder: Cucujiformia
- Family: Cerambycidae
- Genus: Batocera
- Species: B. rufomaculata

Binomial name
- Batocera rufomaculata (De Geer, 1775)

Synonyms
- Cerambyx rufomaculatus DeGeer, 1775; Cerambyx rubiginosus Voet, 1778 (Unav.); Cerambyx cruentatus Gmelin, 1790

= Batocera rufomaculata =

Species of beetle

Batocera rufomaculata , also known as the mango stem borer or MSB, is a species of long-horn beetle in the family Cerambycidae. It was described by Charles De Geer in 1775. It is native to China, India, Laos, Malaysia, Myanmar, Pakistan, Sri Lanka, Thailand, and Philippines, and has been introduced to many other countries, including Israel, Jordan, Lebanon, Madagascar, Mauritius, Puerto Rico, Réunion, Syria, and the Virgin Islands.

Larvae bore into the trunks of Ficus carica, Carica papaya, Mangifera indica, and Shorea robusta and range of other plants. In fruit tree cultivation, such as that of mango, they can cause loss of yield and death of the trees. It can be parasitically infected by Avetianella batocerae.

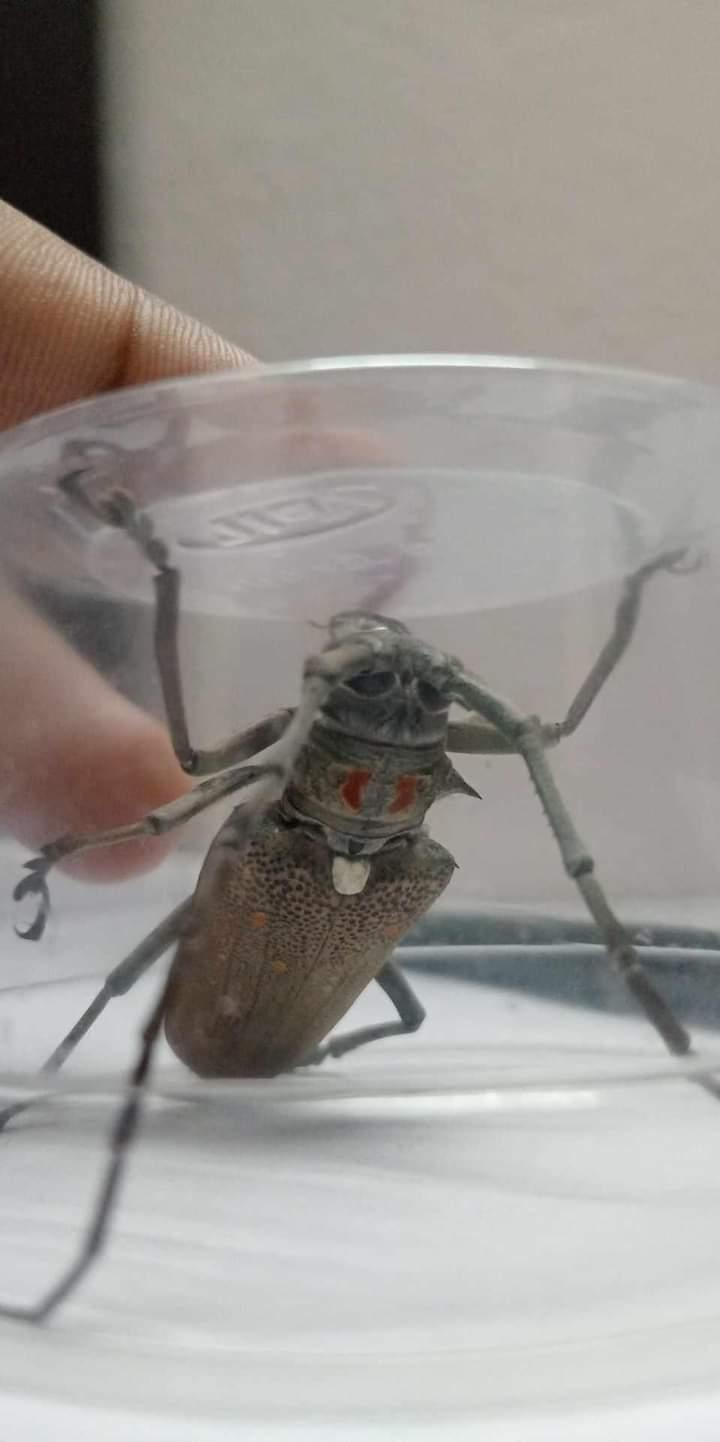
Dhaka, Bangladesh

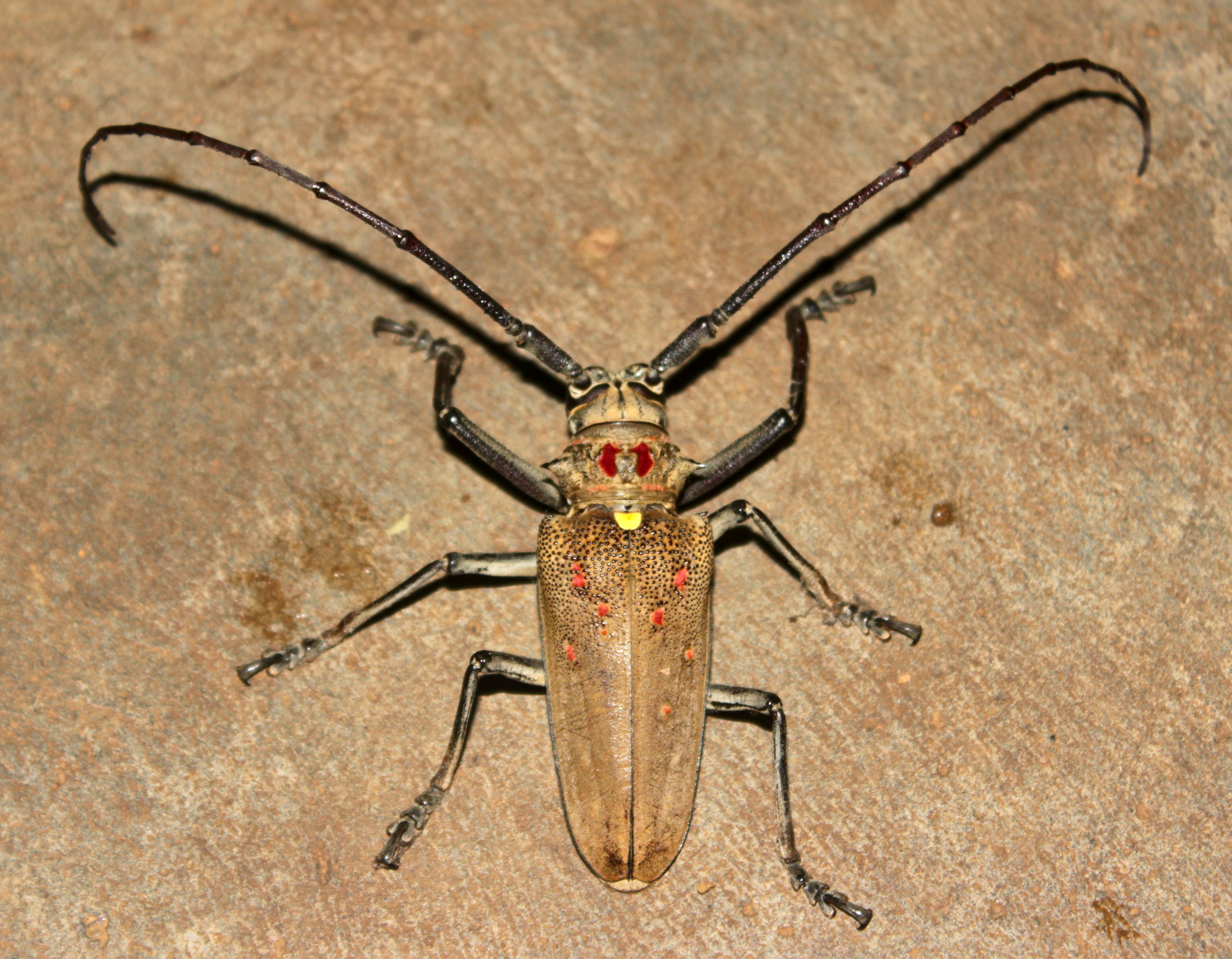
At Kanjirappally, India

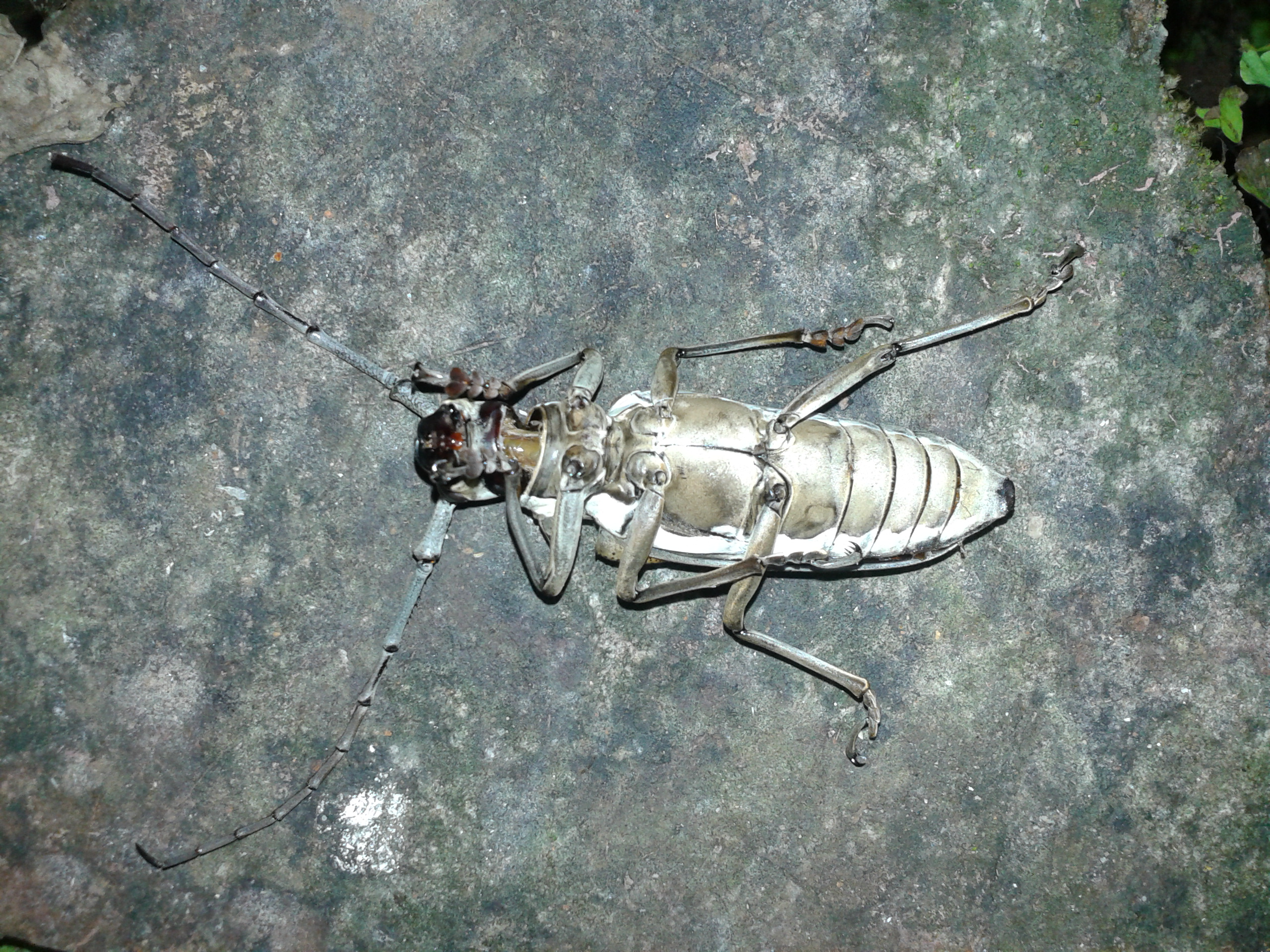
Ventral view
