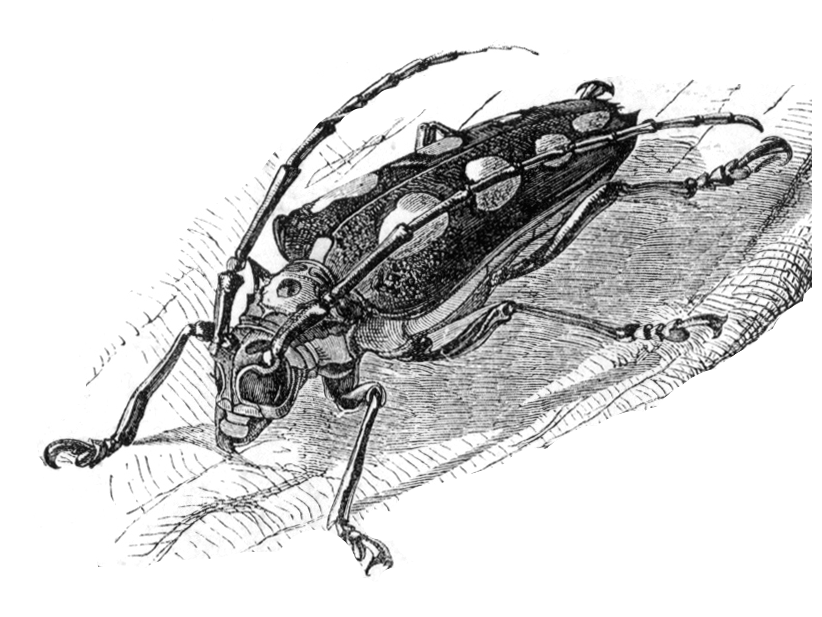

Scientific classification
- Domain: Eukaryota
- Kingdom: Animalia
- Phylum: Arthropoda
- Class: Insecta
- Order: Coleoptera
- Suborder: Polyphaga
- Infraorder: Cucujiformia
- Family: Cerambycidae
- Genus: Batocera
- Species: B. saundersii

Binomial name
- Batocera saundersii (Pascoe, 1866)

Synonyms
- Megacriodes saundersii Pascoe, 1866; Batocera (Megacriodes) saundersi (Pascoe) Kriesche, 1914 (misspelling); Megacriodes saundersi (Pascoe) Aurivillius, 1921 (misspelling)

= Batocera saundersii =

Species of beetle

Batocera saundersii is a species of beetle in the family Cerambycidae. It was described by Francis Polkinghorne Pascoe in 1866. It is known from Sumatra.
