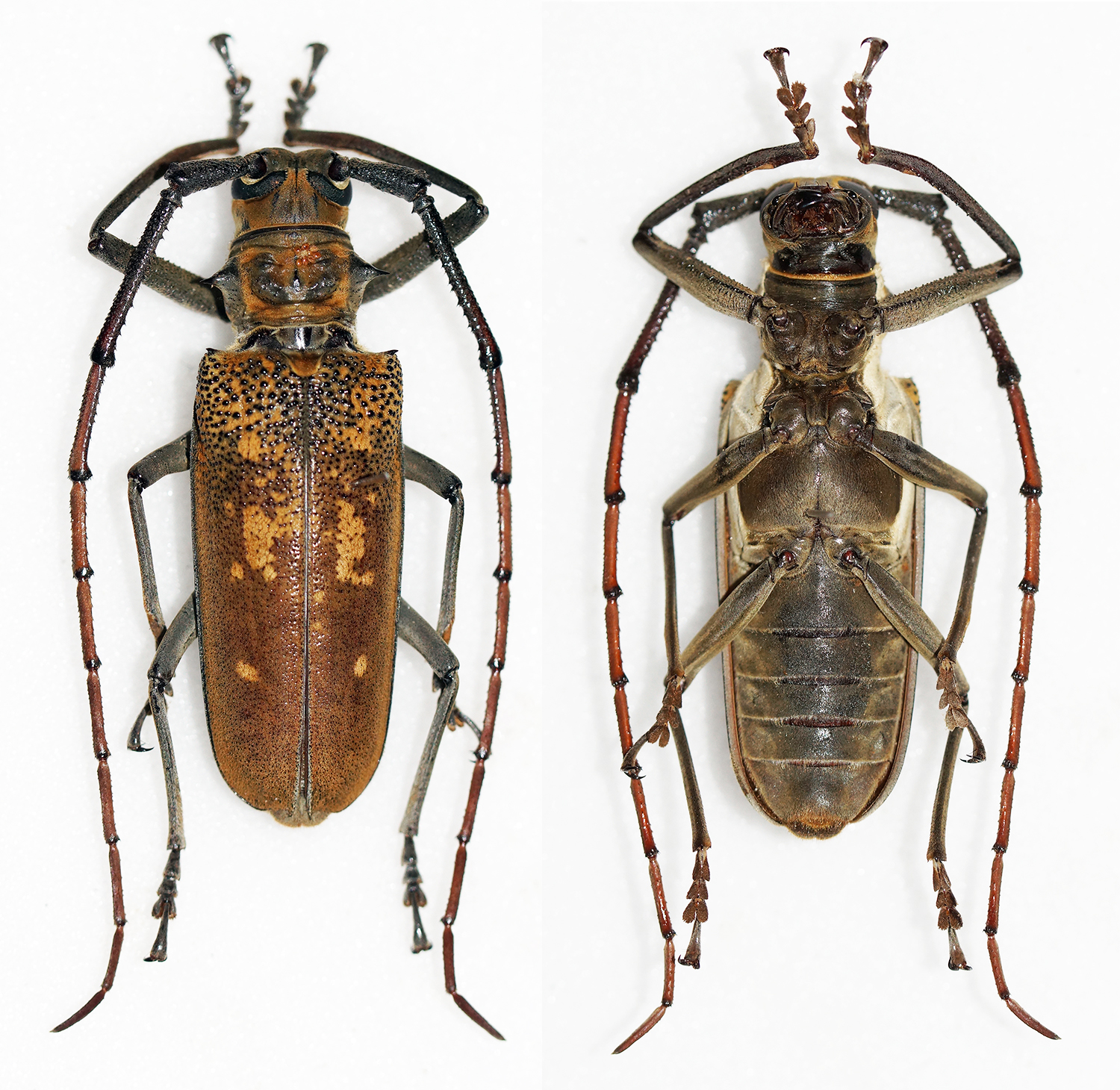

Scientific classification
- Domain: Eukaryota
- Kingdom: Animalia
- Phylum: Arthropoda
- Class: Insecta
- Order: Coleoptera
- Suborder: Polyphaga
- Infraorder: Cucujiformia
- Family: Cerambycidae
- Genus: Batocera
- Species: B. wyliei

Binomial name
- Batocera wyliei Chevrolat, 1858

Synonyms
- Batocera albertiana Thomson, 1858

= Batocera wyliei =

Species of beetle

Batocera wyliei is a species of beetle in the family Cerambycidae. It was described by Louis Alexandre Auguste Chevrolat in 1858. It is known from Cameroon, Angola, the Democratic Republic of the Congo, the Central African Republic, the Republic of the Congo, Equatorial Guinea, Gabon, the Ivory Coast, Nigeria, and Uganda.
