= Batocera thomsoni =

Scientific classification
- Kingdom: Animalia
- Phylum: Arthropoda
- Clade: Pancrustacea
- Class: Insecta
- Order: Coleoptera
- Suborder: Polyphaga
- Infraorder: Cucujiformia
- Family: Cerambycidae
- Genus: Batocera
- Species: B. thomsoni

Binomial name
- Batocera thomsoni Javet, 1858

Species of beetle

Batocera thomsoni is a species of beetle in the family Cerambycidae. It was described by Javet in 1858. It is known from Borneo, Thailand, Malaysia, and Sumatra.

== Varietas ==
- Batocera thomsoni var. bipunctulata Breuning, 1950
- Batocera thomsoni var. impunctata Breuning, 1950
