= Batocera strandi =

Scientific classification
- Kingdom: Animalia
- Phylum: Arthropoda
- Class: Insecta
- Order: Coleoptera
- Suborder: Polyphaga
- Infraorder: Cucujiformia
- Family: Cerambycidae
- Genus: Batocera
- Species: B. strandi

Binomial name
- Batocera strandi Breuning, 1954

Species of beetle

Batocera strandi is a species of beetle in the family Cerambycidae. It was described by Breuning in 1954. It is known from the Celebes Islands.
