= Batocera kibleri =

Scientific classification
- Domain: Eukaryota
- Kingdom: Animalia
- Phylum: Arthropoda
- Class: Insecta
- Order: Coleoptera
- Suborder: Polyphaga
- Infraorder: Cucujiformia
- Family: Cerambycidae
- Genus: Batocera
- Species: B. kibleri

Binomial name
- Batocera kibleri Schwarzer, 1925

Synonyms
- Batocera una (White) Kriesche, 1915

Species of beetle

Batocera kibleri is a species of beetle in the family Cerambycidae. It was described by Schwarzer in 1925. It is known from the Solomon Islands.
