= Batocera woodlarkiana =

Scientific classification
- Kingdom: Animalia
- Phylum: Arthropoda
- Clade: Pancrustacea
- Class: Insecta
- Order: Coleoptera
- Suborder: Polyphaga
- Infraorder: Cucujiformia
- Family: Cerambycidae
- Genus: Batocera
- Species: B. woodlarkiana

Binomial name
- Batocera woodlarkiana Montrouzier, 1855

Species of beetle

Batocera woodlarkiana is a species of beetle in the family Cerambycidae. It was described by Xavier Montrouzier in 1855. It is found on Woodlark Island, in Papua New Guinea, and is very rare.
