= Batocera molitor =

Scientific classification
- Domain: Eukaryota
- Kingdom: Animalia
- Phylum: Arthropoda
- Class: Insecta
- Order: Coleoptera
- Suborder: Polyphaga
- Infraorder: Cucujiformia
- Family: Cerambycidae
- Genus: Batocera
- Species: B. molitor

Binomial name
- Batocera molitor Kriesche, 1915

Species of beetle

Batocera molitor is a species of beetle in the family Cerambycidae. It was described by Kriesche in 1915. It is known from the Andaman and Nicobar Islands.
