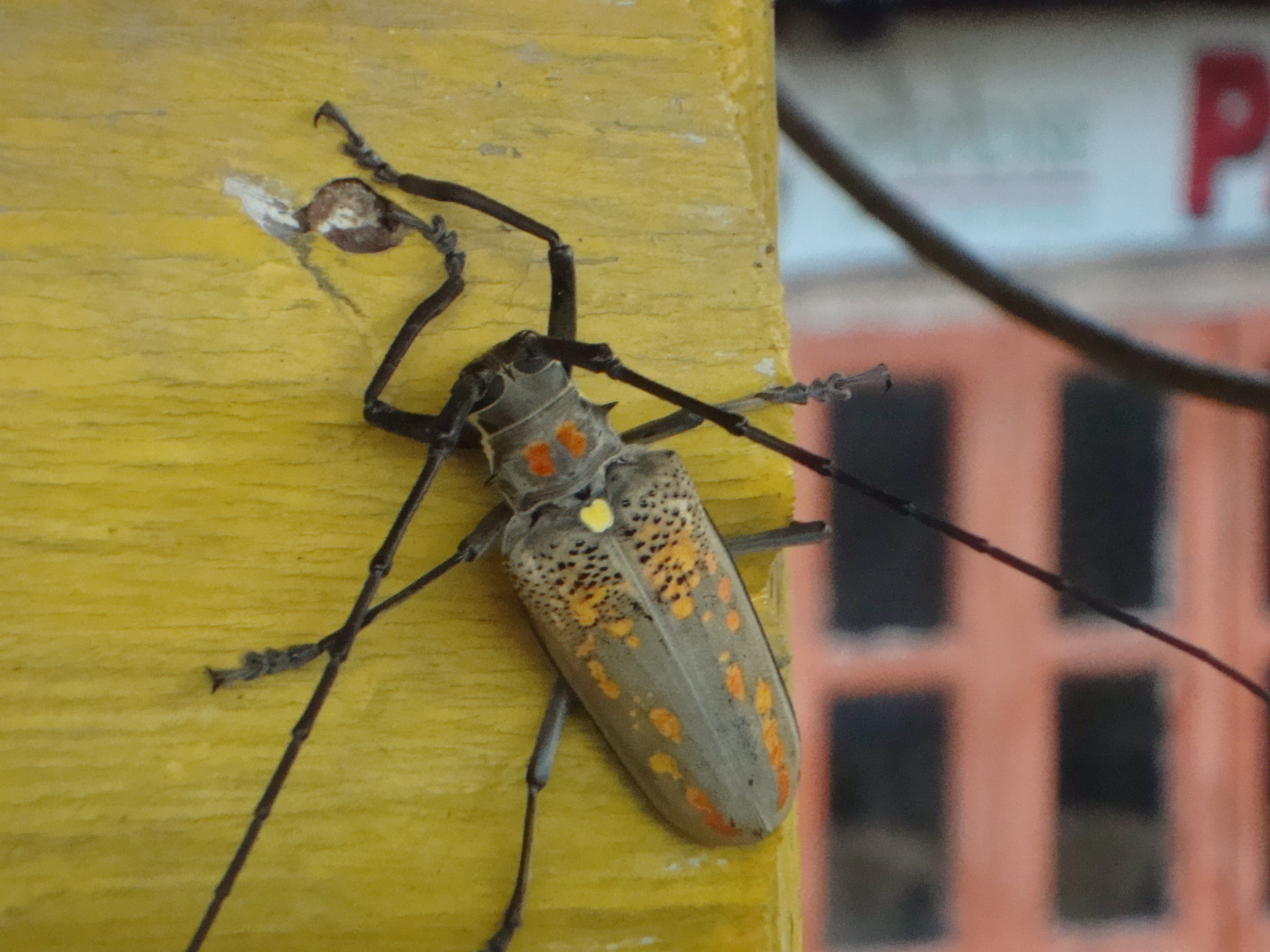
- From India

Scientific classification
- Kingdom: Animalia
- Phylum: Arthropoda
- Clade: Pancrustacea
- Class: Insecta
- Order: Coleoptera
- Suborder: Polyphaga
- Infraorder: Cucujiformia
- Family: Cerambycidae
- Genus: Batocera
- Species: B. horsfieldi

Binomial name
- Batocera horsfieldi (Hope, 1839)

= Batocera horsfieldi =

Species of beetle

Batocera horsfieldi is a species of beetle in the family Cerambycidae. It was described by Hope in 1839. It is known from Bhutan, China, India and Myanmar. The species is sometimes parasitically infected by Avetianella ambigua.
