= Batocera lethuauti =

Scientific classification
- Domain: Eukaryota
- Kingdom: Animalia
- Phylum: Arthropoda
- Class: Insecta
- Order: Coleoptera
- Suborder: Polyphaga
- Infraorder: Cucujiformia
- Family: Cerambycidae
- Genus: Batocera
- Species: B. lethuauti

Binomial name
- Batocera lethuauti Schmitt & Le Thuaut, 2000

Species of beetle

Batocera lethuauti is a species of beetle in the family Cerambycidae. It was described by Schmitt and Le Thuaut in 2000. The species lives in Sumba Island.
