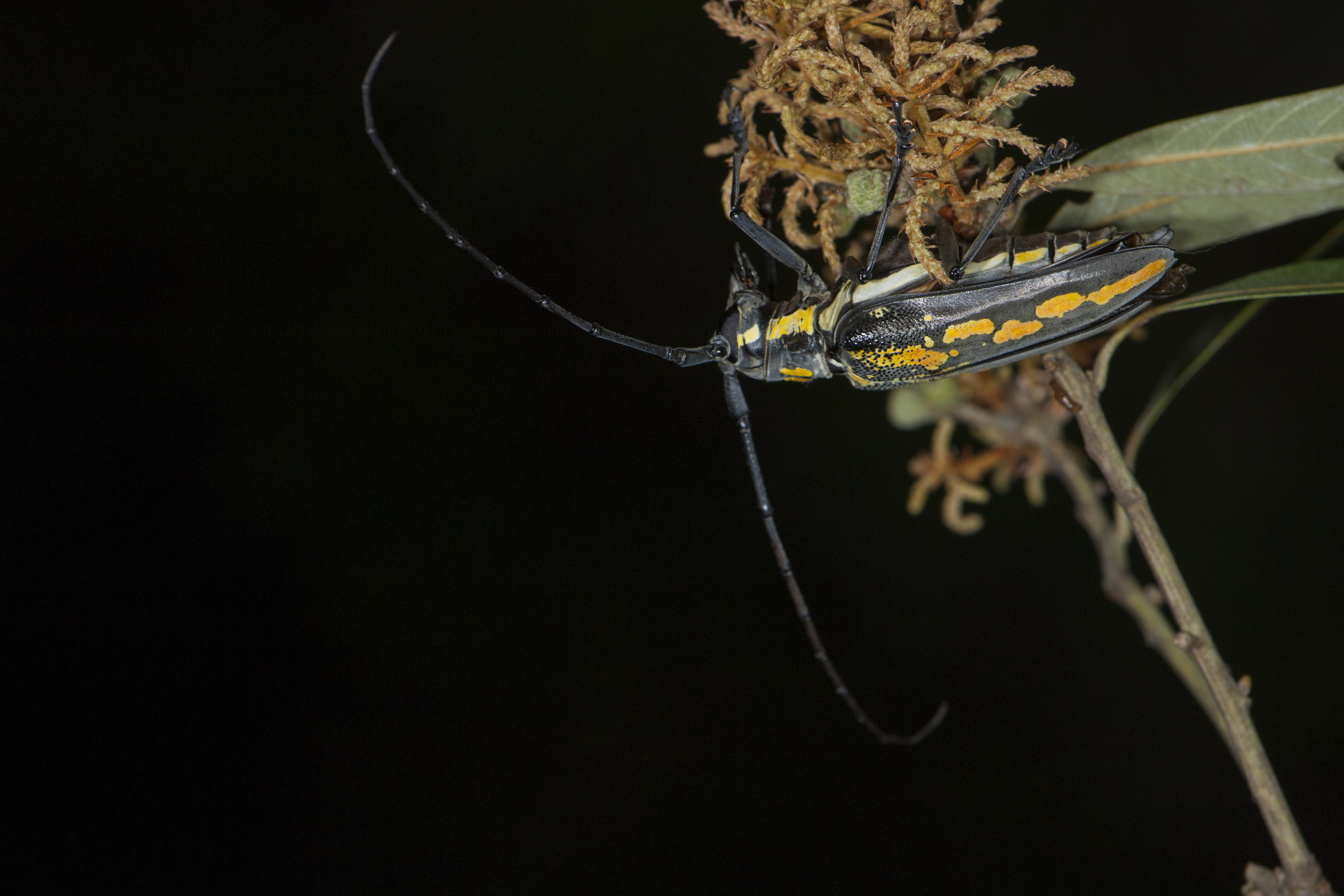

Scientific classification
- Domain: Eukaryota
- Kingdom: Animalia
- Phylum: Arthropoda
- Class: Insecta
- Order: Coleoptera
- Suborder: Polyphaga
- Infraorder: Cucujiformia
- Family: Cerambycidae
- Genus: Batocera
- Species: B. ushijimai

Binomial name
- Batocera ushijimai N. Ohbayashi, 1981

= Batocera ushijimai =

Species of beetle

Batocera ushijimai is a species of beetle in the family Cerambycidae. It was described by N. Ohbayashi in 1981. It is known from Taiwan.
