= Batocera browni =

Scientific classification
- Domain: Eukaryota
- Kingdom: Animalia
- Phylum: Arthropoda
- Class: Insecta
- Order: Coleoptera
- Suborder: Polyphaga
- Infraorder: Cucujiformia
- Family: Cerambycidae
- Genus: Batocera
- Species: B. browni

Binomial name
- Batocera browni Bates, 1877

Species of beetle

Batocera browni is a species of beetle in the family Cerambycidae. It was described by Bates in 1877. The species is known from Australia, and is extremely rare.
