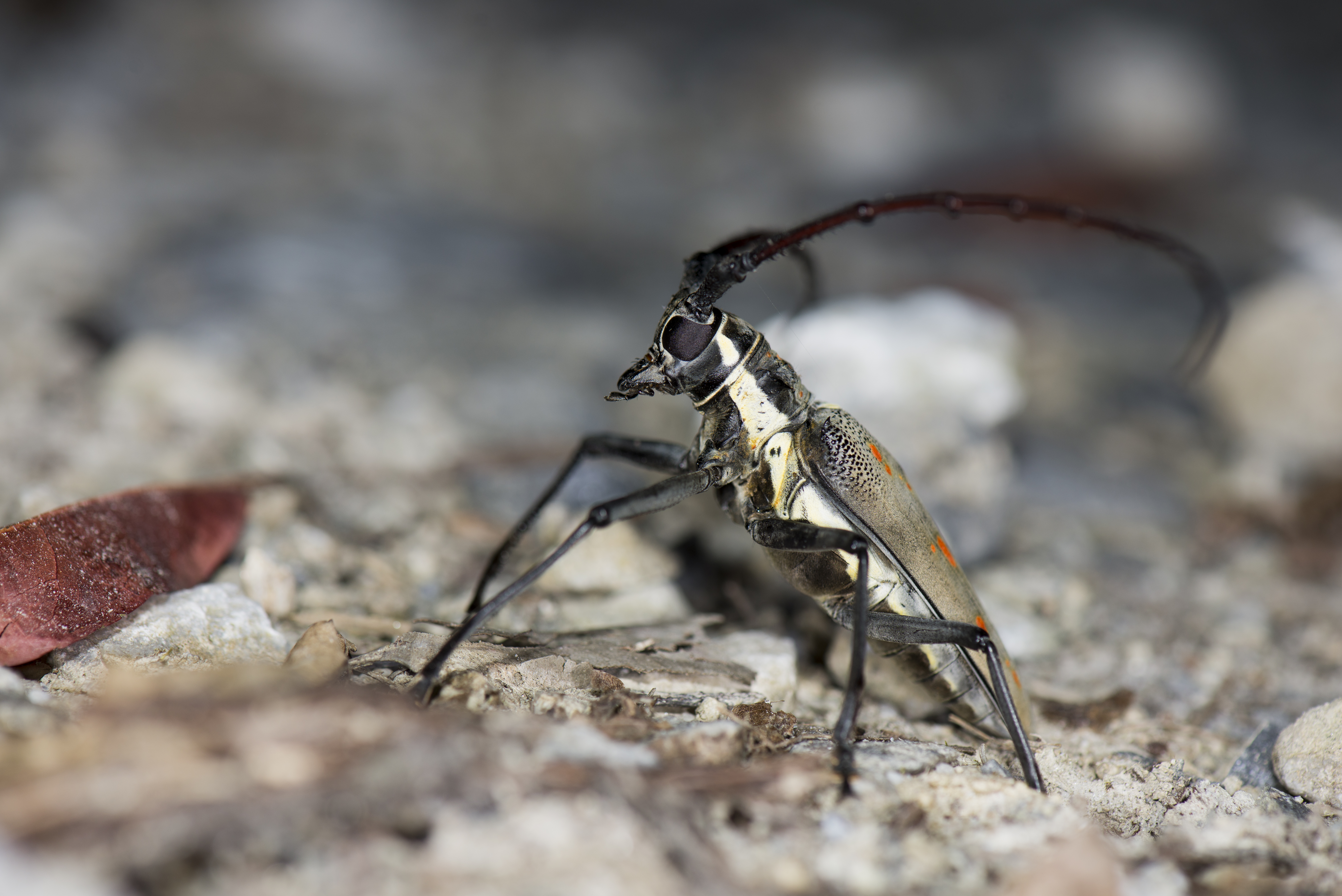

Scientific classification
- Kingdom: Animalia
- Phylum: Arthropoda
- Class: Insecta
- Order: Coleoptera
- Suborder: Polyphaga
- Infraorder: Cucujiformia
- Family: Cerambycidae
- Genus: Batocera
- Species: B. davidis

Binomial name
- Batocera davidis Fairmaire, 1878

= Batocera davidis =

Species of beetle

Batocera davidis is a species of beetle from the family Cerambycidae discovered by Leon Fairmaire in 1878. The beetle occurs in China, Taiwan, and Vietnam.
