= Batocera ammiralis =

Scientific classification
- Kingdom: Animalia
- Phylum: Arthropoda
- Class: Insecta
- Order: Coleoptera
- Suborder: Polyphaga
- Infraorder: Cucujiformia
- Family: Cerambycidae
- Genus: Batocera
- Species: B. ammiralis

Binomial name
- Batocera ammiralis Breuning, 1947

Species of beetle

Batocera ammiralis is a species of beetle in the family Cerambycidae. It was described by Breuning in 1947. It is known from Papua New Guinea.
