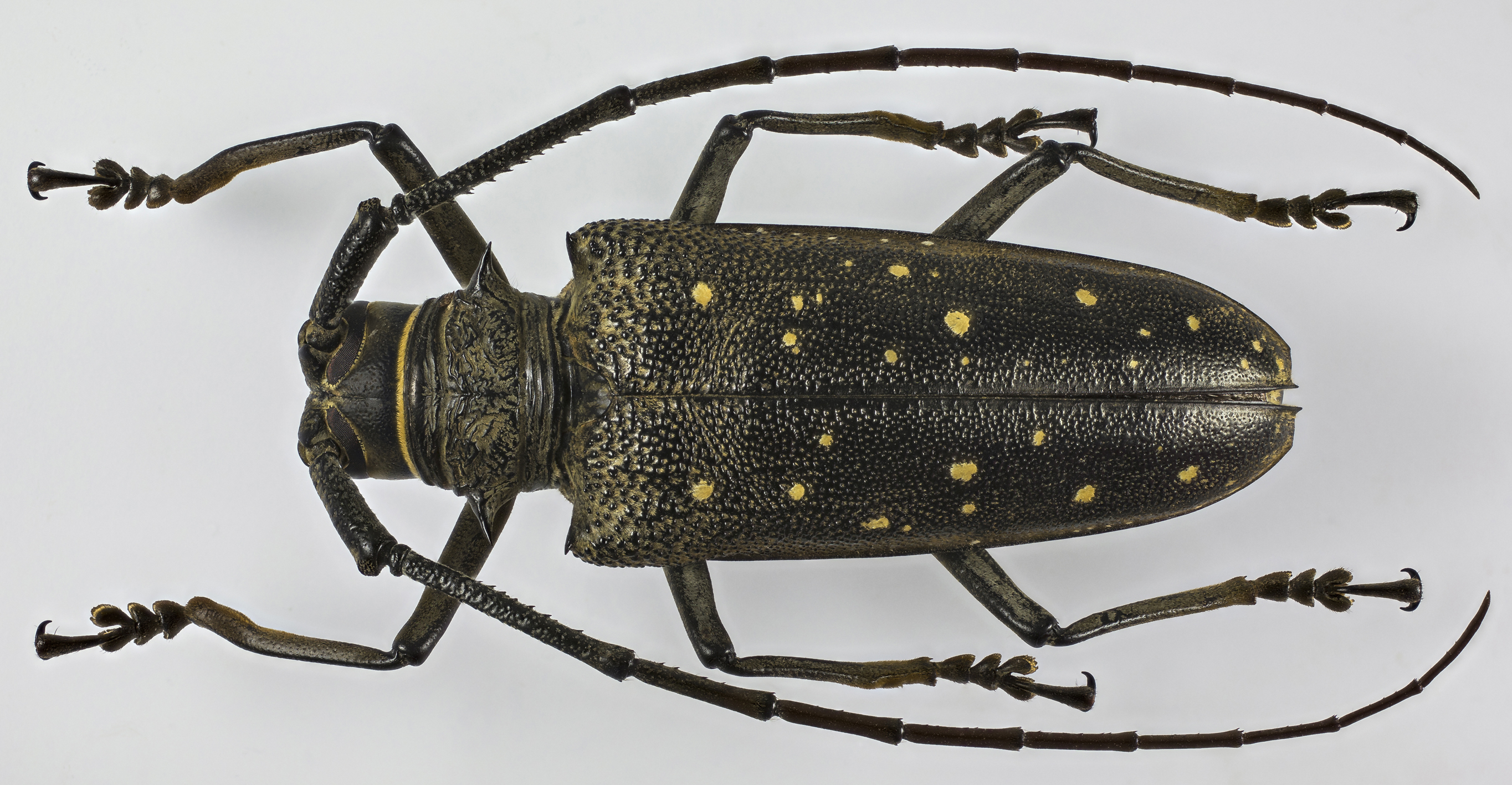

Scientific classification
- Kingdom: Animalia
- Phylum: Arthropoda
- Class: Insecta
- Order: Coleoptera
- Suborder: Polyphaga
- Infraorder: Cucujiformia
- Family: Cerambycidae
- Genus: Batocera
- Species: B. aeneonigra

Binomial name
- Batocera aeneonigra Thomson, 1859

Synonyms
- Batocera plutonica Thomson, 1865

= Batocera aeneonigra =

Species of beetle

Batocera aeneonigra is a species of beetle in the family Cerambycidae. It was described by Thomson in 1859. It is found in Papua New Guinea, the Moluccas, and East Timor.

== Subspecies ==
- Batocera aeneonigra aeneonigra Thomson, 1859
- Batocera aeneonigra occidentalis Kriesche
