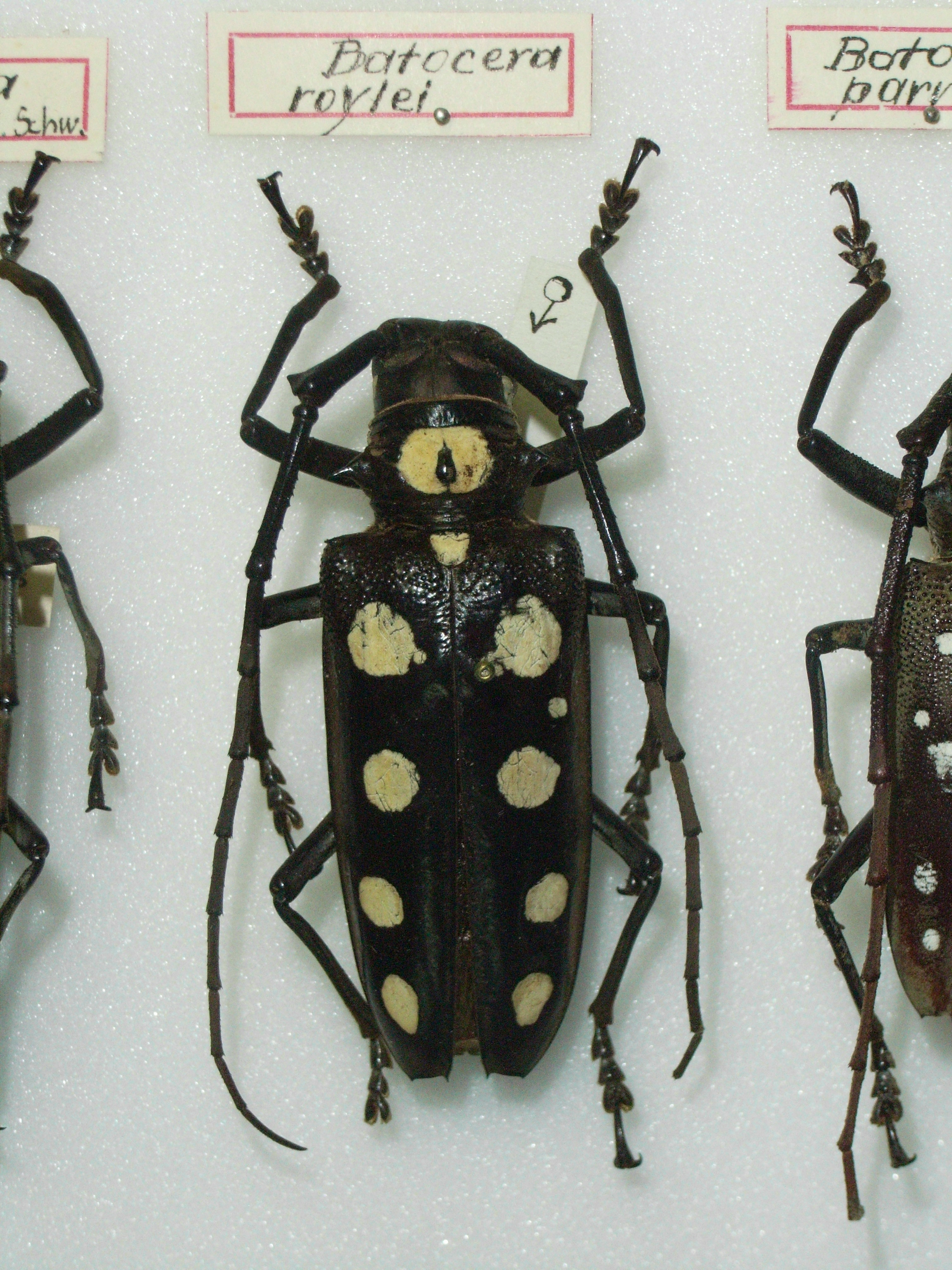

Scientific classification
- Kingdom: Animalia
- Phylum: Arthropoda
- Class: Insecta
- Order: Coleoptera
- Suborder: Polyphaga
- Infraorder: Cucujiformia
- Family: Cerambycidae
- Genus: Batocera
- Species: B. roylei

Binomial name
- Batocera roylei Hope, 1833

Synonyms
- Megacriodes ebeninus Snellen van Vollenhoven, 1871

= Batocera roylei =

Species of beetle

Batocera roylei is a species of beetle in the family Cerambycidae. It was described by Hope in 1833. It is known from Borneo, Malaysia, Vietnam, and India. It feeds on Mangifera indica.
