= Batocera forbesii =

Scientific classification
- Domain: Eukaryota
- Kingdom: Animalia
- Phylum: Arthropoda
- Class: Insecta
- Order: Coleoptera
- Suborder: Polyphaga
- Infraorder: Cucujiformia
- Family: Cerambycidae
- Genus: Batocera
- Species: B. forbesii

Binomial name
- Batocera forbesii (Waterhouse, 1881)

Synonyms
- Megacriodes forbesii Waterhouse, 1881; Megacriodes forbesi (Waterhouse) Aurivillius, 1921 (misspelling)

Species of beetle

Batocera forbesii is a species of beetle in the family Cerambycidae. It was described by Waterhouse in 1881. It is known from Sumatra.
