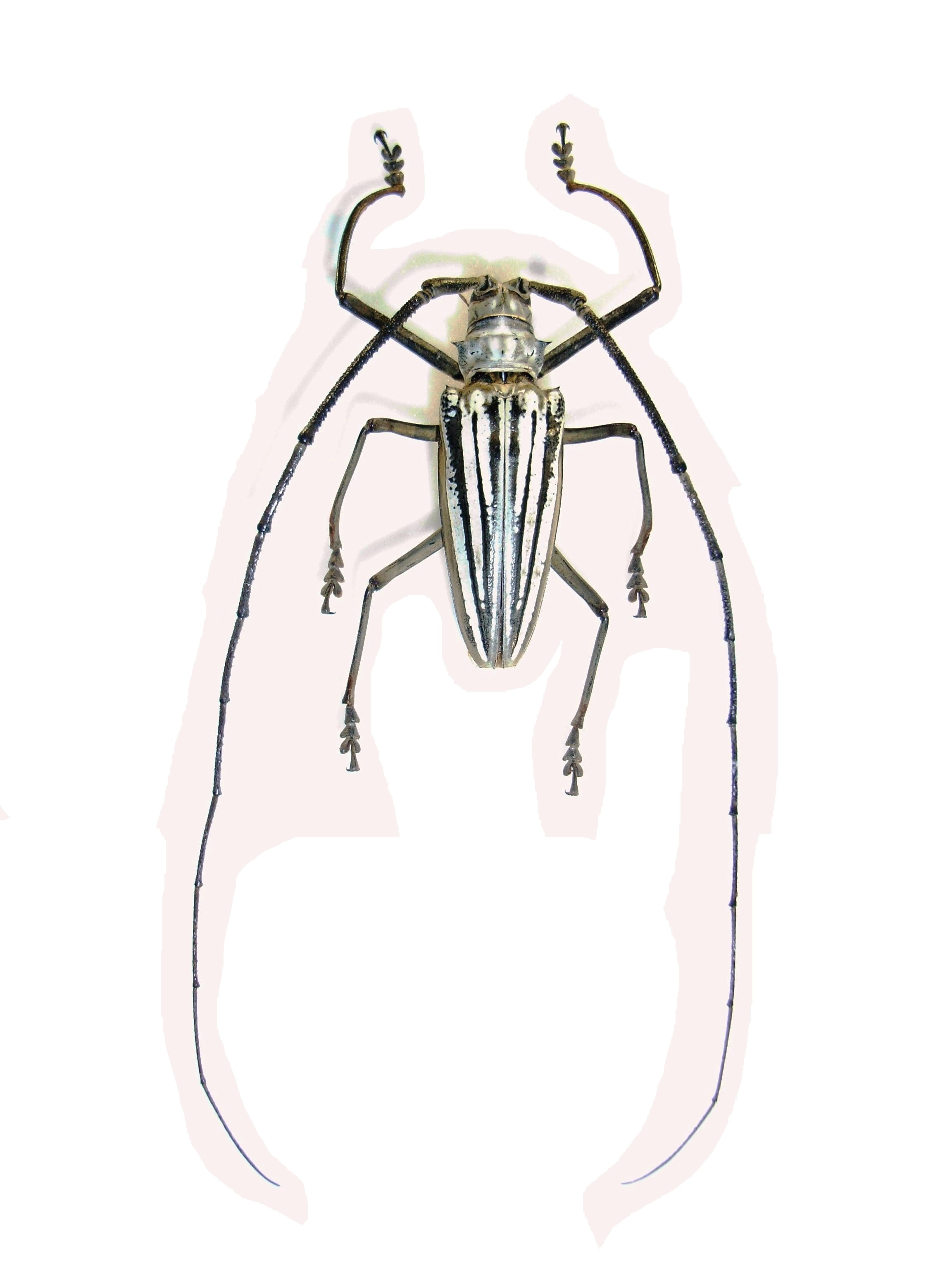

Scientific classification
- Domain: Eukaryota
- Kingdom: Animalia
- Phylum: Arthropoda
- Class: Insecta
- Order: Coleoptera
- Suborder: Polyphaga
- Infraorder: Cucujiformia
- Family: Cerambycidae
- Genus: Batocera
- Species: B. lamondi

Binomial name
- Batocera lamondi Rigout, 1987

= Batocera lamondi =

Species of beetle

Batocera lamondi is a species of beetle in the family Cerambycidae. It was described by Rigout in 1987. It is known from the Solomon Islands.
