= Batocera andamana =

Scientific classification
- Domain: Eukaryota
- Kingdom: Animalia
- Phylum: Arthropoda
- Class: Insecta
- Order: Coleoptera
- Suborder: Polyphaga
- Infraorder: Cucujiformia
- Family: Cerambycidae
- Genus: Batocera
- Species: B. andamana

Binomial name
- Batocera andamana Thomson, 1878

Synonyms
- Batocera rufomaculata var. andamana Khan, 1985

Species of beetle

Batocera andamana is a species of beetle in the family Cerambycidae. It was described by Thomson in 1878. It is known from the Andaman Islands, where it is very common.
