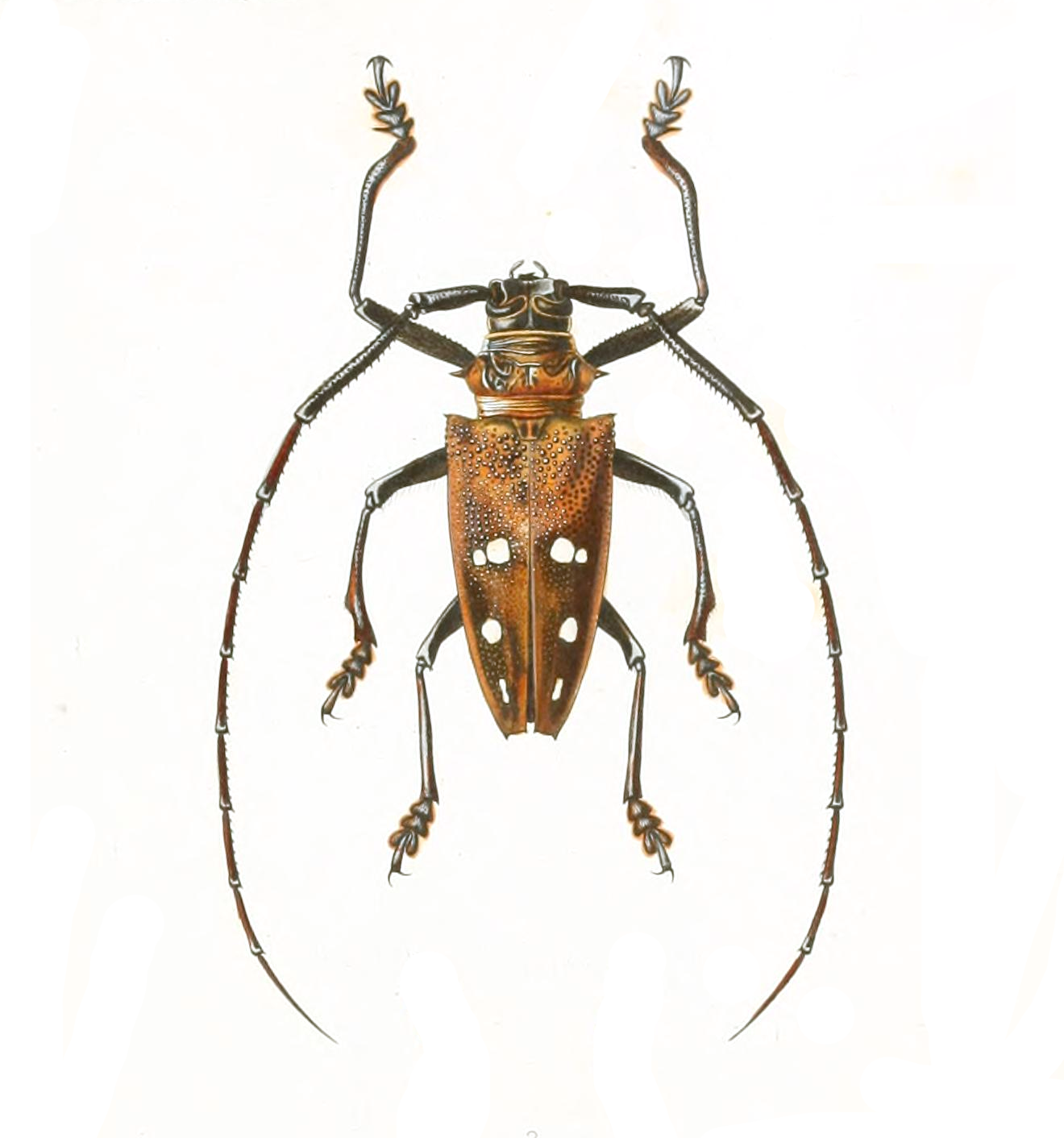

Scientific classification
- Kingdom: Animalia
- Phylum: Arthropoda
- Class: Insecta
- Order: Coleoptera
- Suborder: Polyphaga
- Infraorder: Cucujiformia
- Family: Cerambycidae
- Genus: Batocera
- Species: B. laena

Binomial name
- Batocera laena Thomson, 1858

Synonyms
- Batocera boisduvali laena Thomson, 1858

= Batocera laena =

Species of beetle

Batocera laena is a species of flat-faced longhorn beetle in the subfamily Lamiinae of the family Cerambycidae.

== Description ==
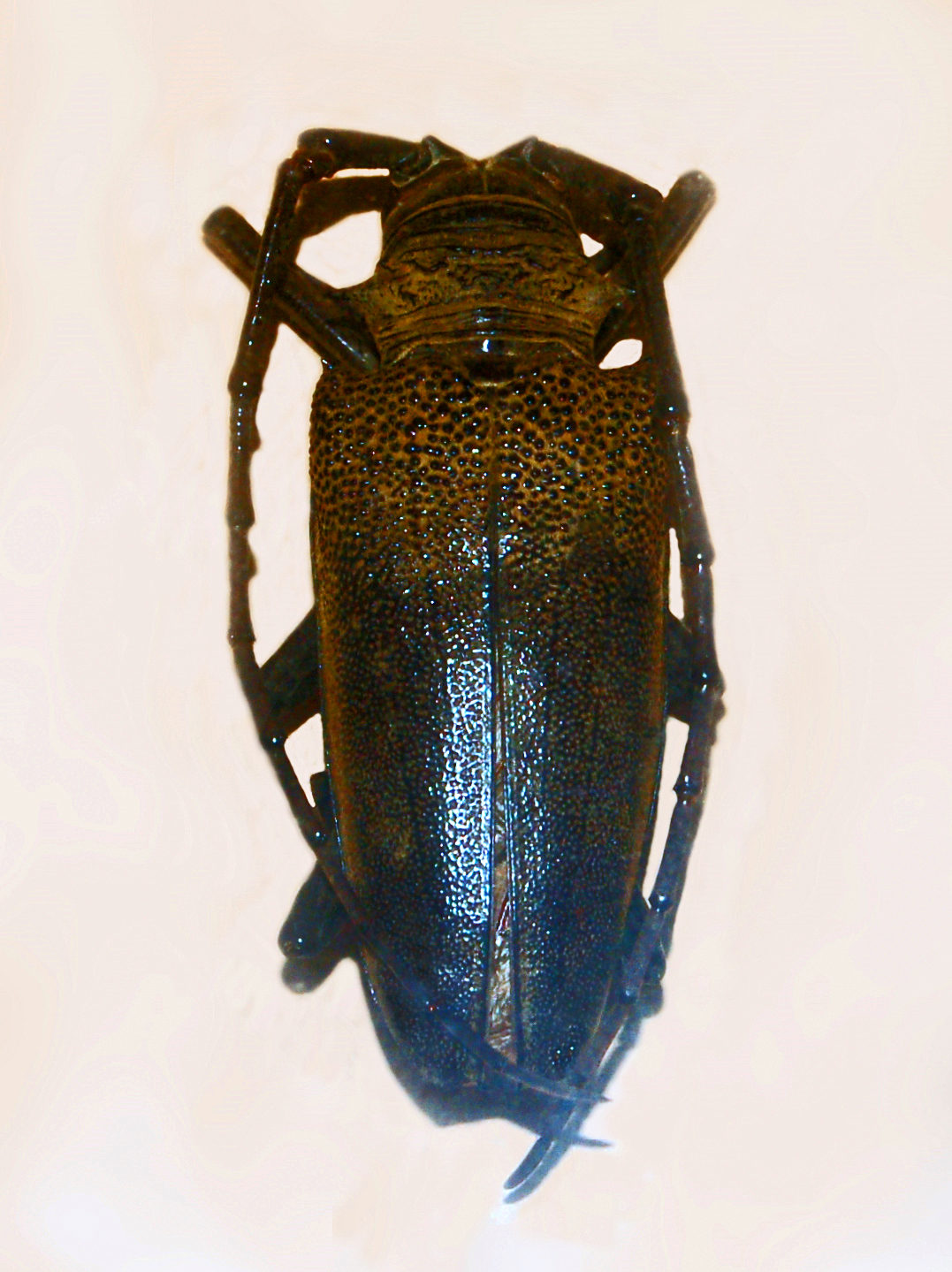
Batocera laena sappho from Australia

Batocera laena is a huge long-horn beetle reaching about 45–60 millimetres (1.8–2.4 in) of length. The length of the antenna may reach about 120 millimetres (4.7 in).

== Distribution ==
This species can be found in Australia (Queensland), Papua New Guinea, Moluccas (Key Islands and Aru Islands), New Britain.

== Subspecies ==
- Batocera laena gracilis Kriesche
- Batocera laena laena Thomson, 1858
- Batocera laena maculosa Schwarzer
- Batocera laena sappho Thomson, 1878
