= Batocera gigas =

Scientific classification
- Kingdom: Animalia
- Phylum: Arthropoda
- Clade: Pancrustacea
- Class: Insecta
- Order: Coleoptera
- Suborder: Polyphaga
- Infraorder: Cucujiformia
- Family: Cerambycidae
- Genus: Batocera
- Species: B. gigas

Binomial name
- Batocera gigas Drapiez, 1819

Synonyms
- Batocera gigantella Aurivillius, 1921; Batocera gigantella m. medioalbomaculata Breuning, 1947; Batocera tippmanni Breuning, 1954

Species of beetle

Batocera gigas is a species of beetle in the family Cerambycidae. It was described by Drapiez in 1819. It is known from Java, and is very common.
