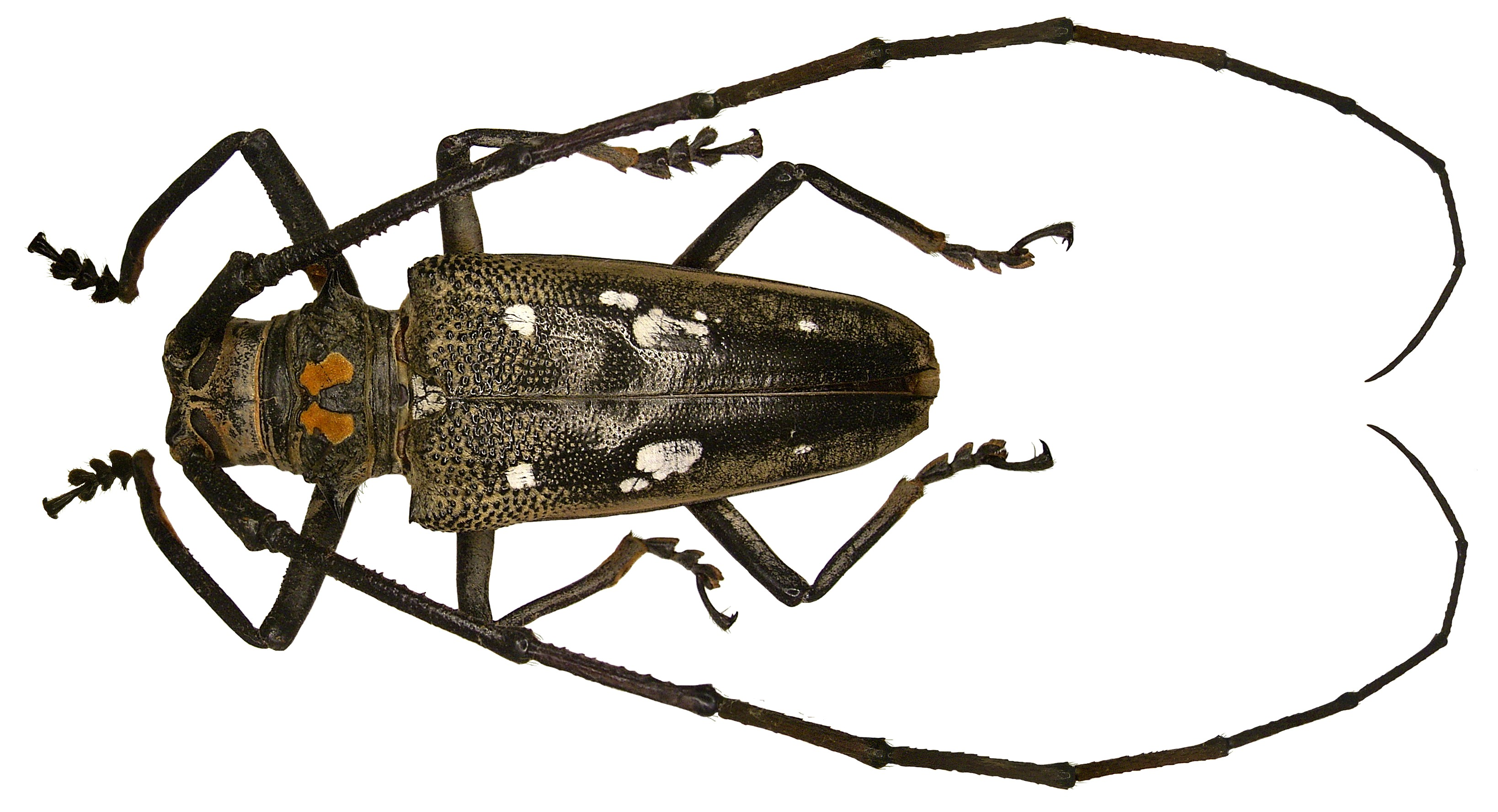

Scientific classification
- Kingdom: Animalia
- Phylum: Arthropoda
- Clade: Pancrustacea
- Class: Insecta
- Order: Coleoptera
- Suborder: Polyphaga
- Infraorder: Cucujiformia
- Family: Cerambycidae
- Genus: Batocera
- Species: B. celebiana

Binomial name
- Batocera celebiana Thomson, 1858

= Batocera celebiana =

Species of beetle

Batocera celebiana is a species of beetle in the family Cerambycidae. It was described by Thomson in 1858. It is known from Java, the Moluccas, and Sulawesi. It contains the subspecies Batocera celebiana pierrotae.

== Varieties ==
- Batocera celebiana var. biflavomaculata Breuning, 1950
- Batocera celebiana var. bivittata Breuning, 1950
- Batocera celebiana var. eurydice Thomson
- Batocera celebiana var. metallescens Pascoe
- Batocera celebiana var. tucana Kriesche
