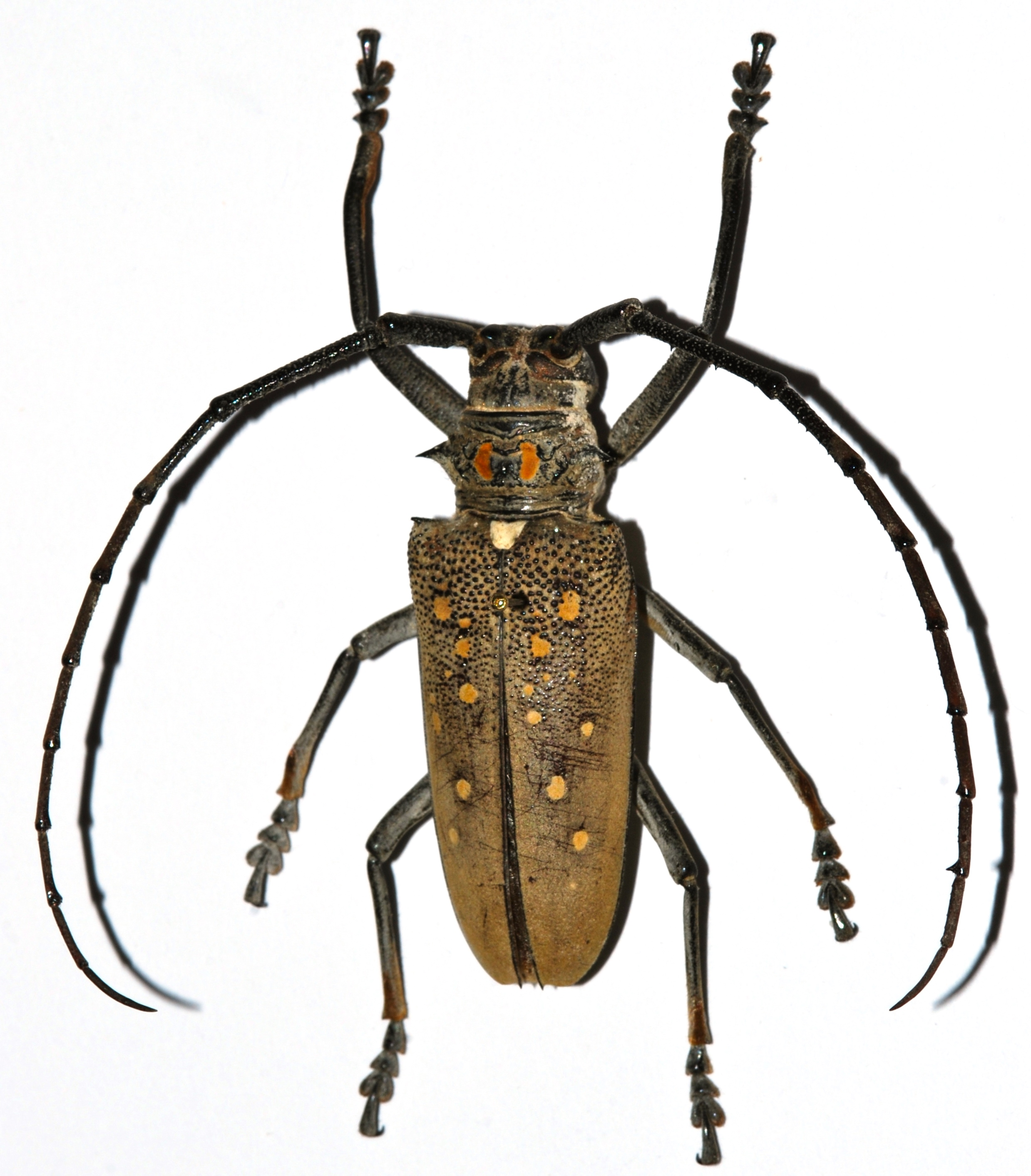
- Batocera rufomaculata

Scientific classification
- Kingdom: Animalia
- Phylum: Arthropoda
- Clade: Pancrustacea
- Class: Insecta
- Order: Coleoptera
- Suborder: Polyphaga
- Infraorder: Cucujiformia
- Family: Cerambycidae
- Tribe: Batocerini
- Genus: Batocera; Castelnau, 1840

Type species
- Cerambyx rubus (Linnaeus, 1758)

= Batocera =

Genus of beetles

Batocera is a genus of the family Cerambycidae, subfamily Lamiinae, close to the genus Rosenbergia.

== List of the described species with their distribution ==
- Batocera aeneonigra Thomson, 1859 New Guinea, Moluccas, Timor and Key Islands.
- Batocera ammiralis Breuning, 1947 Admiralty Islands.
- Batocera andamana Thomson, 1878 Andaman Islands. Common.
- Batocera armata (Olivier, 1800) Moluccas, New Guinea.
- Batocera boisduvali (Hope, 1839) Australia.
- Batocera breuningi Gilmour & Dibb, 1948 Vietnam. Very rare.
- Batocera browni Bates, 1877 New Hanover, New Ireland, Duke of York Island. Very rare.
- Batocera bruyni Lansborough, 1880 Sangihe.
- Batocera celebiana Thomson, 1858 Sulawesi (Celebes), Moluccas, Java, Sanihe. Very common.
- Batocera celebiana ssp. pierrotae Rigout, 1994
- Batocera cinnamonea Pascoe, 1866 Sula Islands.
- Batocera davidis Fairmaire, 1878 Formosa (Taiwan), China (Yunnan), Indochina.
- Batocera enganensis Gahan, 1907 Engano, Sumatra.
- Batocera forbesii (Waterhouse, 1881 Sumatra.
- Batocera frenchi Van de Poll, 1886 Australia: Queensland.
- Batocera gerstaeckerii Thomson, 1865 Sula Island.
- Batocera gigas Drapiez, 1819 Java. Very common.
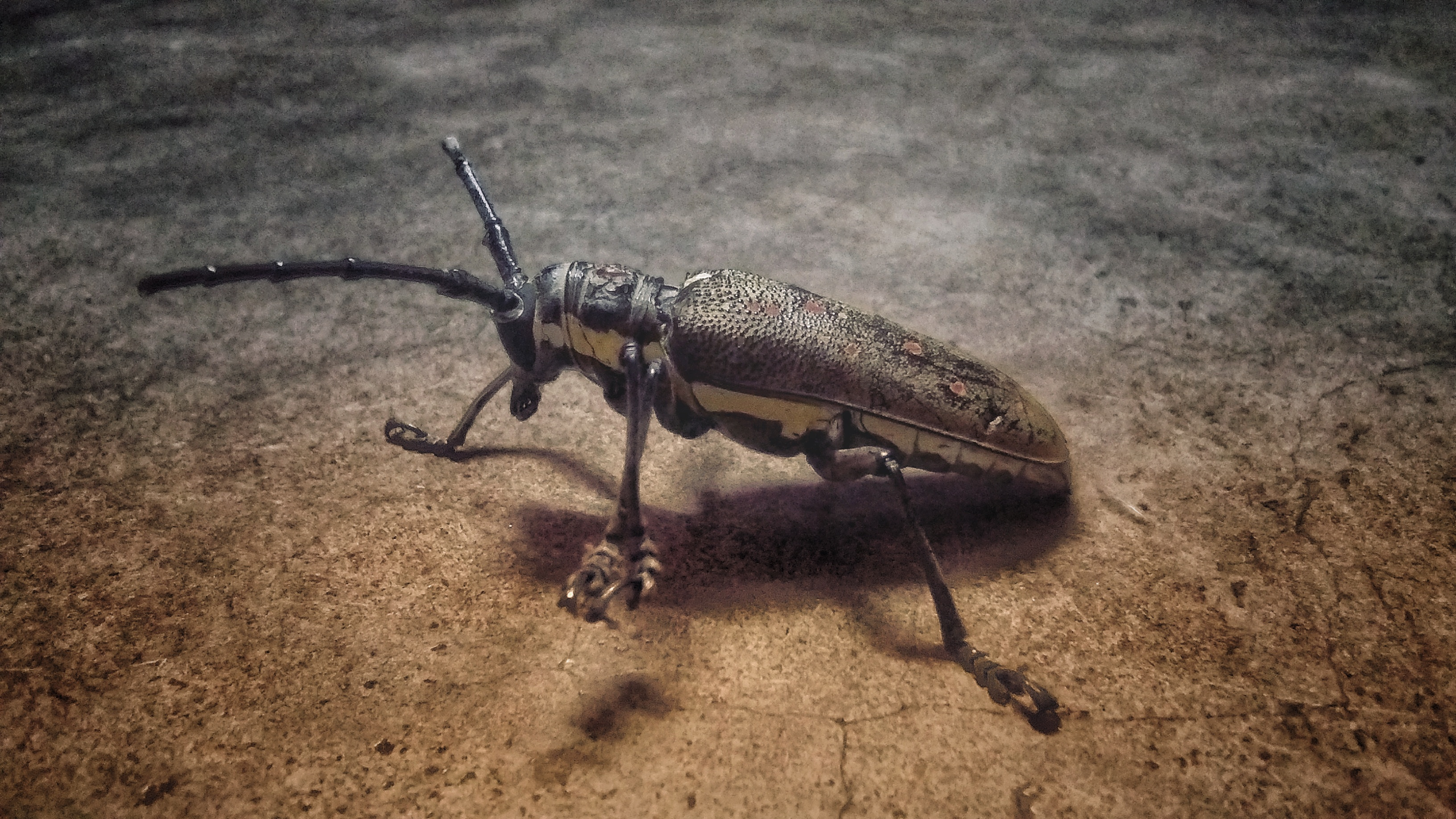
- Batocera rufomaculata moving on a floor
  Batocera herbuloti (Devecis, 1993) Borneo.
- Batocera hercules Boisduval, 1835 Celebes, Ambon, Java, Philippines.
- Batocera hlaveki Rigout, 1988 Maprik, New Guinea. Only some specimens known.
- Batocera horsfieldi (Hope, 1839) China, Himalayas.
- Batocera humeridens Thomson, 1859 Timor, Flores, Moa and Allor Islands.
- Batocera inconspicua Van de Poll, 1890 New Guinea, Solomon Islands: Bougainville, Guadalcanal.
- Batocera itzingeri (Breuning, 1942) Sumatra, Malaysia
- Batocera kibleri Schwarzer, 1925 Solomon Islands (Bougainville). Very common.
- Batocera laena Thomson, 1858 New Guinea, Key and Aru Islands, New Britain.
- Batocera lamondi Rigout, 1987 Malaita Island.
- Batocera lethuauti Schmitt & Le Thuaut, 2000 Sumba Island.
- Batocera lineolata Chevrolat, 1852 Japan, China. Very common.
- Batocera maculata (Schönherr, 1817) Thailand, Sumatra, Java, Borneo. Very common.
- Batocera magica Thomson, 1859 Java, Philippines. Common.
- Batocera malleti Schmitt, 2000 Laos.
- Batocera matzdorffi Kriesche 1915 New Guinea.
- Batocera migsominea Gilmour & Dibb, 1948 Indochina.
- Batocera molitor Kriesche, 1915 Eastern India, Indochina, Philippines, Java, Sumatra, Sulawesi. Very common.
- Batocera nebulosa Bates, 1877 Duke of York Island, New Britain, New Ireland.
- Batocera numitor Newman, 1842 Eastern India, Indochina, Philippines, Java, Sumatra, Sulawesi. Very common.
- Batocera oceanica Schwarzer, 1914 Palau Island (South Carolina Islands). rare.
- Batocera parryi (Hope, 1845) Himalayas, Indochina, Sumatra, Java, Borneo. Common.
- Batocera porioni Rigout, 1987 Solomon archipelago: Makira Island (San Cristobal).
- Batocera rosenbergi Kaup, 1866 Flores, Sumbawa, Lomblen.
- Batocera roylei Hope, 1833 Himalayas, Indochina, Sabah (Borneo)
- Batocera rubus (Linnaeus, 1758) India, China, Korea, Indochina, Malaysia, Sumatra, Java, Borneo, Philippines. Very common. Many varieties described
- Batocera rufomaculata (De Geer, 1775) West coast of Africa to India. Exists also in the West Indies, and also discovered in Syria. Very common.
- Batocera saundersii (Pascoe, 1866) Malaysia, Sumatra.

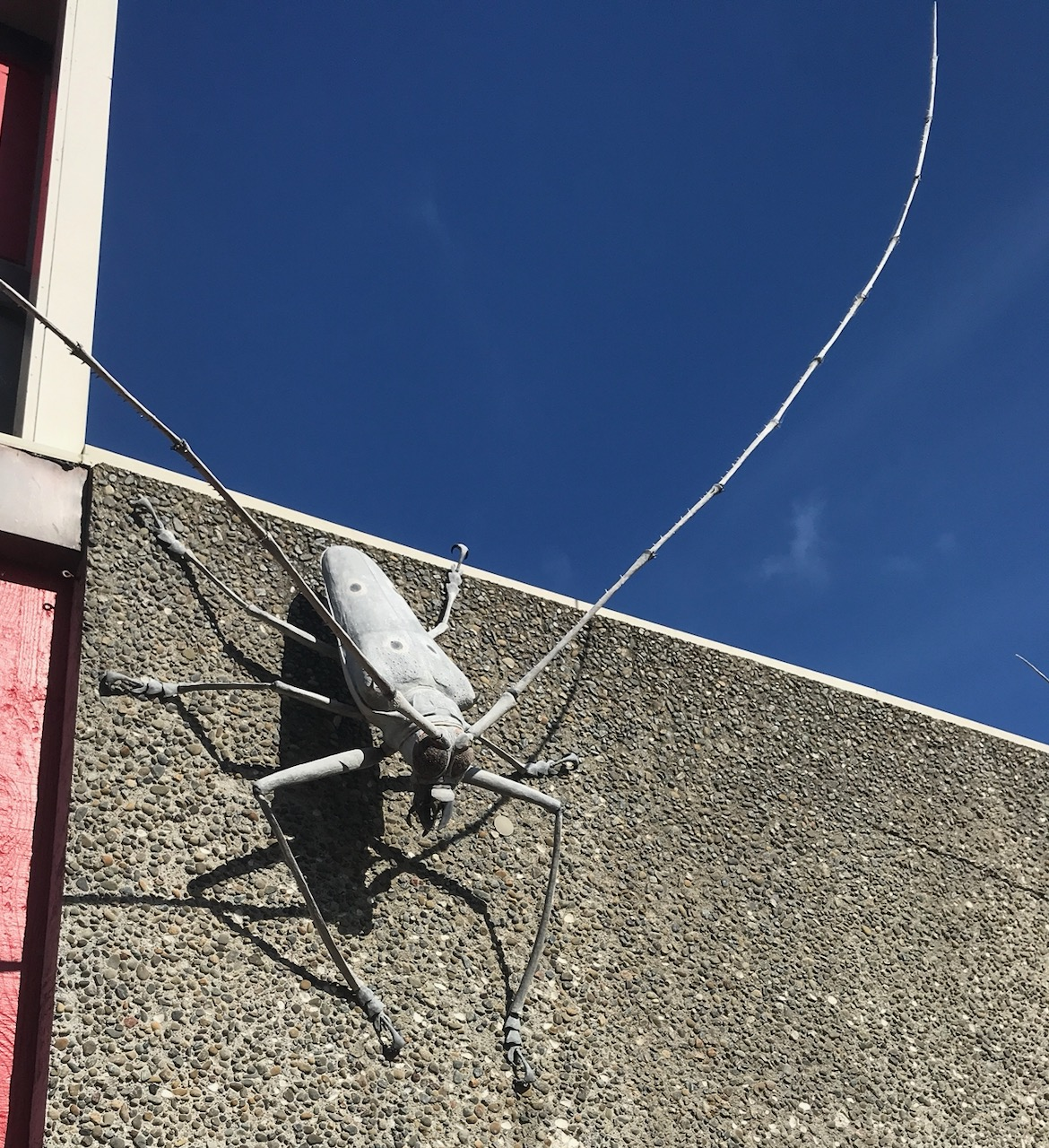
Part of Batocera Longhorns & Goliath (1996), by Elizabeth Thomson, mounted on the exterior of Te Manawa, Palmerston North, NZ

- Batocera strandi Breuning, 1954 Celebes (Tindano). Very rare.
- Batocera sumbaensis Franz, 1972 Sumba Island.
- Batocera thomsoni Javet, 1858 Malaysia, Java, Boeneo. Very common.
- Batocera timorlautensis Heller, 1897 Timorlaut Island. Very rare.
- Batocera una White, 1858 Vuana Lava (New Hebrides). Only three specimens known.
- Batocera ushijimai N. Ohbayashi, 1981 Taiwan.
- Batocera victoriana Thomson, 1856 Borneo, Sumatra, Indochina, Malaysia. Very common.
- Batocera wallacei Thomson, 1858 New Guinea, Aru Island, Key Island, Cape York. Very common.
- Batocera woodlarkiana Montrouzier, 1855 Woodlark Island. Rare.
- Batocera wyliei Chevrolat, 1858 Gabon, Congo (Zaïre), Cameroon, Angola, Guinea,
- Batocera wyliei ssp. granulipennis Breuning, 1948 Ivory Coast.

=== Species incertae sedis ===
- Batocera chevrolati Thomson, 1859
- Batocera claudia Pascoe, 1866
- Batocera drapiezi Aurivillius, 1922
- Batocera punctata Schwarzer, 1925
- Batocera sentis (Linnaeus, 1758)

== Bibliography ==
- Breuning (S. von), 1950 - Lamiaires nouveaux de la collection Lepesme, Longicornia, 1, pp. 518–519
- Gilmour (E. F.) & Dibb (J. R.), 1948 - Revision of the Batocerini (Col., Cerambycidae, Lamiinae), Spolia Zeylanica, 25(1), pp. 1–121, pl. 1-10
- Kriesche (R.), 1915 - Die Gattung Batocera Cast., Archiv für Naturgeschichte, 80, Abt. A, 11, pp. 111–150
- Rigout (J.), 1981 - The Beetles of the World, volume 1, Batocerini I, Sciences Nat, Venette
- Rigout (J.), 1982 - The Beetles of the World, volume 2, Batocerini II, Sciences Nat, Venette
- Rigout (J.), 1987, Description d'un nouveau Batocera, Bulletin de la Société des Sciences Naturelles, 54, p. 26
- Rigout (J.), 1987, Description d'un Batocera nouveau, Bulletin de la Société des Sciences Naturelles, 55, p. 10
- Perger (R.) & Vitali (F.), 2012, Revision of the genus Megacriodes Pascoe, 1866, a new synonym of Batocera Laporte de Castelnau, 1840 (Coleoptera, Cerambycidae, Lamiinae), Les Cahiers Magellanes (NS), 7, pp. 1–17, 31 figs.
