= Batocera punctata =

Scientific classification
- Domain: Eukaryota
- Kingdom: Animalia
- Phylum: Arthropoda
- Class: Insecta
- Order: Coleoptera
- Suborder: Polyphaga
- Infraorder: Cucujiformia
- Family: Cerambycidae
- Genus: Batocera
- Species: B. punctata

Binomial name
- Batocera punctata Schwarzer, 1925

Species of beetle

Batocera punctata is a species of beetle in the family Cerambycidae. It was described by Schwarzer in 1925. It is known from Taiwan.
