= Batocera hlaveki =

Scientific classification
- Domain: Eukaryota
- Kingdom: Animalia
- Phylum: Arthropoda
- Class: Insecta
- Order: Coleoptera
- Suborder: Polyphaga
- Infraorder: Cucujiformia
- Family: Cerambycidae
- Genus: Batocera
- Species: B. hlaveki

Binomial name
- Batocera hlaveki Rigout, 1988

Synonyms
- Batocera matzdorffi var. hlaveki Rigout, 1981

Species of beetle

Batocera hlaveki is a species of beetle in the family Cerambycidae. It was described by Rigout in 1988. It is present in Papua New Guinea.
