= Batocera frenchi =

Scientific classification
- Domain: Eukaryota
- Kingdom: Animalia
- Phylum: Arthropoda
- Class: Insecta
- Order: Coleoptera
- Suborder: Polyphaga
- Infraorder: Cucujiformia
- Family: Cerambycidae
- Genus: Batocera
- Species: B. frenchi

Binomial name
- Batocera frenchi Van de Poll, 1886

Synonyms
- Batocera laena var. frenchi (van der Poll) Gilmour & Dibb

Species of beetle

Batocera frenchi is a species of beetle in the family Cerambycidae. It was described by Van de Poll in 1886. It is known from Australia. Batocera frenchi is one of the species which caused the cane toad to be brought into Australia in June 1935.
