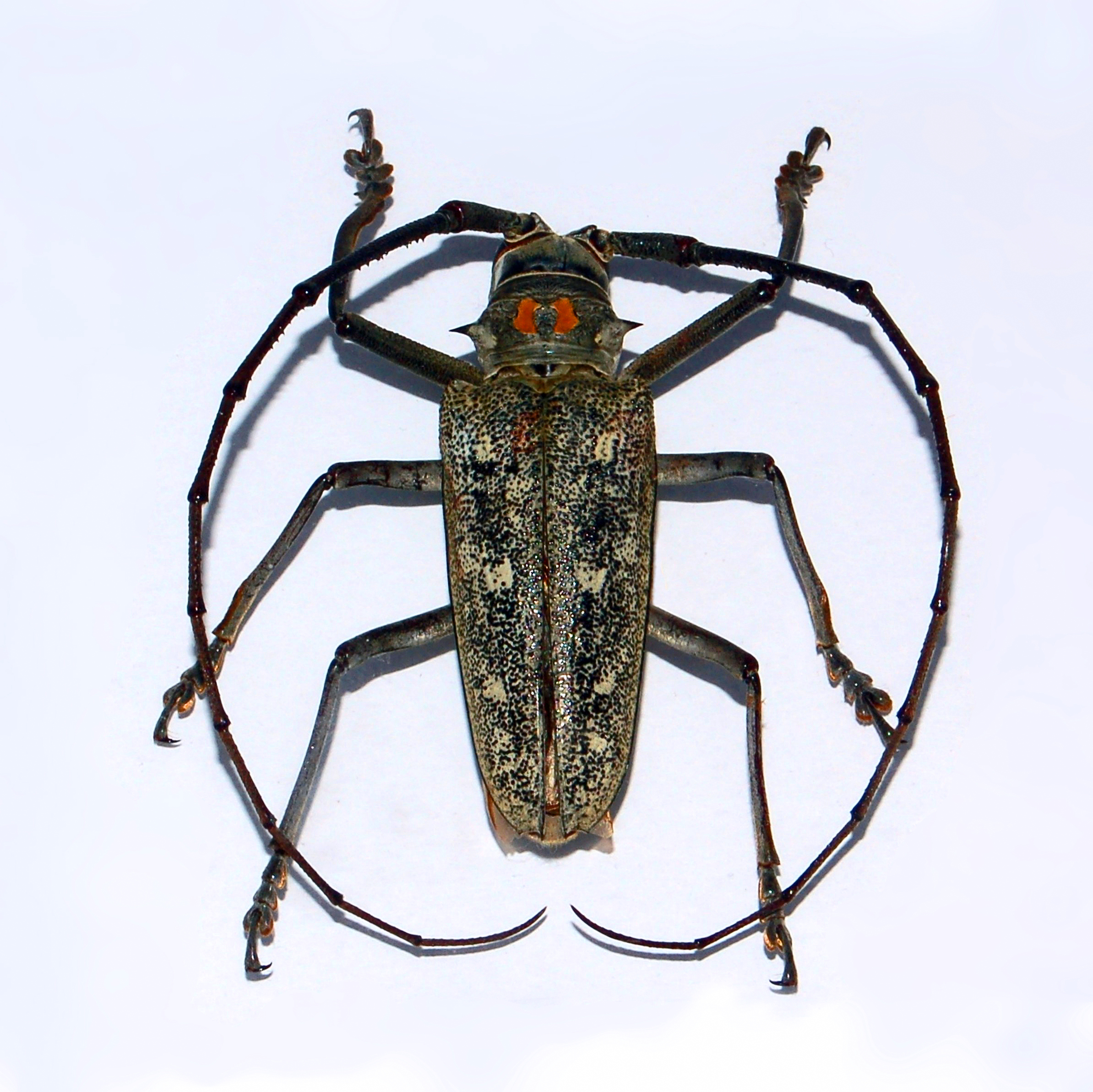

Scientific classification
- Kingdom: Animalia
- Phylum: Arthropoda
- Class: Insecta
- Order: Coleoptera
- Suborder: Polyphaga
- Infraorder: Cucujiformia
- Family: Cerambycidae
- Genus: Batocera
- Species: B. humeridens

Binomial name
- Batocera humeridens Thomson, 1859

Synonyms
- Batocera wieneckei Kaup, 1866

= Batocera humeridens =

Species of beetle

Batocera humeridens is a species of flat-faced longhorn beetle in the subfamily Lamiinae of the family Cerambycidae. It is found in Timor and nearby islands.

== Description ==
Batocera humeridens is a large flat-faced longhorn beetle reaching 45–60 millimetres (1.8–2.4 in) of length. The basic colour of the body is dark greyish with clearer greyish dorsal irregular spots on the elytra usually four on each elytron. Pronotum show two red depressions on both sides of the median line.

== Distribution ==
This species can be found in Timor, Flores and in some other islands south of Sulawesi (Moa and Allor Islands).
