= List of taxa published in Bulletin de la Société Sciences Nat =

The following is a list of the taxa described in the Bulletin de la Société Sciences Nat. The Bulletin de la Société Sciences Nat published 83 issues between 1972 and 1995.

== List of taxa ==
Taxon names are followed by the last names of the authors and the issue and page references. The publications dates are listed below.

=== Coleoptera (beetles) ===
- Acridoschema allardi Téocchi, 62, p. 26
- Acridoschema ligata tanzanicola Téocchi, 62, p. 26
- Actenodes aphrodite Bleuzen, 62, p. 11
- Actenodes biarti Bleuzen, 62, p. 9
- Actenodes brasiliensis Bleuzen, 62, p. 10
- Actenodes durantonorum Bleuzen, 62, p. 9
- Actenodes florencae Bleuzen, 62, p. 11
- Actenodes garleppi Bleuzen, 62, p. 12
- Actenodes hahlneli Bleuzen, 62, p. 11
- Actenodes hermes Bleuzen, 62, p. 11
- Actenodes lestradei Bleuzen, 62, p. 9
- Actenodes lestradei amazonensis Bleuzen, 62, p. 9
- Actenodes mars Bleuzen, 62, p. 10
- Actenodes mathani Bleuzen, 62, p. 11
- Actenodes minutus Bleuzen, 62, p. 10
- Actenodes mniszechi Bleuzen, 62, p. 10
- Actenodes muhlei Bleuzen, 62, p. 9
- Actenodes oberthuri Bleuzen, 62, p. 10
- Actenodes orvoeni Bleuzen, 62, p. 10
- Actenodes rugofrontalis Bleuzen, 62, p. 12
- Actenodes signatus mexicanus Bleuzen, 62, p. 10
- Actenodes staudingeri Bleuzen, 62, p. 11
- Actenodes subobscurus Bleuzen, 62, p. 10
- Actenodes venus Bleuzen, 62, p. 11
- Aderpas pauper unicolor Téocchi, 60, p. 27
- Aegus bisacutus Bomans & Bartolozzi, 63, p. 27
- Agestrata arnaudi Allard, 67, p. 24
- Agrilus rilliardi Baudon, 58, p. 27
- Allardiana Rigout, 82, p. 39
- Amaurodes passerini dukei Allard, 46, p. 16
- Amaurodes passerini natalensis Allard, 74, p. 11
- Analleucosma allardi Antoine, 64, p. 5
- Anochilia (Dysephicta) viossati Antoine, 75-76, p. 6
- Anristobia freneyi Schmitt, 75-76, p. 28
- Aparescus praecox ferreroi Téocchi, 64, p. 19
- Aphelorrhina bella insulanus Allard, 59, p. 26
- Aphelorrhina similima hecqi Allard, 43, p. 8
- Aphelorrhina tibialis adelphoides Allard, 43, p. 8
- Aphelorrhina tibialis collinsi Allard, 43, p. 8
- Apomecyna paraguttifera polyguttifera Téocchi, 71, p. 9
- Apoplesius Deuve, 66, p. 25
- Argyripa moroni Arnaud, 56, p. 27
- Argyripa porioni Arnaud, 56, p. 27
- Astraea (Astraea) alaini Antoine, 75-76, p. 30
- Astraea (Astraea) boudanti Antoine, 75-76, p. 30
- Astraea (Astraea) cartereti Arnaud, 53, p. 4
- Astraea (Astraea) dumasi Antoine, 75-76, p. 30
- Astraea (Astraea) miksici Antoine, 75-76, p. 30
- Astraea (Euglypta) lumawigi Arnaud, 56, p. 27 puis 66, p. 8
- Auriolus presidentialis ivorensis Téocchi, 72, p. 9
- Australognathus Chalumeau & Brochier, 79, p. 16
- Balesthoides guttipennis bonatoi Téocchi, 74, p. 12
- Batocera celebiana pierrotae Rigout, 82, p. 4
- Batocera lamondi Rigout, 54, p. 26
- Batocera porioni Rigout, 55, p. 10
- Beckius Dechambre, 75-76, p. 26
- Berningerus gorilloides Téocchi, 55, p. 26
- Biobesoides Téocchi, 72, p. 13
- Biobesoides pujoli Téocchi, 72, p. 13
- Biobesoides pujoli claricollis Téocchi, 72, p. 13
- Bomansodus Chalumeau & Brochier, 83, p. 20
- Callipogon (Orthomegas) fragosoi Bleuzen, 79, p. 19
- Callipogon (Orthomegas) haxairei Bleuzen, 79, p. 19
- Callipogon (Orthomegas) marechali Bleuzen, 79, p. 18
- Callipogon (Orthomegas) monnei Bleuzen, 79, p. 18
- Calodema bifasciata Sainval & Lander, 79, p. 7
- Calodema mariettae Lander, 79, p. 8
- Calodema micheleae Lamond & Werner, 83, p. 25
- Carabus (Acoptolabrus) businsky Deuve, 67, p. 2
- Carabus (Acoptolabrus) colasellus Deuve, 66, p. 26
- Carabus (Acoptolabrus) leechi auvrayorum Deuve, 77, p. 37
- Carabus (Acoptolabrus) leechi chonmasanensis Deuve, 80, p. 20
- Carabus (Acoptolabrus) leechi yooni Deuve, 67, p. 26
- Carabus (Acoptolabrus) mirabilissimus igniferescens Deuve, 74, p. 8
- Carabus (Acoptolabrus) schrenckii Deuve, 67, p. 28
- Carabus (Acoptolabrus) tonkinensis Deuve, 65, p. 26
- Carabus (Alipaster) bayanbulak Deuve, 79, p. 12
- Carabus (Alipaster) infantulus naraticus Deuve, 79, p. 13
- Carabus (Alipaster) pupulus dissimulatoides Deuve, 73, p. 26
- Carabus (Alipaster) pupulus inylchekensis Deuve, 69, p. 4
- Carabus (Alipaster) pupulus przewalskensis Deuve, 73, p. 24
- Carabus (Apoplesius) legrandi Deuve, 70, p. 20
- Carabus (Apotomopterus) arrowi tailoensis Deuve, 83, p. 34
- Carabus (Apotomopterus) bousquetianus Deuve, 82, p. 24
- Carabus (Apotomopterus) casaleianus Deuve, 80, p. 15
- Carabus (Apotomopterus) casaleianus thilliezi Deuve, 81, p. 33
- Carabus (Apotomopterus) delavayi habaensis Deuve, 75-76, p. 52
- Carabus (Apotomopterus) infirmior homodynamus Deuve, 82, p. 26
- Carabus (Apotomopterus) lamarcki Deuve, 82, p. 23
- Carabus (Apotomopterus) ngi Deuve, 82, p. 25
- Carabus (Apotomopterus) longeantennatus antaiensis Deuve, 82, p. 25
- Carabus (Apotomopterus) solidior parvielongatus Deuve, 82, p. 24
- Carabus (Apotomopterus) yuae arlequinus Deuve, 82, p. 25
- Carabus (Apotomopterus) yuanbaoensis Deuve, 82, p. 23
- Carabus (Apotomopterus) yunkaicus fageticola Deuve, 82, p. 26
- Carabus (Aulonocarabus) koreanus kwonileeique Deuve, 73, p. 18
- Carabus (Aulonocarabus) marcilhaci Deuve, 75-76, p. 52
- Carabus (Aulonocarabus) vogtianus horvatovichi Deuve, 74, p. 7
- Carabus (Axinocarabus) fedtschenkoi kugitangensis Deuve, 80, p. 23
- Carabus (Calocarabus) gratus nishidai Deuve, 80, p. 23
- Carabus (Calocarabus) linxiaensis Deuve, 75-76, p. 55
- Carabus (Calocarabus) linxiaensis pseudogratus Deuve, 82, p. 32
- Carabus (Carabus) arvensis jurgitae Deuve, 78, p. 5
- Carabus (Carabus) dongchuanicus Deuve, 82, p. 28
- Carabus (Carabus) giacomazzoi Deuve, 73, p. 17
- Carabus (Carabus) manifestus paeninsularis Deuve, 73, p. 17
- Carabus (Carabus) nanpingens Deuve, 73, p. 22
- Carabus (Carabus) pseudolatipennis wenxianensis Deuve, 75-76, p. 52
- Carabus (Carabus) stenbergi ronkayi Deuve, 74, p. 7
- Carabus (Carabus) yunnanus oblongior Deuve, 75-76, p. 52
- Carabus (Carabus) yunnanus pseudoyunnanus Deuve, 80, p. 16
- Carabus (Chrysocarabus) auronitens auronitens auverloti Thibaudeau, 40, p. 2
- Carabus (Chrysocarabus) auronitens auronitens rubicundosus Branger, 52, p. 3
- Carabus (Chrysocarabus) auronitens auronitens thumseri Thibaudeau, 40, p. 2
- Carabus (Chrysocarabus) auronitens festivus cyanonigrescens Devecis, 69, p. 18
- Carabus (Chrysocarabus) auronitens subfestivus coatlochensis Branger, 52, p. 4
- Carabus (Chrysocarabus) auronitens subfestivus igneus Branger, 52, p. 3
- Carabus (Chrysocarabus) auronitens subfestivus nigrescens Branger, 52, p. 3
- Carabus (Chrysocarabus) lineatus lateralis leonensis Brañes, 47, p. 6
- Carabus (Chrysocarabus) lineatus lateralis sanabriensis Brañes, 47, p. 5
- Carabus (Chrysocarabus) lineatus lateralis subsalmanyinus Brañes, 47, p. 6
- Carabus (Chrysotribax) hispanus retaudis Gorrin, 73, p. 16
- Carabus (Chrysotribax) rutilans helenais Mollard, 75-76, p. 25
- Carabus (Chrysotribax) rutilans jeannei lassalei Brañes, 47, p. 7
- Carabus (Coptolabrus) ignimetallus ngyukmingi Deuve, 69, p. 6
- Carabus (Coptolabrus) ishizukai Deuve & Ohshima, 63, p. 8
- Carabus (Coptolabrus) kubani Deuve, 67, p. 1
- Carabus (Coptolabrus) pustulifer guizhouensis Deuve, 82, p. 32
- Carabus (Coptolabrus) smaragdinus dolichognathus Deuve, 83, p. 34
- Carabus (Cratocarabus) kryzkanovskii grumulifer Deuve, 79, p. 13
- Carabus (Cratocarabus) kryzkanovskii laevimolossulus Deuve, 79, p. 13
- Carabus (Cratocarabus) kryzkanovskii molossulus Deuve, 79, p. 13
- Carabus (Cratocechenus) akinini buffi Deuve & Kaláb, 74, p. 10
- Carabus (Cratocechenus) akinini severovi Deuve, 74, p. 7
- Carabus (Cratocechenus) ovtchinnikovi kafkai Deuve, 81, p. 33
- Carabus (Cyclocarabus) martynovi pseudokaratavensis Deuve, 80, p. 23
- Carabus (Cyclocarabus) sidzhakensis Deuve, 69, p. 4
- Carabus (Cyclocarabus) uzbek Deuve & Kaláb, 74, p. 9
- Carabus (Diocarabus) kolymensis viridicupreior Deuve, 77, p. 37
- Carabus (Eocechenus) mouthiezianoides Deuve & Kaláb, 75-76, p. 61
- Carabus (Eotribax) malkovskyi erenhebergaensis Deuve, 79, p. 14
- Carabus (Eotribax) foreli rueckbeilianus Deuve, 80, p. 18
- Carabus (Eotribax) reperiendus Deuve, 73, p. 24
- Carabus (Eotribax) siniaevi Deuve, 80, p. 18
- Carabus (Eotribax) talgarensis Deuve, 70, p. 13
- Carabus (Eucarabus) deyrollei chloromorphus Brañes, 47, p. 7
- Carabus (Eucarabus) deyrollei cyaneomorphus Brañes, 47, p. 7
- Carabus (Eucarabus) deyrollei goryi Brañes, 47, p. 7
- Carabus (Eucarabus) deyrollei miniresplendens Brañes, 47, p. 7
- Carabus (Eucarabus) deyrollei neotristis Brañes, 47, p. 7
- Carabus (Eucarabus) deyrollei pecoudi Brañes, 47, p. 7
- Carabus (Eucarabus) deyrollei splendidulus Brañes, 47, p. 7
- Carabus (Eucarabus) gossarei venustoides Deuve, 65, p. 26
- Carabus (Eucarabus) kolymensis magadamensis Deuve, 72, p. 22
- Carabus (Eucarabus) parvicornis Deuve, 64, p. 14
- Carabus (Eucarabus) vinokurovi Deuve, 72, p. 21
- Carabus (Eucarabus) vinokurovi tsylbulskii Deuve, 72, p. 21
- Carabus (Goniocarabus) grombczewskii crassec ostulatus Deuve, 70, p. 18
- Carabus (Goniocarabus) grombczewskii mikhailovianus Deuve & Dolin, 78, p. 10
- Carabus (Heterocarabus) marietti charetianus Auvray, 74, p. 20
- Carabus (Ischnocarabus) tenuitarsis auvrayi Charet, 74, p. 21
- Carabus (Isiocarabus) dreuxi Deuve, 82, p. 26
- Carabus (Isiocarabus) kiukiangensis alzonai Deuve, 66, p. 25
- Carabus (Isiocarabus) kiukiangensis pustululatus Deuve, 79, p. 9
- Carabus (Isiocarabus) pustululatus Deuve, 82, p. 27
- Carabus (Lamprostus) hemprichi cheikhermonensis Deuve, 73, p. 26
- Carabus (Lamprostus) jitkae ehdenensis Deuve, 73, p. 27
- Carabus (Lamprostus) rabaroni dominici Thomé, 54, p. 23
- Carabus (Lamprostus) rabaroni rigouti Basquin & Darge, 52, p. 20
- Carabus (Lamprostus) syrus cheikensis Deuve, 73, p. 26
- Carabus (Lamprostus) syrus saidaensis Deuve, 73, p. 26
- Carabus (Lamprostus) torosus reynieri Charet, 74, p. 21
- Carabus (Leptocarabus) nangnimicus pukwonensis Deuve, 77, p. 37
- Carabus (Leptocarabus) nangnimicus pukwonensis Deuve, 77, p. 37
- Carabus (Leptoplesius) dolini Deuve, 73, p. 24
- Carabus (Leptoplesius) kirgisiensis juzai Deuve, 73, p. 22
- Carabus (Leptoplesius) kirgisiensis sarydiazensis Deuve, 73, p. 24
- Carabus (Leptoplesius) marquardti longioripes Deuve, 79, p. 14
- Carabus (Leptoplesius) marquardti problematicior Deuve, 80, p. 18
- Carabus (Leptoplesius) merzbacheri khotanensis sarydiazensis Deuve, 73, p. 24
- Carabus (Leptoplesius) nivium lanzhouicus Deuve, 61, p. 23
- Carabus (Leptoplesius) shokalskii kuqaensis Deuve, 80, p. 17
- Carabus (Macrothorax) rugosus baeticus pseudobaeticus Brañes, 47, p. 6
- Carabus (Macrothorax) rugosus branni semicyanescens Brañes, 47, p. 6
- Carabus (Meganebrius) aianstivelli Morvan, 29-30, p. 15
- Carabus (Meganebrius) tamang probsti Deuve, 70, p. 18
- Carabus (Megodontus) bonvouloiri casalei Cavazzuti, p. 50, p. 6
- Carabus (Megodontus) purpurascens monnayensis Branger, 52, p. 4
- Carabus (Megodontus) taliensis atentsensis Deuve, 66, p. 26
- Carabus (Megodontus) taliensis lijiangensis Deuve, 67, p. 2
- Carabus (Megodontus) taliensis weibaoensis Deuve, 75-76, p. 58
- Carabus (Megodontus) taliensis xueshanicola Deuve, 75-76, p. 59
- Carabus (Megodontus) yulongxuensis Deuve, 67, p. 2
- Carabus (Morphocarabus) latreilli pyonganensis Deuve & Li, 81, p. 34
- Carabus (Morphocarabus) monilis amoenus lavagni Lavagne & Fleurent, 82, p. 39
- Carabus (Morphocarabus) monilis monilis vincentianus Devecis, 70, p. 25
- Carabus (Morphocarabus) molinis roseyanus Dufour, 15, p. 14
- Carabus (Ohomopterus) battoniensis Deuve, 69, p. 3
- Carabus (Ohomopterus) ohshimaorum Deuve, 69, p. 3
- Carabus (Ophiocarabus) kalabellus Deuve, 79, p. 10
- Carabus (Ophiocarabus) politus naratensis Deuve, 79, p. 10
- Carabus (Ophiocarabus) rufocuprescens chormaensis Deuve, 80, p. 17
- Carabus (Oreocarabus) cribatus negreianus Deuve, 80, p. 17
- Carabus (Oreocarabus) guadarramus guadarramus sagranus Brañes, 47, p. 5
- Carabus (Oreocarabus) porrectangulus ispiriacus Deuve, 78, p. 7
- Carabus (Oreocarabus) titanus corpulentior Deuve, 66, p. 25
- Carabus (Pagocarabus) krali Deuve, 82, p. 31
- Carabus (Pagocarabus) lama daochengensis Deuve, 82, p. 31
- Carabus (Pagocarabus) lama derongensis Deuve, 82, p. 31
- Carabus (Pagocarabus) lama yajiangensis Deuve, 82, p. 31
- Carabus (Pagocarabus) nanschanicus nocticolor Deuve & Kaláb, 75-76, p. 62
- Carabus (Procerus) cerkes Basquin & Darge, 52, p. 21
- Carabus (Procerus) scabrosus weidneri Lassalle, 63, p. 3
- Carabus (Pseudocranion) alpherakii mugeko Deuve, 73, p. 18
- Carabus (Pseudocranion) bruggeianus Deuve, 73, p. 20
- Carabus (Pseudocranion) budha meditabundus Deuve, 73, p. 21
- Carabus (Pseudocranion) dilacerans Deuve, 75-76, p. 56
- Carabus (Pseudocranion) gansuensis labrangicus Deuve, 75-76, p. 56
- Carabus (Pseudocranion) gansuensis luhuoensis Deuve, 82, p. 32
- Carabus (Pseudocranion) gansuensis viatorum Deuve, 75-76, p. 56
- Carabus (Pseudocranion) tagongensis Deuve, 73, p. 18
- Carabus (Pseudocranion) tiro gerardchareti Deuve, 79, p. 12
- Carabus (Rhigocarabus) alpherakii budha Deuve, 79, p. 11
- Carabus (Rhigocarabus) alpherakii chareti Deuve, 79, p. 11
- Carabus (Rhigocarabus) brezinai Deuve, 82, p. 30
- Carabus (Rhigocarabus) jiulongensis Deuve, 82, p. 29
- Carabus (Rhigocarabus) pusio hylonomus Deuve, 73, p. 17
- Carabus (Rhigocarabus) laevithorax pecoudianus Deuve, 73, p. 17
- Carabus (Rhigocarabus) subindigestus Deuve, 82, p. 30
- Carabus (Rhigocarabus) tewoensis Deuve, 75-76, p. 54
- Carabus (Rhigocarabus) turnai Deuve, 82, p. 28
- Carabus (Rhigocarabus) xiangchengicus Deuve, 79, p. 10
- Carabus (Rhigocarabus) xiei barkamensis Deuve, 82, p. 30
- Carabus (Sphodristocarabus) armenianicus sarikamisensis Cavazzuti, p. 50, p. 4
- Carabus (Sphodristocarabus) gilnickii brunneicupreus Deuve, 80, p. 20
- Carabus (Sphodristocarabus) macrogonus azaleae Cavazzuti, p. 50, p. 3
- Carabus (Sphodristocarabus) macrogonus giresunensis Deuve, 75-76, p. 55
- Carabus (Tomocarabus) rumelicus kurdistanicola Deuve, 64, p. 15
- Carabus (Tomocarabus) simardianus Deuve, 64, p. 14
- Carabus (Trachycarabus) hemicalosoma gonbadensis Deuve, 69, p. 4
- Carabus (Tribax) puschkini kabacaensis Machard, 74, p. 21
- Ceroglossus darwini caburgansis Deuve, 64, p. 14
- Ceroglossus darwini jirouxi Deuve, 83, p. 11
- Chariesthes nobilis septempunctata Téocchi, 57, p. 17
- Cheirotonus chiangdaoensis Minet, 53, p. 3
- Chelorrhina kraatzi marlenae Rousset, 64, p. 22
- Chiasornithodus Chalumeau & Brochier, 83, p. 20
- Chrysobothris joellae Bleuzen, 77, p. 35
- Chrysochroa akiyamai Bleuzen, 64, p. 2
- Chrysochroa blairi Bleuzen, 64, p. 2
- Clerota rodriguezi Arnaud, 46, p. 18
- Clinteroides lachaumei Antoine, 75-76, p. 14
- Coelodera miksici Antoine, 49, p. 18
- Coelorrhina babaulti Allard, 36, p. 5
- Coelorrhina hornimanni lerui Allard, 78, p. 4
- Coelorrhina hornimanni nathaliae Allard, 59, p. 26
- Coelorrhina hornimanni vingerhoedti Allard, 78, p. 5
- Coelorrhina loricata ruandana Allard, 36, p. 3
- Coelorrhina ruficeps collinsi Allard, 36, p. 4
- Coelorrhina ruficeps elgonensis Allard, 36, p. 4
- Coelorrhina ruteri Allard, 36, p. 5
- Coptomia viossati Antoine, 75-76, p. 7
- Coptomiopsis viossati Antoine, 75-76, p. 7
- Coryphocera khooi Arnaud, 64, p. 23
- Cosmiophaena minor sylvatica Antoine, 54, p. 20
- Cychrus angustitarsalis Deuve, 70, p. 17
- Cychrus barkamensis Deuve, 72, p. 20
- Cychrus barkamensis siguniangensis Deuve, 80, p. 21
- Cychrus bispinosus wuduensis Deuve, 80, p. 21
- Cychrus bruggei Deuve, 70, p. 17
- Cychrus chareti Deuve, 80, p. 20
- Cychrus chareti shankoucola Deuve, 82, p. 32
- Cychrus colasi Deuve, 80, p. 21
- Cychrus furumii mauxi Deuve, 69, p. 6
- Cychrus kubani Deuve, 75-76, p. 60
- Cychrus luhuo Deuve, 82, p. 33
- Cychrus marcilhaci Deuve, 75-76, p. 59
- Cychrus mugecuo Deuve, 80, p. 21
- Cychrus pratti sabdensis Deuve, 82, p. 33
- Cychrus roeschkei jiulongensis Deuve, 82, p. 33
- Cychrus turnai Deuve, 82, p. 33
- Cychrus yulongxuicus Deuve, 67, p. 3
- Cychropsis bousqueti Deuve, 72, p. 19
- Cyclocephala bleuzeni Dechambre, 83, p. 12
- Cyclocephala pardolocarnoi Dechambre, 83, p. 12
- Cyclocephala sylviae Dechambre, 83, p. 13
- Cyclommatus martinii Lacroix, 61, p. 25
- Cyclommatus monguillonni Lacroix 29-30, p. 55
- Cyclommatus strigiceps ipseni Lacroix, 59, p. 6
- Cyclommatus tittoni Lacroix 38, p. 6
- Cymatura holonigra longipilis Téocchi, 63, p. 12
- Cymatura spumans intermedia Téocchi, 74, p. 13
- Daedycorrhina donckieri pallida Allard, 68, p. 23
- Daedycorrhina rigouti flavipennis Allard, 68, p. 23
- Daedycorrhina rondoensis Allard, 58, p. 17
- Daedycorrhina songeana Allard, 58, p. 17
- Dichostates compactus namibianus Téocchi, 74, p. 14
- Discopeltis bellula cinctipennis Antoine, 79, p. 23
- Dynastes hercules paschoali Grossi & Arnaud, 78, p. 13
- Dyspilophora trivittata insularis Allard, 74, p. 11
- Ecyroschema tuberculata hecphora Téocchi, 57, p. 20
- Embrikiola simulans gabonica Bleuzen, 67, p. 8
- Eudicella gralli thiryi Allard, 78, p. 5
- Eudicella immaculata quadrimaculata Allard, 78, p. 4
- Eudicella intermedia Allard, 47, p. 2
- Eudicella woermanni nathaliae Allard, 59, p. 26
- Eunidia allardi koczkai Téocchi, 64, p. 20
- Eunidia fuscostictica evansi Téocchi, 60, p. 26
- Eunidia nigrosignata marinii Téocchi, 64, p. 20
- Eunidia ochreomarmorata pallida Téocchi, 60, p. 25
- Eunidia tubericollis latefasciata Téocchi, 74, p. 13
- Eupatorus koletta Voirin, 19, p. 6
- Euselates delponti Antoine, 56, p. 22
- Euselates neglecta Antoine, 49, p. 18
- Euselates perroti Antoine, 64, p. 9
- Euselates virgata pauliani Antoine, 49, p. 18
- Falsapomecyna mourgliae Téocchi, 57, p. 18
- Figulus angustus Bomans, 63, p. 15
- Figulus bicolor Bomans, 51, p. 10
- Figulus boileaui Bomans, 51, p. 10
- Figulus cavifrons Bomans, 53, p. 6
- Figulus crupsinus Bomans, 53, p. 9
- Figulus deletus Bomans, 63, p. 18
- Figulus delicatus Bomans, 52, p. 11
- Figulus elateroides Bomans, 51, p. 10
- Figulus excavatus Bomans, 52, p. 11
- Figulus exquisitus Bomans, 53, p. 6
- Figulus fulgens Bomans, 52, p. 8
- Figulus granulosus Bomans, 51, p. 11
- Figulus hornabrooki Bomans, 52, p. 12
- Figulus incertus Bomans, 53, p. 5
- Figulus incisus Bomans, 52, p. 7
- Figulus insolitus Bomans, 53, p. 10
- Figulus insulanus Bomans, 52, p. 7
- Figulus joliveti Bomans, 51, p. 11
- Figulus kinabaluensis Bomans, 53, p. 13
- Figulus laevithorax Bomans, 53, p. 6
- Figulus laoticus Bomans, 51, p. 11
- Figulus meridianus Bomans, 51, p. 12
- Figulus orientalis Bomans, 63, p. 19
- Figulus parallelicanthus Bomans, 63, p. 17
- Figulus parvus Bomans, 53, p. 10
- Figulus piceus Bomans, 63, p. 15
- Figulus planifrons Bomans, 53, p. 6
- Figulus popei Bomans, 52, p. 8
- Figulus porrectus Bomans, 63, p. 18
- Figulus powelli Bomans, 51, p. 12
- Figulus praecipus Bomans, 53, p. 10
- Figulus procericornis Bomans, 53, p. 13
- Figulus punctifrons Bomans, 53, p. 9
- Figulus quasisimils Bomans, 63, p. 16
- Figulus robustus Bomans, 52, p. 8
- Figulus rubripes Bomans, 53, p. 5
- Figulus sarawakensis Bomans, 53, p. 9
- Figulus similis Bomans, 53, p. 5
- Figulus spinosus Bomans, 52, p. 8
- Figulus splendens Bomans, 52, p. 11
- Figulus tapinus Bomans, 52, p. 7
- Figulus tubericollis Bomans, 63, p. 16
- Figulus tumidimentum Bomans, 63, p. 18
- Figulus venustus Bomans, 63, p. 16
- Figulus weinreichei Bomans, 51, p. 15
- Figulus wittmeri Bomans & Lacroix, 61, p. 24
- Freocoroides Téocchi, 72, p. 12
- Freocoroides copei Téocchi, 72, p. 12
- Genyodonta laeviplaga insularis Allard, 74, p. 11
- Genyodonta laeviplaga perflavoapicalis Allard, 74, p. 11
- Genyodonta lequeuxi insulana Allard, 78, p. 5
- Genyodonta palliata collinsi Allard, 78, p. 5
- Genyodonta palliata werneri Allard, 78, p. 4
- Glycyphana (Glycyphaniola) allardi Antoine, 75-76, p. 10
- Glycyphana (Glycyphaniola) chamnongi Antoine, 69, p. 12
- Glycyphana (Glycyphaniola) malayensis ornata Antoine, 69, p. 12
- Gnathocarabus Deuve, 69, p. 4
- Gnathocera pauliani Allard, 60, p. 9
- Gnorimus octopunctatus flavopilosus Devecis, 74, p. 2
- Gnorimus octopunctatus hyperalba Devecis, 74, p. 2
- Goliathopsis duponti Antoine, 69, p. 10
- Goliathopsis ferreroi Antoine, 69, p. 10
- Heteropseudinca lequeuxi Legrand, 77, p. 34
- Hemiprotaetia boudanti Antoine, 75-76, p. 29
- Hexarthrius nigritus Lacroix, 65, 12
- Howdenypa Arnaud, 78, p. 28
- Homothyrea cinctipennis werneri Antoine, 79, p. 26
- Imaibiodes Deuve, 70, p. 20
- Ischnia okuensis miredoxa Téocchi, 60, p. 18
- Ischnostoma coetzeri Allard, 51, p. 25
- Ixorida (Aurelia) allardi Antoine, 82, p. 8
- Ixorida (Ixorida) florenti Arnaud, 62, p. 1
- Ixorida (Ixorida) heinrichi Antoine, 49, p. 11
- Ixorida (Mecinonota) chuai Antoine, 69, p. 16
- Ixorida (Mecinonota) decorata Antoine, 49, p. 11
- Ixorida (Mecinonota) inornata Antoine, 49, p. 12
- Ixorida (Mecinonota) kinabaluensis Antoine, 49, p. 11
- Ixorida (Mecinonota) luctuosa Antoine, 49, p. 12
- Ixorida (Mecinonota) nagaii Antoine, 75-76, p. 18
- Ixorida (Mecinonota) pseudoregia Antoine, 49, p. 14
- Ixorida (Mecinonota) pseudoregia borneensis Antoine, 49, p. 14
- Ixorida (Mecinonota) pseudoregia malayensis Antoine, 49, p. 14
- Ixorida (Mecinonota) regia allardi Antoine, 64, p. 9
- Ixorida (Mecinonota) regia siberutensis Antoine, 49, p. 14
- Ixorida (Mecinonota) sabatieri Antoine, 82, p. 10
- Ixorida (Mecinonota) salomonica tulagiensis Antoine, 49, p. 16
- Ixorida (Mecinonota) venera siamensis Antoine, 49, p. 15
- Ixorida (Pseudomecinonota) acutipennis Antoine, 49, p. 14
- Ixorida (Pseudomecinonota) confusa Antoine, 75-76, p. 18
- Ixorida (Pseudomecinonota) gueyraudi Antoine, 75-76, p. 18
- Ixorida (Pseudomecinonota) gueyraudiana Antoine, 75-76, p. 19
- Jumnos ferreroiminettique Antoine, 72, p. 18
- Kerochariesthes Téocchi, 64, p. 19
- Leucocellis coerulescens erythraeana Antoine, 79, p. 25
- Lucanus ritae Lacroix, 40, p. 10
- Macrodontia cambeforti Bleuzen, 67, p. 9
- Macrodontia marechali Bleuzen, 67, p. 9
- Mausoleopsis amabilis ruteri Antoine, 64, p. 8
- Megacriodes albinicans Devecis, 66, p. 18
- Megacriodes herbuloti Devecis, 79, p. 27
- Megalorrhina harrisi eximioides Allard, 59, p. 26
- Megalorrhina harrisi leptofurcosa Allard, 47, p. 1
- Megalorrhina taverniersi Allard, 66, p. 21
- Melinesthes jocquei Allard, 60, p. 12
- Melinesthes lequeuxi Allard, 60, p. 12
- Melinesthes murphyi Allard, 60, p. 12
- Metaxymorpha imitator Sainval, 81, p. 23
- Metaxymorpha nigrosuturalis Sainval & Lander, 79, p. 8
- Metaxymorpha regale blairi Sainval & Lander, 81, p. 24
- Mycteristes (Cephalocosmus) minettii Antoine, 69, p. 14
- Obera discoidalis togoensis Téocchi, 74, p. 15
- Neofreocorus Téocchi, 58, p. 18
- Neofreocorus novaki Téocchi, 58, p. 18
- Neolucanus zebra Lacroix, 59, p. 5
- Nigidius cartereti Bomans & Bartolozzi, 72, p. 5
- Nigidius inouei Bomans & Bartolozzi, 72, p. 7
- Nigracoptolabrus Deuve, 70, p. 18
- Nitocris delecta rufoscapula Téocchi, 64, p. 21
- Nitocris juvenca capinera Téocchi, 64, p. 21
- Nitocris microphtalma rossii Téocchi, 74, p. 15
- Nyctopais jordani balteata Téocchi, 60, p. 25
- Obereopsis obscuritarsis infuscatus Téocchi, 64, p. 22
- Odontolabis femoralis palawanicus Lacroix, 65, 13
- Oncosterna celebensis nigripilosa Antoine, 75-76, p. 19
- Oncosterna friderici thiburcei Antoine, 75-76, p. 19
- Ontochariestes Téocchi, 74, p. 12
- Oxythyrea (Acheilosis) canui Antoine, 58, p. 19
- Oxythyrea (Acheilosis) decellei Antoine, 53, p. 18
- Oxythyrea (Acheilosis) fuscoaenea Antoine, 53, p. 16
- Oxythyrea (Acheilosis) intermedia Antoine, 53, p. 16
- Oxythyrea (Acheilosis) maraisi Antoine, 56, p. 22
- Oxythyrea (Acheilosis) pauliani Antoine, 53, p. 18
- Oxythyrea (Acheilosis) septicollis Antoine, 53, p. 17
- Oxythyrea congoensis Antoine, 75-76, p. 12
- Oxythyrea pouillaudei Antoine, 58, p. 20
- Oxythyrea triliturata basilewskyi Antoine, 75-76, p. 14
- Oxythyrea viossati Antoine, 58, p. 19
- Pachnoda ardoini lydiae Rigout, 53, p. 27
- Pachnoda arrowi cludtsi Rigout, 50, p. 2
- Pachnoda arrowi kivuensis Rigout, 50, p. 2
- Pachnoda berliozi Rigout, 24, p. 2
- Pachnoda chireyi Legrand, 77, p. 34
- Pachnoda collinsi Rigout, 46, p. 5
- Pachnoda concolor schuerhoffi Rigout, 43, p. 2
- Pachnoda cordata camerounensis Rigout, 44 p. 13
- Pachnoda cordata dahomeyana Rigout, 46, p. 5
- Pachnoda dargei Rigout, 53, p. 27
- Pachnoda dechambrei Rigout, 50, p. 1
- Pachnoda demoulini Rigout, 17, p. 2
- Pachnoda collinsi Rigout, 46, p. 5
- Pachnoda fromenti Rigout, 29-30, p. 52
- Pachnoda hilaroides Rigout, 43, p. 2
- Pachnoda leclercqi Rigout, 46, p. 4
- Pachnoda leclercqi nigricans Rigout, 46, p. 4
- Pachnoda lequeuxi Rigout, 21, p. 11
- Pachnoda lerui Rigout, 64, p. 18
- Pachnoda madgei Rigout, 83, p. 8
- Pachnoda marginata murielae Rigout, 53, p. 27
- Pachnoda nutricia Rigout, 26, p. 15
- Pachnoda onorei Rigout, 26, p. 17
- Pachnoda poggei bourgeati Rigout, 26, p. 18
- Pachnoda praecellens mateui Rigout, 26, p. 15
- Pachnoda praecellens nigrescens Rigout, 26, p. 15
- Pachnoda rougemonti Rigout, 43, p. 3
- Pachnoda sinuata nicolae Rigout, 53, p. 28
- Pachnoda trimaculata turlini Rigout, 21, p. 10
- Pachnoda trimaculata turlini immaculata Rigout, 21, p. 11
- Pachnoda trimaculata turlini separata Rigout, 21, p. 11
- Pachnoda watulegei Rigout, 29-30, p. 52
- Panglaphyra bougainvillei Allard, 61, p. 3
- Panglaphyra lamondi Allard, 61, p. 3
- Panglaphyra robusta Allard, 61, p. 3
- Paraleucosma Antoine, 64, p. 4
- Paraleucosma glycuphanoides dives Antoine, 64, p. 5
- Paraphloeus scortecci eytreensis Téocchi, 74, p. 14
- Parepixanthis gueyraudi Antoine, 82, p. 5
- Paraplagiomus tragiscoides sexplagiata Téocchi, 63, p. 10
- Phaedimus howdeni Arnaud, 53, p. 4
- Phaedimus lumawigi Arnaud, 64, p. 25
- Phytoecia (Blepisanis) sublateralis rubroscapa Téocchi, 63, p. 12
- Plaesiorrhina watkinsiana kolbeii Allard, 78, p. 4
- Planodema bimaculata rhomphae Téocchi, 57, p. 19
- Platygeniops guttatus Ricchiardi, 77, p. 8
- Platynocephalus arnaudi Delpont, 83, p. 31
- Platynocephalus miyashitai Delpont, 83, p. 31
- Plectrone malvari Antoine, 75-76, p. 31
- Plectrone romeoi Arnaud, 56, p. 27
- Pleuronota allardi Antoine, 67, p. 26
- Pleuronota chuai Antoine, 67, p. 26
- Pleuronota lumawigi Arnaud, 66, p. 8
- Plusiotis dzidorhum Arnaud, 82, p. 36
- Poimenesperus dobrai reducta Téocchi, 78, p. 38
- Polyphylla (Granida) jessopi Wailly, 80, p. 12
- Polyphylla (Granida) nikodymi Wailly, 80, p. 13
- Potosia fieberi barilloti Devecis, 74, p. 3
- Potosia fieberi dumasi Devecis, 74, p. 3
- Prosopocera (Alphitopola) allardi Téocchi, 79, p. 29
- Prosopocera (Alphitopola) forchhammeriana maculicollis Téocchi, 60, p. 8
- Prosopocera (Alphitopola) gracillima mourgliai Téocchi, 79, p. 29
- Prosopocera (Alphitopola) gracillima werneri Téocchi, 79, p. 29
- Prosopocera (Alphitopola) pyrgopolynica brunneipennis Téocchi, 60, p. 7
- Prosopocera (Alphitopola) pyrgopolynica lunulata Téocchi, 60, p. 7
- Prosopocera (Alphitopola) subocellata nigrocellata Téocchi, 72, p. 10
- Prosopocera (Paralphitopola) maculosa formosa Téocchi, 72, p. 10
- Prosopocoelus chalcoides Lacroix & Ratti, 38, p. 2
- Prosopocoelus erberi Lacroix, 57, p. 8
- Prosopocoelus fabricei Lacroix, 57, p. 10
- Prosopocoelus francisi Arnaud, 53, p. 4
- Prosopocoelus gertrudae Arnaud & Lacroix, 69, p. 25
- Prosopocoelus ipseni Lacroix, 57, p. 12
- Prosopocoelus khooi Lacroix, 38, p. 2
- Prosopocoelus marioni Arnaud & Lacroix, 69, p. 25
- Prosopocoelus romeoi Lacroix & Taroni, 38, p. 3
- Prosopocoelus taroni Lacroix & Ratti, 38, p. 4
- Prosopocoelus vittatus francisi Arnaud & Lacroix, 69, p. 25
- Prosopocoelus zebra ledae Lacroix & Taroni, 38, p. 5
- Protaetia (Euprotaetia) gertrudae Arnaud, 64, p. 3
- Protaetia (Euprotaetia) lumawigi Arnaud, 53, p. 4
- Protaetia (Euprotaetia) teisseyrei Arnaud, 64, p. 24
- Protaetia (Euprotaetia) uhligi Arnaud, 53, p. 4
- Protaetia (Liocola) chicheryi Antoine, 69, p. 11
- Protaetia (Pachyprotaetia) chaminadei Antoine, 69, p. 11
- Protaetia (Poecilophana) audreyae Arnaud, 64, p. 23
- Protaetia (Potosia) paulianiana Antoine, 64, p. 6
- Protaetia (Protaetia) allardi Antoine, 82, p. 6
- Protaetia (Protaetia) antoinei Arnaud, 64, p. 24
- Protaetia (Protaetia) boudanti Antoine, 75-76, p. 29
- Protaetia (Protaetia) boulleti Arnaud, 62, p. 1
- Protaetia (Protaetia) francisi Arnaud, 62, p. 2
- Protaetia (Protaetia) gueyraudi Antoine, 82, p. 6
- Protaetia (Protaetia) ismaeli Arnaud, 56, p. 27
- Protaetia (Protaetia) johani Antoine, 75-76, p. 30
- Protaetia (Protaetia) miksici Arnaud, 53, p. 4 (nomen preoc.)
- Protaetia (Protaetia) pavicevici Antoine, 75-76, p. 29
- Protaetia (Macroprotetia) milani Antoine, 82, p. 13
- Pseudochalcotheomima allardi Antoine, 68, p. 6
- Pseudochalcotheomima compacta Antoine, 68, p. 6
- Pseudochariestes arrowi murphyi Téocchi, 63, p. 9
- Pseudochariestes francoisi decempunctata Téocchi, 68, p. 27 (and 74, p. 13)
- Pseudochariestes picta ruahae Téocchi, 72, p. 9
- Pseudochariestes tricolor trichroma Téocchi, 68, p. 27
- Pseudolucanus deuvei Lacroix, 57, p. 7
- Pseudolucanus wittmeri Lacroix, 40, 7
- Pseudoheterophana Allard, 68, p. 22
- Pseudoheterophana canui Allard, 68, p. 22
- Pseudotephraea ancilla canui Antoine, 75-76, p. 12
- Pterostichus keltiekus Morvan, 29-30, p. 15
- Pterostichus pseudoharmandi Morvan, 29-30, p. 16
- Pterotragula Téocchi, 72, p. 11
- Rosenbergia breuningi Rigout, 34, p. 1
- Rosenbergia chicheryi Rigout, 28, p. 22
- Rosenbergia drouini Rigout, 75-76, p. 78
- Rosenbergia erhmanae Rigout, 42, p. 14
- Rosenbergia freneyi Rigout, 58, p. 4
- Rosenbergia hlaveki Rigout, 75-76, p. 78
- Rosenbergia hoyoisi Rigout, 75-76, p. 78
- Rosenbergia lislei Rigout, 28, p. 21
- Rosenbergia lislei noeli Rigout, 29-30, p. 20
- Rosenbergia schmitti Rigout, 28, p. 22
- Rosenbergia schneideri Rigout, 82, p. 4
- Sarathropezus conicipennis allardi Téocchi, 62, p. 26
- Serrognathus coifaisi Lacroix, 40, p. 13
- Serrognathus lumawigorum Arnaud & Lacroix, 69, p. 25
- Serrognathus moinieri Lacroix, 40, p. 16
- Serrognathus titanus palawanicus Lacroix, 40, p. 17
- Smaragdesthes conjux cedrici Allard, 59, p. 27
- Sophronica ikutensis latefasciata Téocchi, 72, p. 14
- Sophronica suturalis unicolor Téocchi, 72, p. 14
- Sophronica vittata Téocchi, 70, p. 28
- Sphaenognathinus Chalumeau & Brochier, 83, p. 20
- Sphaenognathus cartereti Lacroix, 56, 11
- Sphaenognathus furumii Lacroix, 65, 11
- Sphaenognathus lachaumei Lacroix, 40, 5
- Sphaenognathus leoni Lacroix, 40, 7
- Sphaenognathus rotundatus Lacroix, 56, 12
- Sphaenognathus subtilis Lacroix, 56, 13
- Spinocentruropsis Minet, 55, p. 21
- Spinocentruropsis papuanus Minet, 55, p. 21
- Stephanocrates dohertyi namangensis Allard, 46, p. 17
- Stephanocrates kiellandi Allard, 46, p. 16
- Stephanorrhina guttata insularis Allard, 59, p. 26
- Stephanorrhina isabellae Allard, 67, p. 23
- Stephanorrhina princeps bamptoni Allard, 43, p. 7
- Stephanorrhina princeps kigonsera Allard, 43, p. 7
- Stenauxa fasciata anterufa Téocchi, 72, p. 11
- Sternoplus chicheryiana Antoine, 75-76, p. 10
- Sternotomis bohemanni scholtzi Téocchi, 57, p. 17
- Sternotomis itzingeri viridiana Téocchi, 74, p. 13
- Strategus monguilloni Voirin, 21, p. 9
- Taeniesthes collinsi Allard, 74, p. 11
- Tetradia lophoptera postalba Téocchi, 72, p. 14
- Thaumastopeus rubyi Arnaud, 46, p. 18
- Thylactus kinduensis ferreroi Téocchi, 63, p. 12
- Tmesorrhina alpestris bafutensis Darge, 59, p. 25
- Tmesorrhina garnieri Allard, 78, p. 4
- Tmesorrhina laeta pseudotridens Allard, 78, p. 4
- Tmesorrhina latea oilosipes Allard, 59, p. 27
- Tmesorrhina lequeuxi Antoine, 83, p. 27
- Tmesorrhina simillima viridipes Allard, 59, p. 27
- Tragocephala mima bopprei Téocchi, 74, p. 13
- Tragocephala mista minettii Téocchi, 72, p. 9
- Tragocephala mnizechi dargei Téocchi, 64, p. 20
- Tragocephala variegata bellamyi Téocchi, 72, p. 9
- Trichius lianae Ricchiardi, 77, p. 5
- Trichius obscurus Ricchiardi, 77, p. 6
- Typocaeta kenyana Téocchi, 72, p. 11
- Uloptera canui Antoine, 75-76, p. 16
- Zographus oculator conjuctus Téocchi, 57, p. 18

=== Lepidoptera (butterflies and moths) ===
- Acraea kia Pierre, 68, p. 1
- Adelotypa aminias wia Brévignon & Gallard, 73, p. 6
- Adelotypa balista augustalis Brévignon, 77, p. 24
- Adelpha celerio florea Brévignon, 83, p. 17
- Adelpha epione galbao Brévignon, 83, p. 17
- Adelpha gilletta Brévignon, 83, p. 17
- Agrias claudina sardanapalus paganinii Späth, 75-76, p. 42
- Agrias narcissus tapajonus kersteini Späth, 75-76, p. 39
- Agrias narcissus tapajonus werneri Späth, 75-76, p. 39
- Agrias phalcidon fournierae mariettae Späth, 75-76, p. 39
- Anaea titan romeroi Descimon, 58, p. 16
- Anteros aurigans Gallard & Brévignon, 63, p. 5
- Bonagota Razowski, 52, p. 22
- Callicore cyllene lalannensis Brévignon, 83, p. 16
- Calospila rhodope wayanai Brévignon, 77, p. 24
- Charaxes ansorgei simoni Turlin, 53, p. 19
- Charaxes brutus roberti Turlin, 53, p. 20
- Charaxes eudoxus boersmana Plantrou, 26, p. 12
- Charaxes lucyae gabriellae Turlin, 54, p. 7
- Charaxes druceanus brazza Turlin, 53, p. 23
- Charaxes galleyanus Darge & Minig, 44, p. 7
- Charaxes kheili caeruleolinea Basquin & Turlin, 52, p. 2
- Charaxes kheili curvilinea Basquin & Turlin, 52, p. 1
- Charaxes kheili flavimaculata Basquin & Turlin, 52, p. 2
- Charaxes matakall Darge, 47, p. 9
- Charaxes matakall collinsianus Darge, 47, p. 13
- Charaxes matakall fabiennae Darge, 47, p. 13
- Charaxes matakall franceoisixavieri Darge, 47, p. 13
- Charaxes matakall smaragdaliformis Darge, 47, p. 13
- Charaxes nicati Canu, 72, p. 22
- Charaxes pembanus coelestissima Turlin, 53, p. 24
- Charaxes pleione delvauxi Turlin, 53, p. 21
- Charaxes teissieri Darge & Minig, 44, p. 7
- Charaxes viossati Canu, 72, p. 22
- Charaxes zoolina mafugensis kivu Turlin, 25, p. 16
- Charaxes zoolina mafugensis winka Turlin, 25, p. 16
- Coelonia mauritii nigrescens Basquin, 75-76, p. 47
- Delias bouyssoui Schmitt, 75-76, p. 69
- Delias dollyae Schmitt, 75-76, p. 68
- Delias festone Schmitt, 75-76, p. 71
- Delias giseleae Schmitt, 75-76, p. 69
- Delias ibelana roepkei Schmitt, 75-76, p. 70
- Delias jordani Schmitt, 75-76, p. 71
- Dynaminae pebana elisa Brévignon, 83, p. 16
- Enantia aloikea Brévignon, 77, p. 17
- Esthemopsis crystallina Brévignon & Gallard, 73, p. 4
- Eupithecia anamnesa Herbulot, 81, p. 21
- Eupanacra hogenesi Haxaire, 80, p. 1
- Eupithecia drastica Herbulot, 81, p. 22
- Eupithecia fastuosa Herbulot, 81, p. 19
- Eupithecia pippoides Herbulot, 81, p. 19
- Eupithecia rigouti Herbulot, 81, p. 19
- Eurema elathea lamasi Brévignon, 77, p. 17
- Euselasia eubotes matouryensis Brévignon & Gallard, 77, p. 20
- Euselasia euodias talidiman Brévignon & Gallard, 73, p. 3
- Euselasia eubotes matouryensis Brévignon & Gallard, 77, p. 20
- Euselasia urites eglawahe Brévignon & Gallard, 77, p. 20
- Godyris zavaleta eutelina Brévignon, 77, p. 19
- Graphium antheus atrantheus Basquin & Turlin, 51, p. 1
- Graphium stratiodes striarubra Sala, 75-76, p. 35
- Hippotion psammochroma Basquin, 62, p. 14
- Holocerina basquini Darge, 50, p. 27
- Hypocrita simulatrix Toulgoët, 81, p. 28
- Hyposcada anchiala gallardi dujardini Brévignon, 80, p. 28
- Hyposcada illinissa dujardini Brévignon, 80, p. 27
- Lycaena pang weissi Bozano, 77, p. 25
- Pyrrhogyra amphiro agilis Brévignon, 83, p. 14
- Pyrrhogyra stratonicus matthias Brévignon, 83, p. 14
- Melander thalassicus Brévignon & Gallard, 73, p. 5
- Melanocera dargei Terral, 70, p. 14
- Melanocera widenti Terral & Darge, 70, p. 16
- Mesene mahurya Brévignon, 77, p. 20
- Mesene silaris maroni Brévignon, 77, p. 21
- Mesosemia esmeralda Gallard & Brévignon, 62, p. 12
- Micragone plitzari Basquin, 62, p. 14
- Morpho amphitryon cinereus Duchêne, 48, p. 25
- Morpho amphitryon duponti Duchêne, 62, p. 15
- Nymphidium fulmigans guyanensis Gallard & Brévignon, 63, p. 4
- Olepa anomi Orhant, 50, p. 11
- Olepa duboisi Orhant, 50, p. 11
- Olepa koslandana Orhant, 50, p. 12
- Olepa toulgoeti Orhant, 50, p. 13
- Oleria astrea chloris Lamas & Brévignon, 80, p. 29
- Oleria onega hermieri Brévignon, 80, p. 31
- Oleria sexmaculata saulensis Brévignon, 80, p. 30
- Ornithoptera (Ornithoptera) croesus wallacei Deslisle, 71, p. 5
- Orthogonioptilum adiegetum bafutensis Darge, 57, p. 22
- Orthogonioptilum adiegetum mucronatum Darge, 57, p. 23
- Orthogonioptilum adiegetum neodollmani Darge, 57, p. 23
- Orthogonioptilum adiegetum pseudadiegetum Darge, 57, p. 22
- Orthogonioptilum adiegetum restrictum Darge, 57, p. 21
- Orthogonioptilum adiegetum ugandensis Darge, 57, p. 23
- Orthogonioptilum apium Basquin, 83, p. 10
- Orthogonioptilum crystallinum Darge, 79, p. 20
- Orthogonioptilum dargei Basquin, 75-76, p. 49
- Orthogonioptilum emmanuellae Basquin, 83, p. 9
- Orthogonioptilum galleyi Basquin, 75-76, p. 50
- Orthogonioptilum loloense Basquin, 83, p. 10
- Orthogonioptilum perarcuatum Darge, 79, p. 21
- Orthogonioptilum sejunctum Darge, 79, p. 20
- Orthogonioptilum umbrulatum Basquin, 83, p. 10
- Panacea bleuzeni Plantrou & Attal, 50, p. 23
- Papilio aegeus demoi Sala, 75-76, p. 34
- Papilio aegeus marioi Sala, 75-76, p. 34
- Papilio phorca congoanus ponzonii Sala, 75-76, p. 35
- Papilio nireus cedeae Sala, 75-76, p. 35
- Papilio isidorus pseudoflavescens Sala, 75-76, p. 35
- Papilio rumanzovia moscai Sala, 75-76, p. 35
- Parnassius acco goergneri Weiss & Michel, 61, p. 13
- Parnassius acco rosea Weiss & Michel, 61, p. 13
- Parnassius acdestis cerevisiae Weiss & Michel, 61, p. 15
- Parnassius acdestis imperatoides Weiss & Michel, 61, p. 15
- Parnassius acdestis limitis Weiss & Michel, 61, p. 14
- Parnassius actius lahulensis Weiss, 68, p. 12
- Parnassius apollonius werneri Weiss, 68, p. 12
- Parnassius boedromius marcopolo Weiss, 82, p. 37
- Parnassius cephalus dengxiaoping Weiss & Michel, 61, p. 5
- Parnassius cephalus shinkaii Weiss, 69, p. 1
- Parnassius delphius pensi Eisner & Weiss, 68, p. 9
- Parnassius epaphus rienki Eisner & Weiss, 68, p. 10
- Parnassius imperator jiyetiani Pierrat, 67, p. 5
- Parnassius imperator karmapa Weiss & Michel, 61, p. 15
- Parnassius labeyriei Weiss & Michel, 61, p. 7
- Parnassius labeyriei giacomazzoi Weiss, 70, p. 9
- Parnassius priamus meveli Weiss & Michel, 61, p. 14
- Parnassius przewalskii humboldti Pierrat & Porion, 59, p. 1
- Parnassius schultei Weiss & Michel, 61, p. 5
- Parnassius simo kangruensis Eisner & Weiss, 68, p. 8
- Perisana affinis Crosson du Cormier & Attal, 83, p. 35
- Polyptychus barnsi Darge, 65, p. 8
- Polyptychus distensus Darge, 65, p. 10
- Polyptychus herbuloti Darge, 65, p. 9
- Polyptychus potiendus Darge, 65, p. 8
- Rebinea Razowski, 52, p. 22
- Ripponia hypolitus sulaensis semimasculata Deslisle, 71, p. 4
- Roeberella flocculus Brévignon & Gallard, 77, p. 22
- Seticosta Razowski, 52, p. 22
- Symmachia miron pulchellita Brévignon & Gallard, 73, p. 5
- Symmachia seducta Brévignon, 77, p. 21
- Symmachia seducta Brévignon, 77, p. 21
- Teinopalpus aureus eminens Turlin, 70, p. 6
- Teinopalpus imperialis imperialis kabruana Turlin, 70, p. 4
- Teinopalpus imperialis gillesi Turlin, 70, p. 4
- Theope galionicus Gallard & Brévignon, 63, p. 5
- Thisbe fenestrella cayennensis Brévignon & Gallard, 73, p. 5
- Troides darcius clementinae Sala, 75-76, p. 34
- Troides darcius donae Sala, 75-76, p. 34
- Troides helena dempoensis Deslisle, 80, p. 33
- Troides helena rayae Deslisle, 71, p. 2
- Troides miranda annae Deslisle, 59, p. 9
- Uelia Razowsky, 34, p. 3
- Uelia sepidapex Razowsky, 34, p. 3
- Usta grantae Terral & Lequeux, 70, p. 14
- Vila carmenae Le Crom, 65, 15
- Zelotaea alba Gallard & Brévignon, 63, p. 4
- Zelotaea suffusca Brévignon & Gallard, 77, p. 23
- Zerynthia polyxena polyxena diabolica Schulte & Weiss, 69, p. 2
- Zerynthia rumina rumina branesae Rivoire, 75-76, p. 34

=== Hymenoptera (sawflies, wasps, bees, and ants) ===
- Scolia (Scolia) hortorum nouveli Hamon, 74, p. 17

=== Arachnida (eight-legged invertebrates) ===
- Arachnocoris karukerae Lopez, 65, p. 3
- Argyrodes benedicti Lopez, 59, p. 20
- Argyrodes calmettei Lopez, 67, p. 19
- Argyrodes coactatus Lopez, 59, p. 17
- Argyrodes borbonicus Lopez, 67, p. 20
- Ogulnius hayoti Lopez, 81, p. 7

== Issue dates ==
- 1: June 1972 (no exact date)
- 2: December 1972 (no exact date)
- 3: June 1973 (no exact date)
- 4: December 1973 (no exact date)
- 5: June 1974 (no exact date)
- 6: December 1974 (no exact date)
- 7: June 1975 (no exact date)
- 8: August 1975 (no exact date)
- 9: December 1975 (no exact date)
- 10: April 1976 (no exact date)
- 11: August 1976 (no exact date)
- 12: December 1976 (no exact date)
- 13: April 1977 (no exact date)
- 14: June 1977 (no exact date)
- 15: 15 October 1977
- 16: 20 December 1977
- 17: 8 February 1978
- 18: 28 June 1978
- 19: 6 October 1978
- 20: 29 December 1978
- 21: 9 April 1979
- 22: 5 July 1979
- 23: 15 October 1979
- 24: 14 January 1980
- 25: 25 April 1980
- 26: 15 July 1980
- 27: 18 October 1980
- 28: 16 March 1981
- 29-30: 22 July 1981
- 31: 31 January 1982
- 32: 25 May 1982
- 33: 30 July 1982
- 34: 10 December 1982
- 35: 28 January 1983
- 36: 31 May 1983
- 37: 8 July 1983
- 38: 30 August 1983
- 39: 18 November 1983
- 40: 29 February 1984
- 41: 25 May 1984
- 42: 25 May 1984
- 43: 7 November 1984
- 44: 14 November 1984
- 45: 18 January 1985
- 46: 30 April 1985
- 47: 15 November 1985
- 48: 15 November 1985
- 49: 20 April 1986
- 50: 22 September 1986
- 51: 31 October 1986
- 52: 28 November 1986
- 53: 21 January 1987
- 54: 15 April 1987
- 55: 29 August 1987
- 56: 31 December 1987
- 57: 15 April 1988
- 58: 30 June 1988
- 59: 15 January 1989
- 60: 19 January 1989
- 61: 28 February 1989
- 62: 30 June 1989
- 63: 15 November 1989
- 64: 15 December 1989
- 65: 15 January 1990
- 66: 20 June 1990
- 67: 31 October 1990
- 68: 20 December 1990
- 69: 30 April 1991
- 70: 31 July 1991
- 71: 25 September 1991
- 72: 18 November 1991
- 73: 24 April 1992
- 74: 3 July 1992
- 75-76: 26 October 1992
- 77: 26 March 1993
- 78: 30 June 1993
- 79: 25 October 1993
- 80: 27 December 1993
- 81: 1 April 1994
- 82: 30 September 1994
- 83: 15 May 1995
