= Typocaeta togoensis =

Scientific classification
- Kingdom: Animalia
- Phylum: Arthropoda
- Class: Insecta
- Order: Coleoptera
- Suborder: Polyphaga
- Infraorder: Cucujiformia
- Family: Cerambycidae
- Genus: Typocaeta
- Species: T. togoensis

Binomial name
- Typocaeta togoensis Adlbauer, 1995

Species of beetle

Typocaeta togoensis is a species of beetle in the family Cerambycidae. It was described by Adlbauer in 1995.
