= Cychropsis gigantea =

Scientific classification
- Domain: Eukaryota
- Kingdom: Animalia
- Phylum: Arthropoda
- Class: Insecta
- Order: Coleoptera
- Suborder: Adephaga
- Family: Carabidae
- Subfamily: Carabinae
- Genus: Cychropsis
- Species: C. gigantea

Binomial name
- Cychropsis gigantea Deuve, 1992

Species of beetle

Cychropsis gigantea is a species in the beetle family Carabidae. It is found in China.

== Subspecies ==
These two subspecies belong to the species Cychropsis gigantea:

- Cychropsis gigantea gigantea Deuve, 1992 (China)
- Cychropsis gigantea hungi Kleinfeld, 2000 (China)
