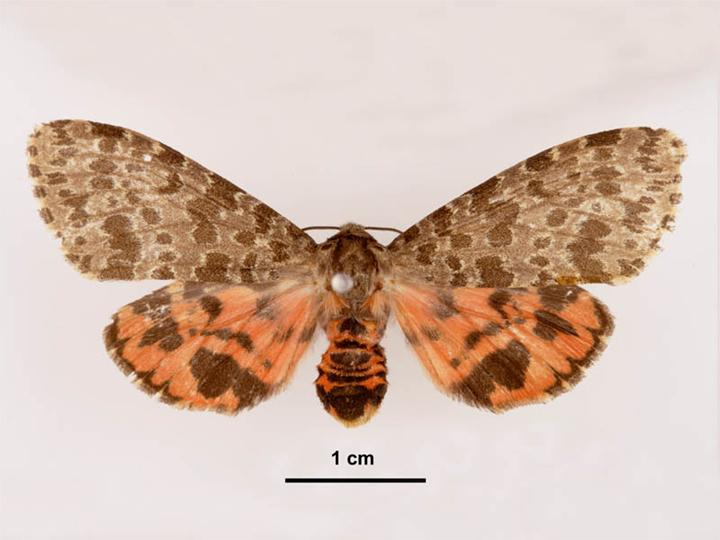
- Dorsal view of a species close to Olepa ricini
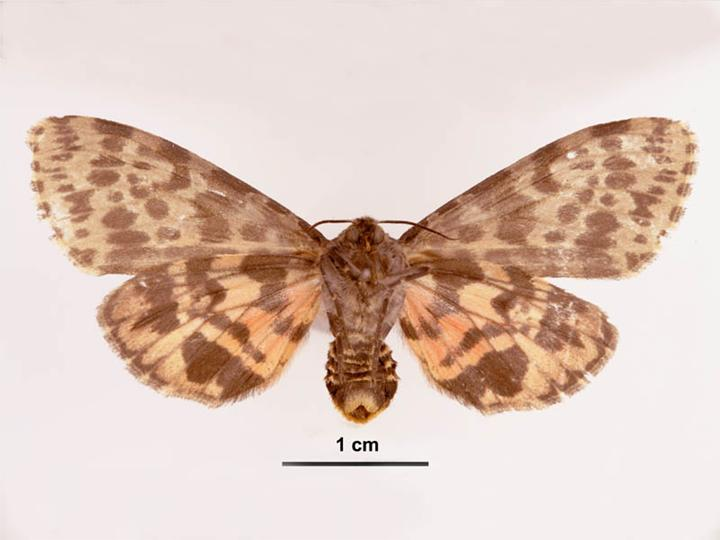
- Ventral view of a species close to Olepa ricini

Scientific classification
- Kingdom: Animalia
- Phylum: Arthropoda
- Clade: Pancrustacea
- Class: Insecta
- Order: Lepidoptera
- Superfamily: Noctuoidea
- Family: Erebidae
- Subfamily: Arctiinae
- Genus: Olepa
- Species: O. ricini

Binomial name
- Olepa ricini (Fabricius, 1775)

Synonyms
- Pericallia ricini; Bombyx ricini Fabricius, 1775; Bombyx zerah Stoll, [1782]

= Olepa ricini =

Species of moth

Olepa ricini is a moth of the family Erebidae first described by Johan Christian Fabricius in 1775. It is found in Bangladesh, India, Nepal, and Sri Lanka. An older treatment placed the species in the genus Pericallia.

== Description ==
It closely resembles the much less distributed Olepa ocellifera, and differs only in the lack of a chain like series of small yellow banded black spots in between large spots in forewings, which are present in O. ocellifera.

In The Fauna of British India, Including Ceylon and Burma: Moths Volume II, Hampson discussed both species as follows:

Head and thorax dark grey-brown; collar fringed with crimson and with a pair of pale-ringed black spots; tegulae with two pairs and vertex of thorax with one similar spot; abdomen crimson, with a series of short dorsal black bands and lateral spots. Fore wing fuscous brown, with very numerous pale-ringed black spots in the interspaces. Hind wing crimson, with antemedial, medial, postmedial, and marginal bands and more or less conjoined blotches.

The variety clavatus has the hind wing orange, whilst in zerah it is yellow.

Larva dark brown speckled with white, and with dorsal and ateral tufts of long dark hair.

It is a minor pest, as a caterpillar, on cotton, castor, sunflower, gingelly, maize, ivy gourd, brinjal, sweetpotato, banana and Cucurbita crops.
