= Cychropsis martensi =

Scientific classification
- Domain: Eukaryota
- Kingdom: Animalia
- Phylum: Arthropoda
- Class: Insecta
- Order: Coleoptera
- Suborder: Adephaga
- Family: Carabidae
- Genus: Cychropsis
- Species: C. martensi

Binomial name
- Cychropsis martensi Heinz, 1994

Species of beetle

Cychropsis martensi is a species of ground beetle in the subfamily of Carabinae. It was described by Heinz in 1994.
