= Olepa neumuthi =

Scientific classification
- Domain: Eukaryota
- Kingdom: Animalia
- Phylum: Arthropoda
- Class: Insecta
- Order: Lepidoptera
- Superfamily: Noctuoidea
- Family: Erebidae
- Subfamily: Arctiinae
- Genus: Olepa
- Species: O. neumuthi

Binomial name
- Olepa neumuthi Orhant, 2012

Species of moth

Olepa neumuthi is a species of moth the family Erebidae. It is endemic to the Indochinese region and was discovered in 2011 by the German entomologist Hans Helmuth Neumuth (1942-2013) and classified by the French entomologist Georges E.R.J. Orhant.

The larvae only feed on Ricinus communis, which is curious because this plants produces the natural insecticide ricin.
