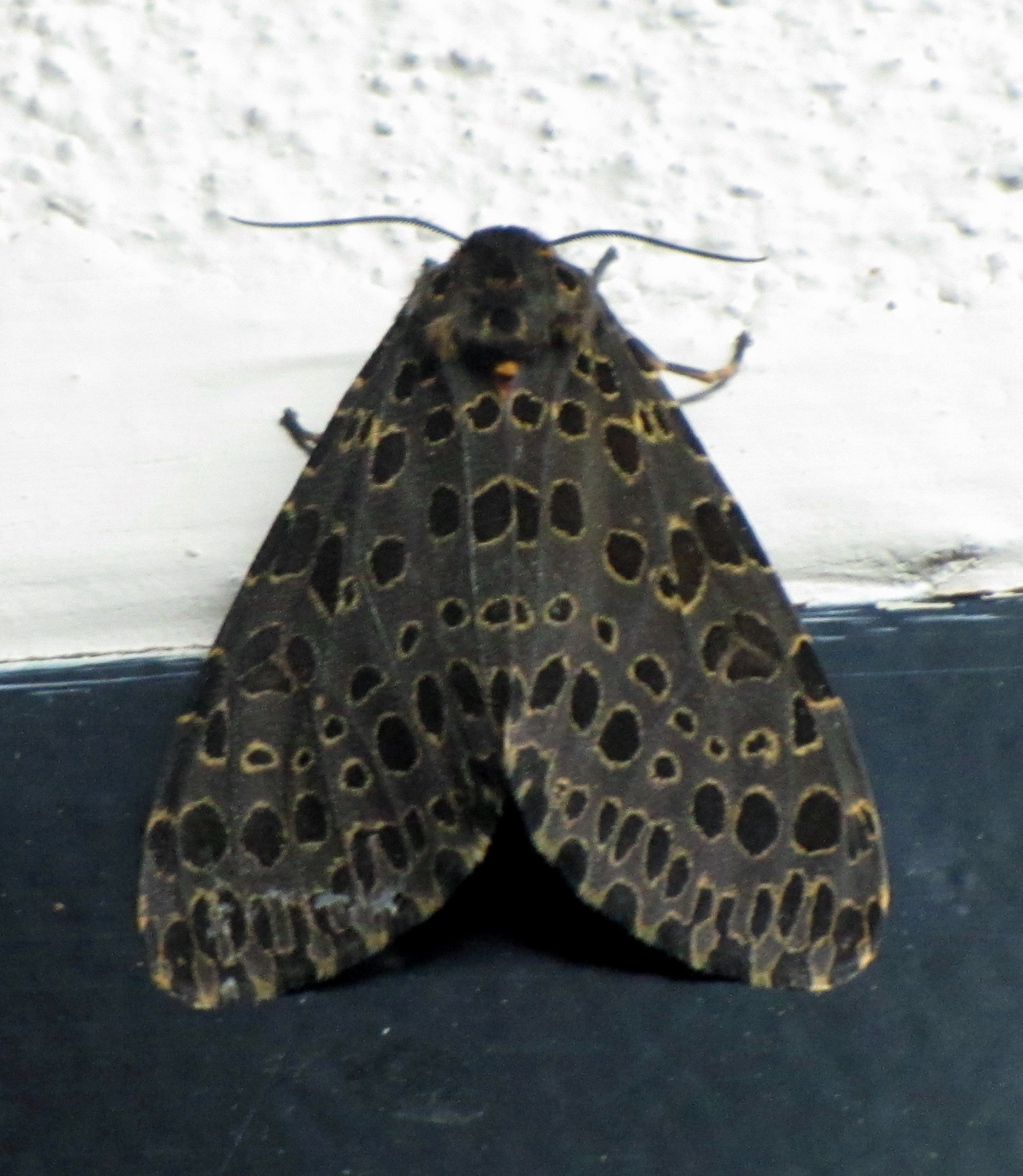

Scientific classification
- Kingdom: Animalia
- Phylum: Arthropoda
- Class: Insecta
- Order: Lepidoptera
- Superfamily: Noctuoidea
- Family: Erebidae
- Subfamily: Arctiinae
- Genus: Olepa
- Species: O. ocellifera

Binomial name
- Olepa ocellifera (Walker, 1855)

Synonyms
- Alope ocellifera Walker, 1855

= Olepa ocellifera =

Species of moth

Olepa ocellifera is a moth of the family Erebidae first described by Francis Walker in 1855. It is found in India and Sri Lanka.

== Description ==
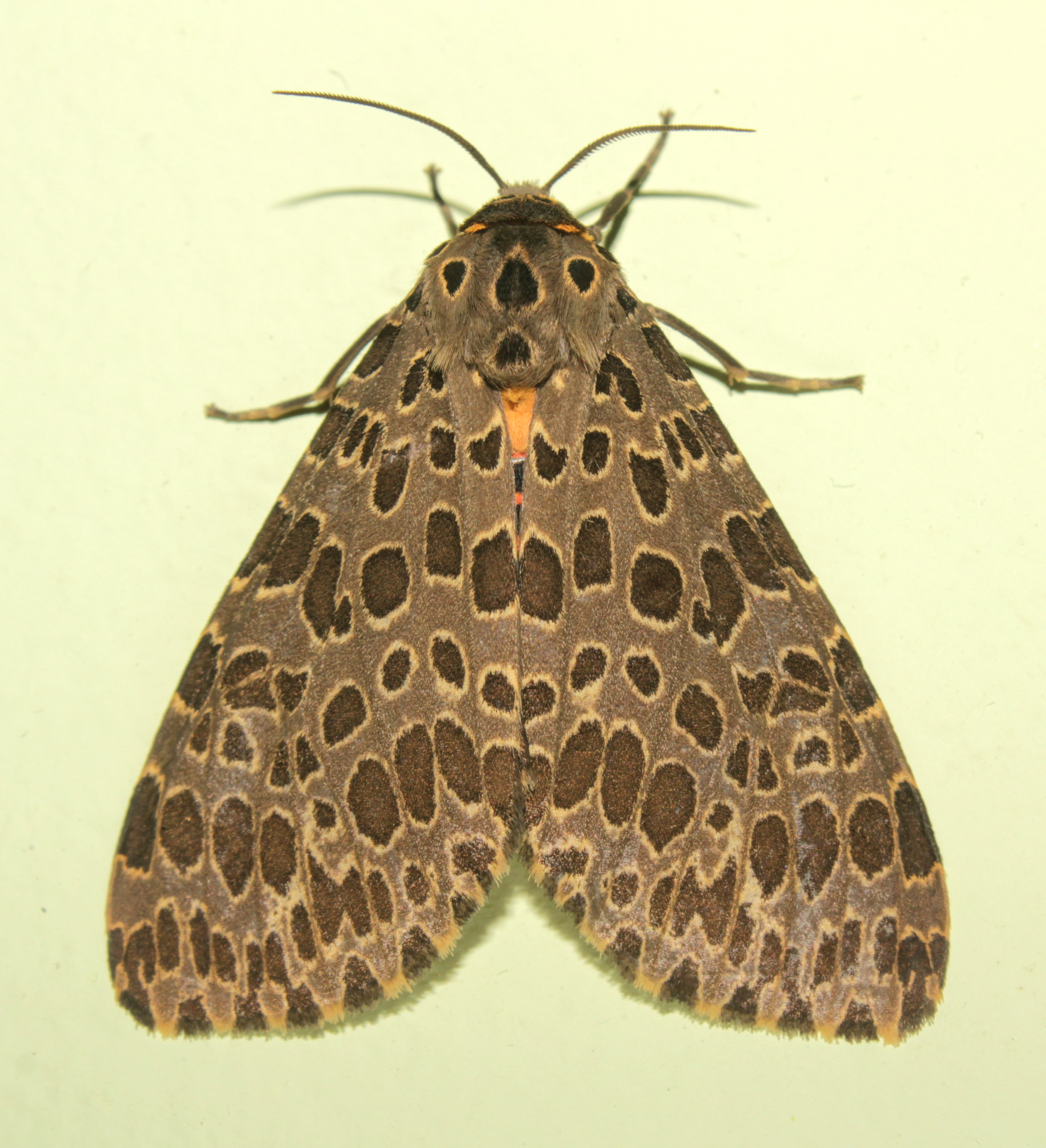
At Kanjirappally, India

This species closely resembles the much more widely distributed Olepa ricini, and differs only in the presence of a chain-like series of small yellow-banded black spots in between the large spots on the forewings, which are lacking in O. ricini. Head and thorax dark greyish brown. Collar fringed with crimson and with a pair of pale-ringed black spots. Tegulae with two pairs and vertex of thorax with one similar spot. Abdomen crimson with a series of short dorsal black bands and lateral spots. Forewings are fuscous brown with very numerous pale-ringed black spots in the interspaces. Hindwing crimson, with ante-medial, medial, post-medial and marginal bands and more or less conjoined blotches. Larva dark brown in body colour with white and dorsal and lateral tufts of long dark hair.
