= Cychropsis wittmeri =

Scientific classification
- Kingdom: Animalia
- Phylum: Arthropoda
- Clade: Pancrustacea
- Class: Insecta
- Order: Coleoptera
- Suborder: Adephaga
- Family: Carabidae
- Genus: Cychropsis
- Species: C. wittmeri

Binomial name
- Cychropsis wittmeri Mandl, 1975

Species of beetle

Cychropsis wittmeri is a species of ground beetle in the subfamily of Carabinae. It was described by Mandl in 1975.
