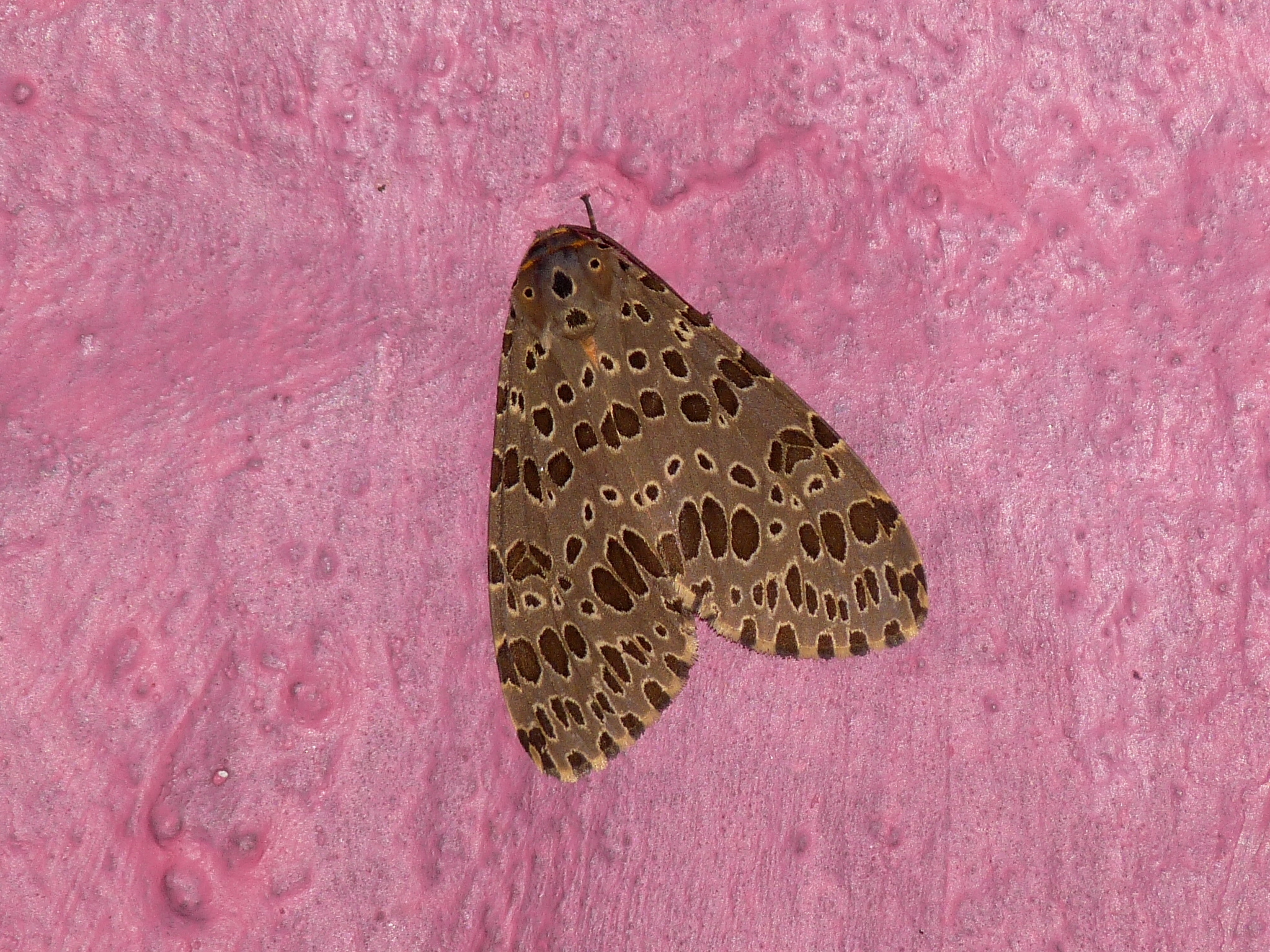
- Olepa sp. at Kerala, India

Scientific classification
- Domain: Eukaryota
- Kingdom: Animalia
- Phylum: Arthropoda
- Class: Insecta
- Order: Lepidoptera
- Superfamily: Noctuoidea
- Family: Erebidae
- Subfamily: Arctiinae
- Subtribe: Spilosomina
- Genus: Olepa; Watson, 1980

Type species
- Alope ocellifera Walker, 1855

Synonyms
- Alope Walker, 1855

= Olepa =

Genus of moths

Olepa is a genus of moths in the family Erebidae. The genus was described by Watson in 1980. Most part of species occur in India and Sri Lanka, though one species was described from Israel. Its name is the anagram of Alope, the original preoccupied name of the genus.

== Species ==
- ricini group:
  - Olepa clavatus (Swinhoe, 1885)
  - Olepa coromandelica Dubatolov, 2011
  - Olepa koslandana Orhant, 1986
  - Olepa neumuthi Orhant, 2012
  - Olepa ricini (Fabricius, 1775)
  - Olepa schleini Witt et al., 2005
  - Olepa toulgoeti Orhant, 1986
- ocellifera group
  - Olepa anomi Orhant, 1986
  - Olepa duboisi Orhant, 1986
  - Olepa kakatii Orhant, 2000
  - Olepa ocellifera (Walker, 1855)
