= Cychropsis draconis =

Scientific classification
- Kingdom: Animalia
- Phylum: Arthropoda
- Clade: Pancrustacea
- Class: Insecta
- Order: Coleoptera
- Suborder: Adephaga
- Family: Carabidae
- Genus: Cychropsis
- Species: C. draconis

Binomial name
- Cychropsis draconis Deuve, 1990

Species of beetle

Cychropsis draconis is a species of ground beetle in the subfamily of Carabinae. It was described by Deuve in 1990.
