= Typocaeta subfasciata =

Scientific classification
- Kingdom: Animalia
- Phylum: Arthropoda
- Class: Insecta
- Order: Coleoptera
- Suborder: Polyphaga
- Infraorder: Cucujiformia
- Family: Cerambycidae
- Genus: Typocaeta
- Species: T. subfasciata

Binomial name
- Typocaeta subfasciata Thomson, 1864

Species of beetle

Typocaeta subfasciata is a species of beetle in the family Cerambycidae. It was described by Thomson in 1864.
