= Cychropsis fuscotarsalis =

Scientific classification
- Domain: Eukaryota
- Kingdom: Animalia
- Phylum: Arthropoda
- Class: Insecta
- Order: Coleoptera
- Suborder: Adephaga
- Family: Carabidae
- Genus: Cychropsis
- Species: C. fuscotarsalis

Binomial name
- Cychropsis fuscotarsalis Deuve, 2003

Species of beetle

Cychropsis fuscotarsalis is a species of ground beetle in the subfamily of Carabinae. It was described by Deuve in 2003.
