= Cychropsis lucifer =

Scientific classification
- Domain: Eukaryota
- Kingdom: Animalia
- Phylum: Arthropoda
- Class: Insecta
- Order: Coleoptera
- Suborder: Adephaga
- Family: Carabidae
- Genus: Cychropsis
- Species: C. lucifer

Binomial name
- Cychropsis lucifer Cavazzuti, 1996

Species of beetle

Cychropsis lucifer is a species of ground beetle in the subfamily of Carabinae. It was described by Cavazzuti in 1996.
