= Cychropsis deuvei =

Scientific classification
- Domain: Eukaryota
- Kingdom: Animalia
- Phylum: Arthropoda
- Class: Insecta
- Order: Coleoptera
- Suborder: Adephaga
- Family: Carabidae
- Genus: Cychropsis
- Species: C. deuvei

Binomial name
- Cychropsis deuvei Korell & Klienfeld, 1987

Species of beetle

Cychropsis deuvei is a species of ground beetle in the subfamily of Carabinae. It was described by Korell & Klienfeld in 1987.
