= Cychropsis hartmanni =

Scientific classification
- Domain: Eukaryota
- Kingdom: Animalia
- Phylum: Arthropoda
- Class: Insecta
- Order: Coleoptera
- Suborder: Adephaga
- Family: Carabidae
- Genus: Cychropsis
- Species: C. hartmanni

Binomial name
- Cychropsis hartmanni Deuve & J. Schmidt, 2005

Species of beetle

Cychropsis hartmanni is a species of ground beetle in the subfamily of Carabinae. It was described by Deuve & J. Schmidt in 2005.
