= Cychropsis casalei =

Scientific classification
- Domain: Eukaryota
- Kingdom: Animalia
- Phylum: Arthropoda
- Class: Insecta
- Order: Coleoptera
- Suborder: Adephaga
- Family: Carabidae
- Genus: Cychropsis
- Species: C. casalei

Binomial name
- Cychropsis casalei (Cavazzuti, 1996)

Species of beetle

Cychropsis casalei is a species of ground beetle in the subfamily of Carabinae. It was described by Cavazzuti in 1996.
