= Cychropsis paramontana =

Scientific classification
- Kingdom: Animalia
- Phylum: Arthropoda
- Class: Insecta
- Order: Coleoptera
- Suborder: Adephaga
- Family: Carabidae
- Genus: Cychropsis
- Species: C. paramontana

Binomial name
- Cychropsis paramontana Sehnal & Hackel, 2006

Species of beetle

Cychropsis paramontana is a species of black coloured ground beetle in the subfamily of Carabinae. It was described by Sehnal & Hackel in 2006 and is endemic to China.
