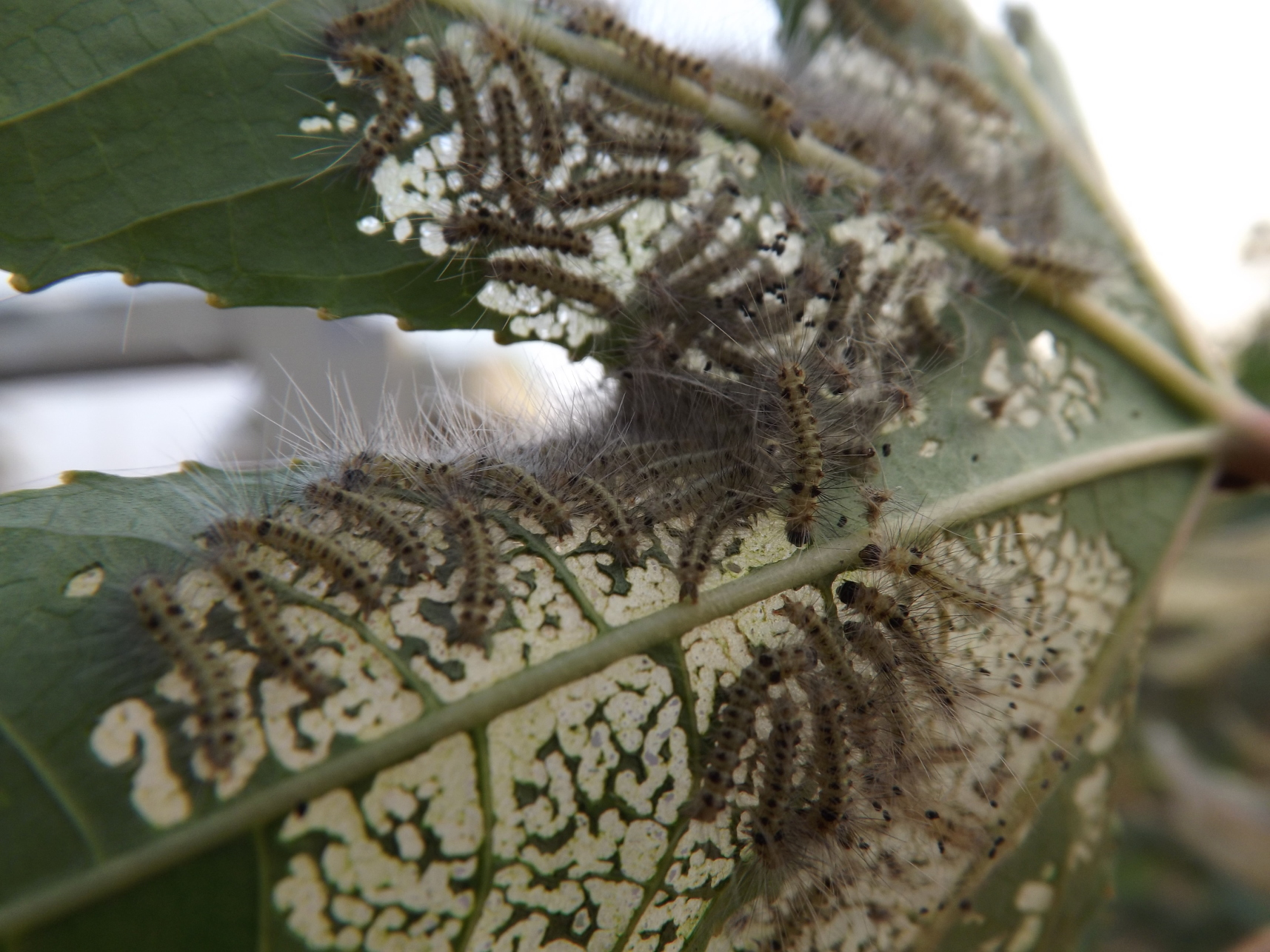

Scientific classification
- Kingdom: Animalia
- Phylum: Arthropoda
- Clade: Pancrustacea
- Class: Insecta
- Order: Lepidoptera
- Superfamily: Noctuoidea
- Family: Erebidae
- Subfamily: Arctiinae
- Genus: Olepa
- Species: O. schleini

Binomial name
- Olepa schleini Witt et al., 2005

= Olepa schleini =

Species of moth

Olepa schleini is a moth of the family Erebidae first described by Thomas J. Witt, Günter C. Müller, Vasiliy D. Kravchenko, Michael A. Miller, Axel Hausmann and Wolfgang Speidel in 2005.
