= Cychropsis sikkimensis =

Scientific classification
- Kingdom: Animalia
- Phylum: Arthropoda
- Class: Insecta
- Order: Coleoptera
- Suborder: Adephaga
- Family: Carabidae
- Genus: Cychropsis
- Species: C. sikkimensis

Binomial name
- Cychropsis sikkimensis Fairmaire, 1901

Species of beetle

Cychropsis sikkimensis is a species of ground beetle in the subfamily of Carabinae. It was described by Fairmaire in 1901.
