= Falsapomecyna albolineata =

Scientific classification
- Kingdom: Animalia
- Phylum: Arthropoda
- Class: Insecta
- Order: Coleoptera
- Suborder: Polyphaga
- Infraorder: Cucujiformia
- Family: Cerambycidae
- Genus: Falsapomecyna
- Species: F. albolineata

Binomial name
- Falsapomecyna albolineata Breuning, 1942

Synonyms
- Pterolophioides clarkei Breuning, 1976

Species of beetle

Falsapomecyna albolineata is a species of beetle in the family Cerambycidae. It was described by Stephan von Breuning in 1942.
