= Cychropsis coronata =

Scientific classification
- Domain: Eukaryota
- Kingdom: Animalia
- Phylum: Arthropoda
- Class: Insecta
- Order: Coleoptera
- Suborder: Adephaga
- Family: Carabidae
- Subfamily: Carabinae
- Genus: Cychropsis
- Species: C. coronata

Binomial name
- Cychropsis coronata (Cavazzuti, 1996)

Species of beetle

Cychropsis coronata is a species in the beetle family Carabidae. It is found in China.
