= Typocaeta parva =

Scientific classification
- Kingdom: Animalia
- Phylum: Arthropoda
- Class: Insecta
- Order: Coleoptera
- Suborder: Polyphaga
- Infraorder: Cucujiformia
- Family: Cerambycidae
- Genus: Typocaeta
- Species: T. parva

Binomial name
- Typocaeta parva (Breuning, 1940)

Species of beetle

Typocaeta parva is a species of beetle in the family Cerambycidae. It was described by Breuning in 1940.
