= Cychropsis mandli =

Scientific classification
- Domain: Eukaryota
- Kingdom: Animalia
- Phylum: Arthropoda
- Class: Insecta
- Order: Coleoptera
- Suborder: Adephaga
- Family: Carabidae
- Subfamily: Carabinae
- Genus: Cychropsis
- Species: C. mandli

Binomial name
- Cychropsis mandli Paulus, 1971

Synonyms
- Cychrus schmidti

Species of beetle

Cychropsis mandli is a species in the beetle family Carabidae. It is found in Nepal.

== Subspecies ==
These five subspecies belong to the species Cychropsis mandli:

- Cychropsis mandli eremicola Deuve & J.Schmidt, 2005
- Cychropsis mandli jeanimarcilhaci Deuve, 2003
- Cychropsis mandli mandli Paulus, 1971
- Cychropsis mandli schmidti Heinz, 1994
- Cychropsis mandli tenuoritarsalis Deuve & J.Schmidt, 2005
