= Cychropsis beatepuchnerae =

Scientific classification
- Domain: Eukaryota
- Kingdom: Animalia
- Phylum: Arthropoda
- Class: Insecta
- Order: Coleoptera
- Suborder: Adephaga
- Family: Carabidae
- Genus: Cychropsis
- Species: C. beatepuchnerae

Binomial name
- Cychropsis beatepuchnerae Klienfled & Puchner, 2007

Species of beetle

Cychropsis beatepuchnerae is a species of ground beetle in the subfamily of Carabinae. It was described by Klienfled & Puchner in 2007.
