= Cychropsis kabaki =

Scientific classification
- Domain: Eukaryota
- Kingdom: Animalia
- Phylum: Arthropoda
- Class: Insecta
- Order: Coleoptera
- Suborder: Adephaga
- Family: Carabidae
- Genus: Cychropsis
- Species: C. kabaki

Binomial name
- Cychropsis kabaki Imura & Haeckel, 2003

Species of beetle

Cychropsis kabaki is a species of ground beetle in the subfamily of Carabinae. It was described by Imura & Haeckel in 2003.
