= Cychropsis meihuanae =

Scientific classification
- Domain: Eukaryota
- Kingdom: Animalia
- Phylum: Arthropoda
- Class: Insecta
- Order: Coleoptera
- Suborder: Adephaga
- Family: Carabidae
- Genus: Cychropsis
- Species: C. meihuanae

Binomial name
- Cychropsis meihuanae (Imura, 1998)

Species of beetle

Cychropsis meihuanae is a species of ground beetle in the subfamily of Carabinae. It was described by Imura in 1998.
