= Cychropsis okamotoi =

Scientific classification
- Domain: Eukaryota
- Kingdom: Animalia
- Phylum: Arthropoda
- Class: Insecta
- Order: Coleoptera
- Suborder: Adephaga
- Family: Carabidae
- Subfamily: Carabinae
- Genus: Cychropsis
- Species: C. okamotoi

Binomial name
- Cychropsis okamotoi (Imura; Su & Osawa, 1998)

Synonyms
- Cychrus okamotoi

Species of beetle

Cychropsis okamotoi is a species in the beetle family Carabidae. It is found in China.

== Subspecies ==
These two subspecies belong to the species Cychropsis okamotoi:

- Cychropsis okamotoi okamotoi (Imura; Su & Osawa, 1998)
- Cychropsis okamotoi shamaevi (Deuve, 1999)
