= Cychropsis =

Scientific classification
- Domain: Eukaryota
- Kingdom: Animalia
- Phylum: Arthropoda
- Class: Insecta
- Order: Coleoptera
- Suborder: Adephaga
- Family: Carabidae
- Subfamily: Carabinae
- Genus: Cychropsis; Boileau, 1901

Subgenera
- Cychropsis Boileau, 1901; Shuocychropsis Imura, 2002

Genus of beetles

Cychropsis is a genus of ground beetles in the family Carabidae. There are more than 50 described species in Cychropsis, found in China and the Indian subcontinent.

== Species ==
These 55 species belong to the genus Cychropsis:

- Cychropsis beatepuchnerae Kleinfeld & Puchner, 2007 (China)
- Cychropsis belzebuth Deuve & Mourzine, 2009 (China)
- Cychropsis bousqueti Deuve, 1991 (China)
- Cychropsis brezinai (Deuve, 1993) (China)
- Cychropsis businskyi Deuve, 1992 (China)
- Cychropsis casalei (Cavazzuti, 1996) (China)
- Cychropsis chuandongziensis Deuve, 2017 (China)
- Cychropsis conaensis Deuve & Tian, 2009 (China)
- Cychropsis coronata (Cavazzuti, 1996) (China)
- Cychropsis cyanicollis Imura & Häckel, 2003 (China)
- Cychropsis dembickyi Imura, 2005 (the Indian subcontinent)
- Cychropsis deuvei Korell & Kleinfeld, 1987 (the Indian subcontinent)
- Cychropsis discoidicollis (Deuve, 2017) (China)
- Cychropsis draconis Deuve, 1990 (China)
- Cychropsis dreuxi (Deuve, 2013) (the Indian subcontinent)
- Cychropsis fuscotarsalis Deuve, 2003 (the Indian subcontinent)
- Cychropsis gigantea Deuve, 1992 (China)
- Cychropsis gongga Deuve & Vigna Taglianti, 1992 (China)
- Cychropsis gonggoides (Häckel & Sehnal, 2014) (China)
- Cychropsis hartmanni Deuve & J.Schmidt, 2005 (the Indian subcontinent)
- Cychropsis helicophila (Deuve & Mourzine, 2009) (China)
- Cychropsis huangcao (Häckel & Sehnal, 2014) (China)
- Cychropsis infernalis Cavazzuti, 1996 (China)
- Cychropsis janataiana Deuve, 2007 (China)
- Cychropsis janetscheki Mandl, 1970 (the Indian subcontinent)
- Cychropsis jiabiensis Imura & Cavazzuti, 2019 (China)
- Cychropsis kabaki Imura & Häckel, 2003 (China)
- Cychropsis korelli Kleinfeld, 1999 (China)
- Cychropsis liangi (Deuve & Tian, 2013) (China)
- Cychropsis lucifer Cavazzuti, 1996 (China)
- Cychropsis malacophila (Deuve & Mourzine, 2010) (China)
- Cychropsis mandli Paulus, 1971 (the Indian subcontinent)
- Cychropsis maoniushana Imura & Cavazzuti, 2017 (China)
- Cychropsis martensi Heinz, 1994 (the Indian subcontinent)
- Cychropsis meihuanae (Imura, 1998) (China)
- Cychropsis nagahatai Imura, 2004 (China)
- Cychropsis namchabarwana Imura, 1999 (China)
- Cychropsis nepalensis Mandl, 1965 (the Indian subcontinent)
- Cychropsis okamotoi (Imura & Su&Osawa, 1998) (China)
- Cychropsis paramontana Sehnal & Häckel, 2006 (China)
- Cychropsis paramontanoides Imura & Cavazzuti, 2017 (China)
- Cychropsis poggii Cavazzuti, 2010 (China)
- Cychropsis shiva Deuve & J.Schmidt, 2010 (the Indian subcontinent)
- Cychropsis sikkimensis (Fairmaire, 1901) (the Indian subcontinent)
- Cychropsis surkiensis Deuve, 2003 (the Indian subcontinent)
- Cychropsis tiani Deuve, 2011 (China)
- Cychropsis tigridentata Imura & Cavazzuti, 2017 (China)
- Cychropsis tryznai Häckel & Sehnal, 2007 (China)
- Cychropsis tuberculipennis Mandl, 1987 (the Indian subcontinent)
- Cychropsis weigeli Deuve & J.Schmidt, 2007 (the Indian subcontinent)
- Cychropsis weiperti Deuve & J.Schmidt, 2010 (the Indian subcontinent)
- Cychropsis weningeri Kleinfeld & Puchner, 2017 (China)
- Cychropsis wittmeri Mandl, 1975 (the Indian subcontinent)
- Cychropsis wittmeriana Deuve, 1983 (the Indian subcontinent)
- Cychropsis yuiana (Deuve & Tian, 2013) (China)
