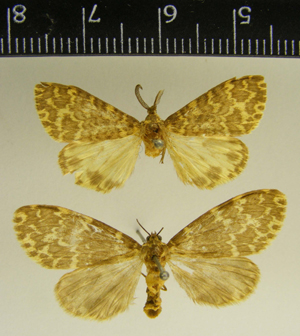
- Olepa coromandelica, types, male above, female below.

Scientific classification
- Kingdom: Animalia
- Phylum: Arthropoda
- Clade: Pancrustacea
- Class: Insecta
- Order: Lepidoptera
- Superfamily: Noctuoidea
- Family: Erebidae
- Subfamily: Arctiinae
- Genus: Olepa
- Species: O. coromandelica

Binomial name
- Olepa coromandelica Dubatolov, 2011

= Olepa coromandelica =

Species of moth

Olepa coromandelica is a moth of the family Erebidae. It was discovered in India in the 20th century, on the Coromandel Coast. No modern specimens have been found. It is presumed extinct.
