= Olepa clavatus =

Scientific classification
- Domain: Eukaryota
- Kingdom: Animalia
- Phylum: Arthropoda
- Class: Insecta
- Order: Lepidoptera
- Superfamily: Noctuoidea
- Family: Erebidae
- Subfamily: Arctiinae
- Genus: Olepa
- Species: O. clavatus

Binomial name
- Olepa clavatus (C. Swinhoe, 1885)

Synonyms
- Alope clavatus C. Swinhoe, 1885

Species of moth

Olepa clavatus is a moth of the family Erebidae first described by Charles Swinhoe in 1885. It is found in India.
