= Cychropsis weigeli =

Scientific classification
- Domain: Eukaryota
- Kingdom: Animalia
- Phylum: Arthropoda
- Class: Insecta
- Order: Coleoptera
- Suborder: Adephaga
- Family: Carabidae
- Genus: Cychropsis
- Species: C. weigeli

Binomial name
- Cychropsis weigeli Deuve & Schmidt, 2007

Species of beetle

Cychropsis weigeli is a species of ground beetle in the subfamily of Carabinae. It was described by Deuve & Schmidt in 2007.
