= Olepa kakatii =

Scientific classification
- Domain: Eukaryota
- Kingdom: Animalia
- Phylum: Arthropoda
- Class: Insecta
- Order: Lepidoptera
- Superfamily: Noctuoidea
- Family: Erebidae
- Subfamily: Arctiinae
- Genus: Olepa
- Species: O. kakatii

Binomial name
- Olepa kakatii Orhant, 2000

Species of moth

Olepa kakatii is a moth of the family Erebidae first described by Orhant in 2000. It is found in north-eastern India and Assam.
