= Cychropsis gongga =

Scientific classification
- Domain: Eukaryota
- Kingdom: Animalia
- Phylum: Arthropoda
- Class: Insecta
- Order: Coleoptera
- Suborder: Adephaga
- Family: Carabidae
- Genus: Cychropsis
- Species: C. gongga

Binomial name
- Cychropsis gongga Deuve & Vigna Taglianti, 1992

Species of beetle

Cychropsis gongga is a species of ground beetle in the subfamily of Carabinae. It was described by Deuve & Vigna Taglianti in 1992.
