= Typocaeta =

Scientific classification
- Kingdom: Animalia
- Phylum: Arthropoda
- Class: Insecta
- Order: Coleoptera
- Suborder: Polyphaga
- Infraorder: Cucujiformia
- Family: Cerambycidae
- Subfamily: Lamiinae
- Tribe: Agapanthiini
- Genus: Typocaeta; Thomson, 1864

Genus of beetles

Typocaeta is a genus of beetles in the family Cerambycidae, containing the following species:

- Typocaeta kenyana Teocchi, 1991
- Typocaeta parva (Breuning, 1940)
- Typocaeta subfasciata Thomson, 1864
- Typocaeta togoensis Adlbauer, 1995
