= Charaxes matakall =

Scientific classification
- Domain: Eukaryota
- Kingdom: Animalia
- Phylum: Arthropoda
- Class: Insecta
- Order: Lepidoptera
- Family: Nymphalidae
- Genus: Charaxes
- Species: C. matakall

Binomial name
- Charaxes matakall Darge, 1985.

Synonyms
- Charaxes matakall f. fabiennae Darge, 1985; Charaxes matakall f. franceoisixavieri Darge, 1985; Charaxes matakall f. collinsianus Darge, 1985; Charaxes matakall f. smaragdaliformis Darge, 1985

Species of butterfly

Charaxes matakall is a butterfly in the family Nymphalidae. It is found in the Republic of the Congo and the Democratic Republic of the Congo.
