= Typocaeta kenyana =

Scientific classification
- Kingdom: Animalia
- Phylum: Arthropoda
- Class: Insecta
- Order: Coleoptera
- Suborder: Polyphaga
- Infraorder: Cucujiformia
- Family: Cerambycidae
- Genus: Typocaeta
- Species: T. kenyana

Binomial name
- Typocaeta kenyana Teocchi, 1991

Species of beetle

Typocaeta kenyana is a species of beetle in the family Cerambycidae. It was described by Teocchi in 1991.
