= Uelia sepidapex =

Scientific classification
- Kingdom: Animalia
- Phylum: Arthropoda
- Class: Insecta
- Order: Lepidoptera
- Family: Tortricidae
- Genus: Uelia
- Species: U. sepidapex

Binomial name
- Uelia sepidapex Razowski, 1982

Species of moth

Uelia sepidapex is a species of moth of the family Tortricidae. It is found in Santa Catarina, Brazil.
