= Eupithecia anamnesa =

Scientific classification
- Domain: Eukaryota
- Kingdom: Animalia
- Phylum: Arthropoda
- Class: Insecta
- Order: Lepidoptera
- Family: Geometridae
- Genus: Eupithecia
- Species: E. anamnesa

Binomial name
- Eupithecia anamnesa Herbulot, 1994

Species of moth

Eupithecia anamnesa is a moth in the family Geometridae.
