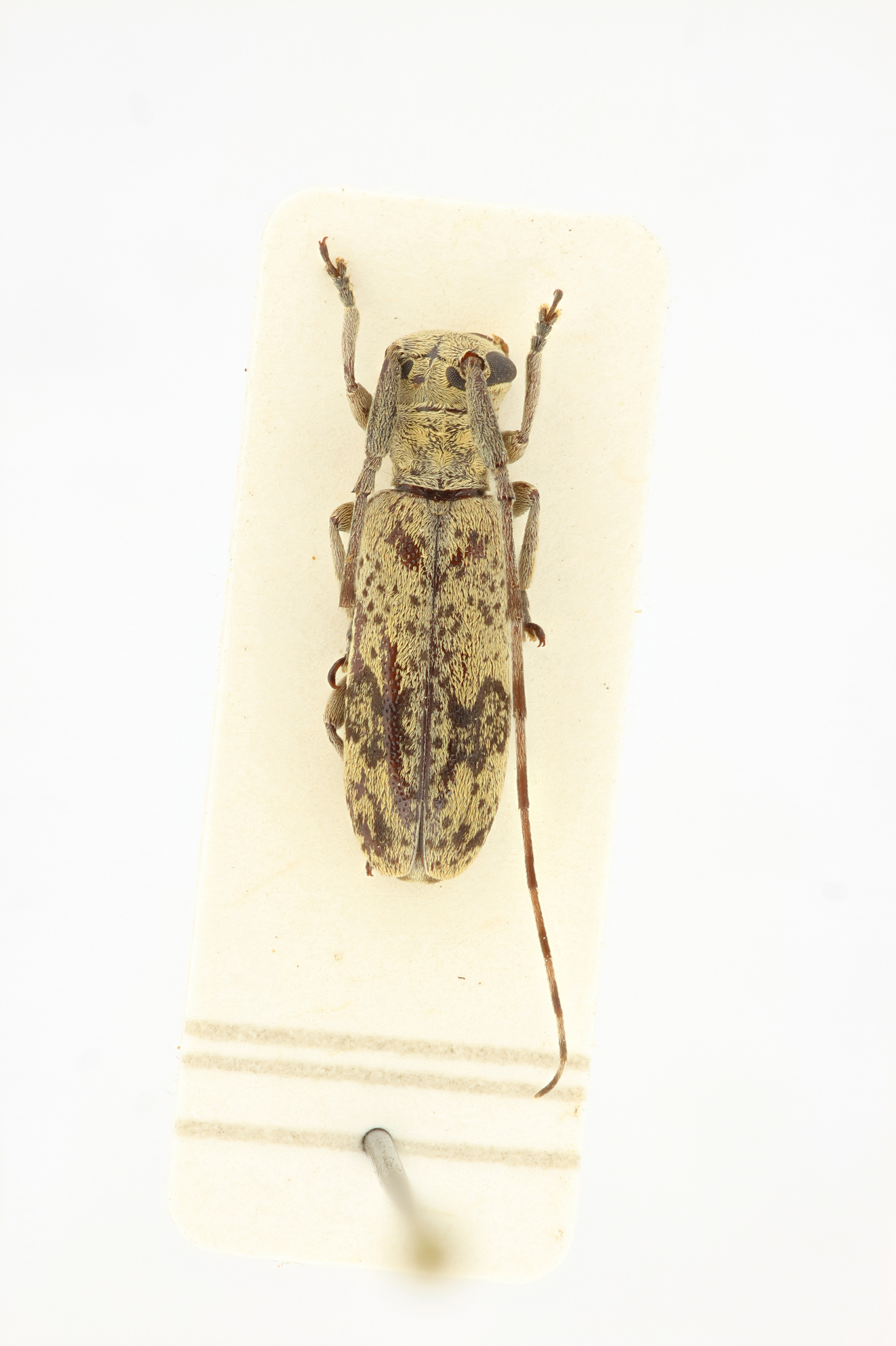

Scientific classification
- Kingdom: Animalia
- Phylum: Arthropoda
- Clade: Pancrustacea
- Class: Insecta
- Order: Coleoptera
- Suborder: Polyphaga
- Infraorder: Cucujiformia
- Family: Cerambycidae
- Genus: Eunidia
- Species: E. fuscostictica

Binomial name
- Eunidia fuscostictica Breuning, 1939

= Eunidia fuscostictica =

Species of beetle

Eunidia fuscostictica is a species of beetle in the family Cerambycidae. It was described by Stephan von Breuning in 1939.

== Subspecies ==
- Eunidia fuscostictica evansi Téocchi, 1989
- Eunidia fuscostictica fuscostictica Breuning, 1939
