= Spinocentruropsis =

Scientific classification
- Kingdom: Animalia
- Phylum: Arthropoda
- Class: Insecta
- Order: Coleoptera
- Suborder: Polyphaga
- Infraorder: Cucujiformia
- Family: Cerambycidae
- Genus: Spinocentruropsis
- Species: S. papuanus

Binomial name
- Spinocentruropsis papuanus Minet, 1987

Genus of beetles

Spinocentruropsis papuanus is a species of beetle in the family Cerambycidae, and the only species in the genus Spinocentruropsis. It was described by Gérard J. Minet in 1987.
