= Uelia =

Scientific classification
- Kingdom: Animalia
- Phylum: Arthropoda
- Class: Insecta
- Order: Lepidoptera
- Family: Tortricidae
- Tribe: Euliini
- Genus: Uelia; Razowski, 1982

Genus of tortrix moths

Uelia is a genus of moths belonging to the subfamily Tortricinae of the family Tortricidae.

== Species ==
- Uelia sepidapex Razowski, 1982

== See also ==
- List of Tortricidae genera
