= Falsapomecyna mourgliae =

Scientific classification
- Kingdom: Animalia
- Phylum: Arthropoda
- Class: Insecta
- Order: Coleoptera
- Suborder: Polyphaga
- Infraorder: Cucujiformia
- Family: Cerambycidae
- Genus: Falsapomecyna
- Species: F. mourgliae

Binomial name
- Falsapomecyna mourgliae Téocchi, 1988

Species of beetle

Falsapomecyna mourgliae is a species of beetle in the family Cerambycidae. It was described by Téocchi in 1988.
