= Neofreocorus =

Scientific classification
- Kingdom: Animalia
- Phylum: Arthropoda
- Class: Insecta
- Order: Coleoptera
- Suborder: Polyphaga
- Infraorder: Cucujiformia
- Family: Cerambycidae
- Tribe: Crossotini
- Genus: Neofreocorus
- Species: N. novaki

Binomial name
- Neofreocorus novaki Téocchi, 1988

Genus of beetles

Neofreocorus novaki is a species of beetle in the family Cerambycidae, and the only species in the genus Neofreocorus. It was described by Téocchi in 1988.
