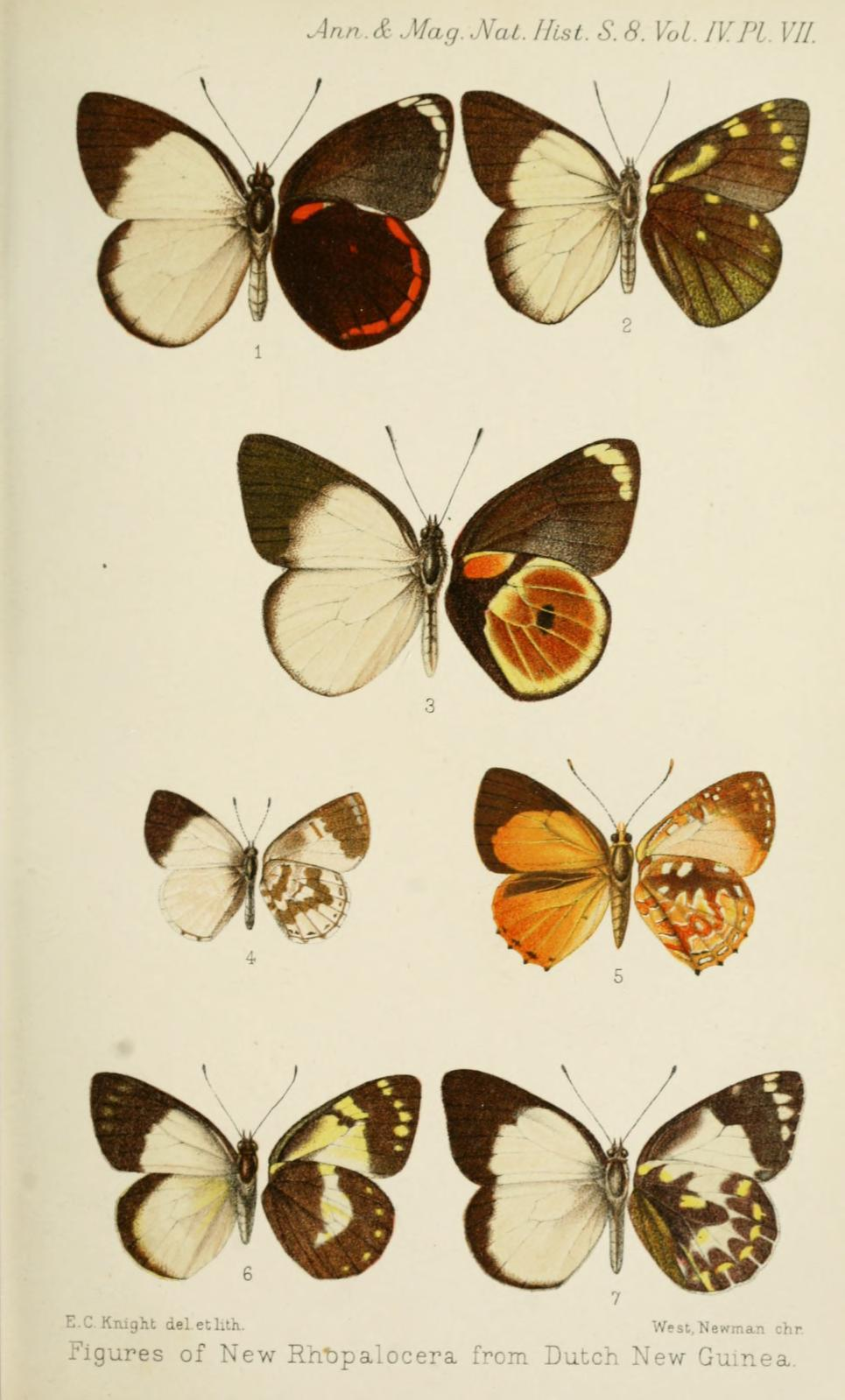
- Delias jordani in Kenrick, 1909 Descriptions of Delias from New Guinea (fig. 7)

Scientific classification
- Kingdom: Animalia
- Phylum: Arthropoda
- Class: Insecta
- Order: Lepidoptera
- Family: Pieridae
- Genus: Delias
- Species: D. jordani

Binomial name
- Delias jordani Kenrick, 1910

= Delias jordani =

Species of butterfly

Delias jordani is a butterfly in the family Pieridae. It was described by George Hamilton Kenrick in 1909. It is found in New Guinea (Arfak Mountains). The name honours Karl Jordan.

== Description ==
Upperside : fore wings white, with black costal border and large apical black patch, the division between fairly but not sharply defined.Hind wings very similar, the marginal black border not well defined. Fringes of fore wings black, of hind wings black and white.

Underside: fore wings black, a large white patch extends from inner margin to near the end of the cell, the remainder of which is filled with dark grey; below the cell the patch extends beyond the cell, but not quite so far as the angle; a band of five transverse spots occurs before the apex, the one on the costa is yellow, the others are white. Hind wings black, the fold powdered with orange scales.Basal patch very small, Indian yellow; a narrow white costal band expands into an irregular transverse band, reaching nervure 2, but constricted and nearly divided in the middle; along the nervures this white band extends in a series of sharp points.Beyond this is a band of six irregular yellow spots, the four lower ones being connected to the costa by narrow white lines. There is an interrupted white marginal line, and the fringes of the hind wings are mostly white. Across the disk are three ill-defined yellow spots. Expanse 57 mm. Hab. Momi, 4000 feet, November and December.
