= Pterotragula =

Scientific classification
- Kingdom: Animalia
- Phylum: Arthropoda
- Class: Insecta
- Order: Coleoptera
- Suborder: Polyphaga
- Infraorder: Cucujiformia
- Family: Cerambycidae
- Genus: Pterotragula
- Species: P. leucoloma

Binomial name
- Pterotragula leucoloma (Laporte de Castelnau, 1840)

Genus of beetles

Pterotragula leucoloma is a species of beetle in the family Cerambycidae, and the only species in the genus Pterotragula. It was described by Laporte de Castelnau in 1840.
