= Eupithecia rigouti =

Scientific classification
- Domain: Eukaryota
- Kingdom: Animalia
- Phylum: Arthropoda
- Class: Insecta
- Order: Lepidoptera
- Family: Geometridae
- Genus: Eupithecia
- Species: E. rigouti

Binomial name
- Eupithecia rigouti Herbulot, 1994

Species of moth

Eupithecia rigouti is a moth in the family Geometridae.
