= Olepa anomi =

Scientific classification
- Domain: Eukaryota
- Kingdom: Animalia
- Phylum: Arthropoda
- Class: Insecta
- Order: Lepidoptera
- Superfamily: Noctuoidea
- Family: Erebidae
- Subfamily: Arctiinae
- Genus: Olepa
- Species: O. anomi

Binomial name
- Olepa anomi Orhant, 1986

Species of moth

Olepa anomi is a moth of the family Erebidae first described by Orhant in 1986. It is found in Sri Lanka.
