= Cychrus songpanensis =

Scientific classification
- Domain: Eukaryota
- Kingdom: Animalia
- Phylum: Arthropoda
- Class: Insecta
- Order: Coleoptera
- Suborder: Adephaga
- Family: Carabidae
- Subfamily: Carabinae
- Tribe: Cychrini
- Genus: Cychrus
- Species: C. songpanensis

Binomial name
- Cychrus songpanensis Deuve, 1991

Species of beetle

Cychrus songpanensis is a species in the beetle family Carabidae. It is found in China.

== Subspecies ==
These four subspecies belong to the species Cychrus songpanensis:

- Cychrus songpanensis ambulans Deuve, 1992 (China)
- Cychrus songpanensis songpanensis Deuve, 1991 (China)
- Cychrus songpanensis subtatzaopin Deuve, 2017 (China)
- Cychrus songpanensis tatzaopin Deuve, 1996 (China)
