= Cychrus shankoucola =

Scientific classification
- Domain: Eukaryota
- Kingdom: Animalia
- Phylum: Arthropoda
- Class: Insecta
- Order: Coleoptera
- Suborder: Adephaga
- Family: Carabidae
- Subfamily: Carabinae
- Tribe: Cychrini
- Genus: Cychrus
- Species: C. shankoucola

Binomial name
- Cychrus shankoucola Deuve, 1994

Synonyms
- Cychrus culminalis

Species of beetle

Cychrus shankoucola is a species in the beetle family Carabidae. It is found in China.

== Subspecies ==
These two subspecies belong to the species Cychrus shankoucola:

- Cychrus shankoucola culminalis Cavazzuti, 1997
- Cychrus shankoucola shankoucola Deuve, 1994
