= Cychrus morawitzi =

Scientific classification
- Domain: Eukaryota
- Kingdom: Animalia
- Phylum: Arthropoda
- Class: Insecta
- Order: Coleoptera
- Suborder: Adephaga
- Family: Carabidae
- Subfamily: Carabinae
- Tribe: Cychrini
- Genus: Cychrus
- Species: C. morawitzi

Binomial name
- Cychrus morawitzi Géhin, 1885

Species of beetle

Cychrus morawitzi is a species in the beetle family Carabidae. It is found in China, Japan, and Russia.

== Subspecies ==
These seven subspecies belong to the species Cychrus morawitzi:

- Cychrus morawitzi coreicus Breuning, 1950 (China and North Korea)
- Cychrus morawitzi dolini Deuve, 2010 (Russia)
- Cychrus morawitzi iwatensis Nakane, 1989 (Japan)
- Cychrus morawitzi koltzei Roeschke, 1907 (Russia)
- Cychrus morawitzi morawitzi Géhin, 1885 (Japan and Russia)
- Cychrus morawitzi otto Imura, 2007 (Japan)
- Cychrus morawitzi sapporensis Nakane, 1989 (Japan)
