= Cychrus auvrayorum =

Scientific classification
- Domain: Eukaryota
- Kingdom: Animalia
- Phylum: Arthropoda
- Class: Insecta
- Order: Coleoptera
- Suborder: Adephaga
- Family: Carabidae
- Subfamily: Carabinae
- Tribe: Cychrini
- Genus: Cychrus
- Species: C. auvrayorum

Binomial name
- Cychrus auvrayorum Deuve & Mourzine, 1997

Synonyms
- Cychrus andrei

Species of beetle

Cychrus auvrayorum is a species in the beetle family Carabidae. It is found in China.

== Subspecies ==
These two subspecies belong to the species Cychrus auvrayorum:

- Cychrus auvrayorum andrei Cavazzuti, 2001
- Cychrus auvrayorum auvrayorum Deuve & Mourzine, 1997
