= Cychrus seriatus =

Scientific classification
- Kingdom: Animalia
- Phylum: Arthropoda
- Class: Insecta
- Order: Coleoptera
- Suborder: Adephaga
- Family: Carabidae
- Genus: Cychrus
- Species: C. seriatus

Binomial name
- Cychrus seriatus Roeschke, 1907

Species of beetle

Cychrus seriatus is a species of ground beetle in the subfamily of Carabinae. It was described by Roeschke in 1907.
