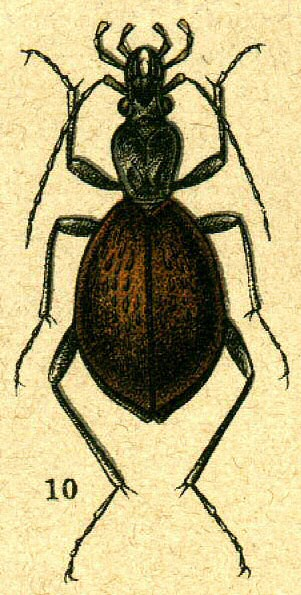

Scientific classification
- Kingdom: Animalia
- Phylum: Arthropoda
- Clade: Pancrustacea
- Class: Insecta
- Order: Coleoptera
- Suborder: Adephaga
- Family: Carabidae
- Genus: Cychrus
- Species: C. aeneus

Binomial name
- Cychrus aeneus Fisher-Waldheim, 1824

= Cychrus aeneus =

Species of beetle

Cychrus aeneus is a species of ground beetle in the subfamily Carabinae. It was described by Fisher-Waldheim in 1824. It is found in the Caucasus region, on the border of Europe and Asia.
