= Cychrus boulbeni =

Scientific classification
- Kingdom: Animalia
- Phylum: Arthropoda
- Class: Insecta
- Order: Coleoptera
- Suborder: Adephaga
- Family: Carabidae
- Genus: Cychrus
- Species: C. boulbeni

Binomial name
- Cychrus boulbeni Deuve, 1997

Species of beetle

Cychrus boulbeni is a species of ground beetle in the subfamily of Carabinae that can be found in northern part of Sichuan, province of China. It was described by Deuve in 1997.
