= Cychrus liei =

Scientific classification
- Domain: Eukaryota
- Kingdom: Animalia
- Phylum: Arthropoda
- Class: Insecta
- Order: Coleoptera
- Suborder: Adephaga
- Family: Carabidae
- Genus: Cychrus
- Species: C. liei

Binomial name
- Cychrus liei Klienfeld, 2003

Species of beetle

Cychrus liei is a species of ground beetle in the subfamily of Carabinae. It was described by Klienfeld in 2003.
