= Cychrus schneideri =

Scientific classification
- Domain: Eukaryota
- Kingdom: Animalia
- Phylum: Arthropoda
- Class: Insecta
- Order: Coleoptera
- Suborder: Adephaga
- Family: Carabidae
- Genus: Cychrus
- Species: C. schneideri

Binomial name
- Cychrus schneideri Imura, 1997

Species of beetle

Cychrus schneideri is a species of ground beetle in the subfamily of Carabinae. It was described by Imura in 1997.
