= Cychrus chareti =

Scientific classification
- Kingdom: Animalia
- Phylum: Arthropoda
- Class: Insecta
- Order: Coleoptera
- Suborder: Adephaga
- Family: Carabidae
- Genus: Cychrus
- Species: C. chareti

Binomial name
- Cychrus chareti Deuve, 1994

Species of beetle

Cychrus chareti is a species of ground beetle in the subfamily of Carabinae that can be found in Sichuan and Yunnan provinces of China. It was described by Deuve in 1994.
