= Cychrus zhoui =

Scientific classification
- Domain: Eukaryota
- Kingdom: Animalia
- Phylum: Arthropoda
- Class: Insecta
- Order: Coleoptera
- Suborder: Adephaga
- Family: Carabidae
- Genus: Cychrus
- Species: C. zhoui

Binomial name
- Cychrus zhoui Imura, Su & Osawa, 1998

Species of beetle

Cychrus zhoui is a species of ground beetle in the subfamily of Carabinae. It was described by Imura, Su & Osawa in 1998.
