= Cychrus turnai =

Scientific classification
- Kingdom: Animalia
- Phylum: Arthropoda
- Class: Insecta
- Order: Coleoptera
- Suborder: Adephaga
- Family: Carabidae
- Genus: Cychrus
- Species: C. turnai

Binomial name
- Cychrus turnai Deuve, 1994

Species of beetle

Cychrus turnai is a species of ground beetle in the subfamily Carabinae that is endemic to Sichuan province in China. It was described by Deuve in 1994.
