= Cychrus angustior =

Scientific classification
- Kingdom: Animalia
- Phylum: Arthropoda
- Clade: Pancrustacea
- Class: Insecta
- Order: Coleoptera
- Suborder: Adephaga
- Family: Carabidae
- Genus: Cychrus
- Species: C. angustior

Binomial name
- Cychrus angustior Kleinfeld, 2000

Species of beetle

Cychrus angustior is a species of ground beetle in the subfamily Carabinae. It was described by Kleinfeld in 2000.
