= Cychrus anatolicus =

Scientific classification
- Kingdom: Animalia
- Phylum: Arthropoda
- Clade: Pancrustacea
- Class: Insecta
- Order: Coleoptera
- Suborder: Adephaga
- Family: Carabidae
- Genus: Cychrus
- Species: C. anatolicus

Binomial name
- Cychrus anatolicus Motschulsky, 1865

Synonyms
- Cychrus armeniacus; Cychrus korgei

Species of beetle

Cychrus anatolicus is a species of ground beetle in the subfamily Carabinae. It was described by Victor Motschulsky in 1865. The species can be found in Armenia and Turkey.

== Subspecies ==
These seven subspecies belong to the species Cychrus anatolicus:

- Cychrus anatolicus anatolicus Motschulsky, 1866
- Cychrus anatolicus frivaldszkyi Roeschke, 1907
- Cychrus anatolicus ilgazdaghensis Maran, 1932
- Cychrus anatolicus korgei Breuning, 1964
- Cychrus anatolicus occidentalis Mandl, 1977
- Cychrus anatolicus ponticus Schweiger, 1962
- Cychrus anatolicus ziyathi Cavazzuti, 2003
