= Cychrus thibetanus =

Scientific classification
- Kingdom: Animalia
- Phylum: Arthropoda
- Class: Insecta
- Order: Coleoptera
- Suborder: Adephaga
- Family: Carabidae
- Genus: Cychrus
- Species: C. thibetanus

Binomial name
- Cychrus thibetanus Fairmaire, 1893

Species of beetle

Cychrus thibetanus is a species of ground beetle in the subfamily of Carabinae. It was described by Fairmaire in 1893.
