= Cychrus yunnanus =

Scientific classification
- Kingdom: Animalia
- Phylum: Arthropoda
- Class: Insecta
- Order: Coleoptera
- Suborder: Adephaga
- Family: Carabidae
- Genus: Cychrus
- Species: C. yunnanus

Binomial name
- Cychrus yunnanus Fairmaire, 1887

Synonyms
- Cychrus gorodinskii Cavazzuti, 2001

Species of beetle

Cychrus yunnanus is a species of ground beetle in the subfamily Carabinae that can be found in Sichuan and Yunnan provinces of China. It was described by Fairmaire in 1887.
