= Cychrus jinchuanensis =

Scientific classification
- Domain: Eukaryota
- Kingdom: Animalia
- Phylum: Arthropoda
- Class: Insecta
- Order: Coleoptera
- Suborder: Adephaga
- Family: Carabidae
- Genus: Cychrus
- Species: C. jinchuanensis

Binomial name
- Cychrus jinchuanensis Deuve & Tian, 2007

Species of beetle

Cychrus jinchuanensis is a species of ground beetle in the subfamily of Carabinae. It was described by Deuve & Tian in 2007.

Northern Hemisphere, with about 115 species (Lorenz 2005: 64–66) in the Nearctic (two western species) and Palaearctic Regions.
