= Cychrus zoigeicus =

Scientific classification
- Kingdom: Animalia
- Phylum: Arthropoda
- Class: Insecta
- Order: Coleoptera
- Suborder: Adephaga
- Family: Carabidae
- Genus: Cychrus
- Species: C. zoigeicus

Binomial name
- Cychrus zoigeicus Deuve, 1990

Species of beetle

Cychrus zoigeicus is a species of ground beetle in the subfamily of Carabinae. It was described by Thierry Deuve in 1990. It occurs in China.

== Subspecies ==
Five subspecies are recognized:

- Cychrus zoigeicus zoigeicus Deuve, 1990
- Cychrus zoigeicus ivanrapuzzii Cavazzuti, 2007
- Cychrus zoigeicus mewaensis Deuve, 1997
- Cychrus zoigeicus soazigae Deuve, 1997
- Cychrus zoigeicus zhanglaicus Deuve, 2001
