= Cychrus kaznakovi =

Scientific classification
- Domain: Eukaryota
- Kingdom: Animalia
- Phylum: Arthropoda
- Class: Insecta
- Order: Coleoptera
- Suborder: Adephaga
- Family: Carabidae
- Genus: Cychrus
- Species: C. kaznakovi

Binomial name
- Cychrus kaznakovi Semenov & Znoiko, 1934

Species of beetle

Cychrus kaznakovi is a species of ground beetle in the subfamily of Carabinae. It was described by Semenov & Znoiko in 1934.
