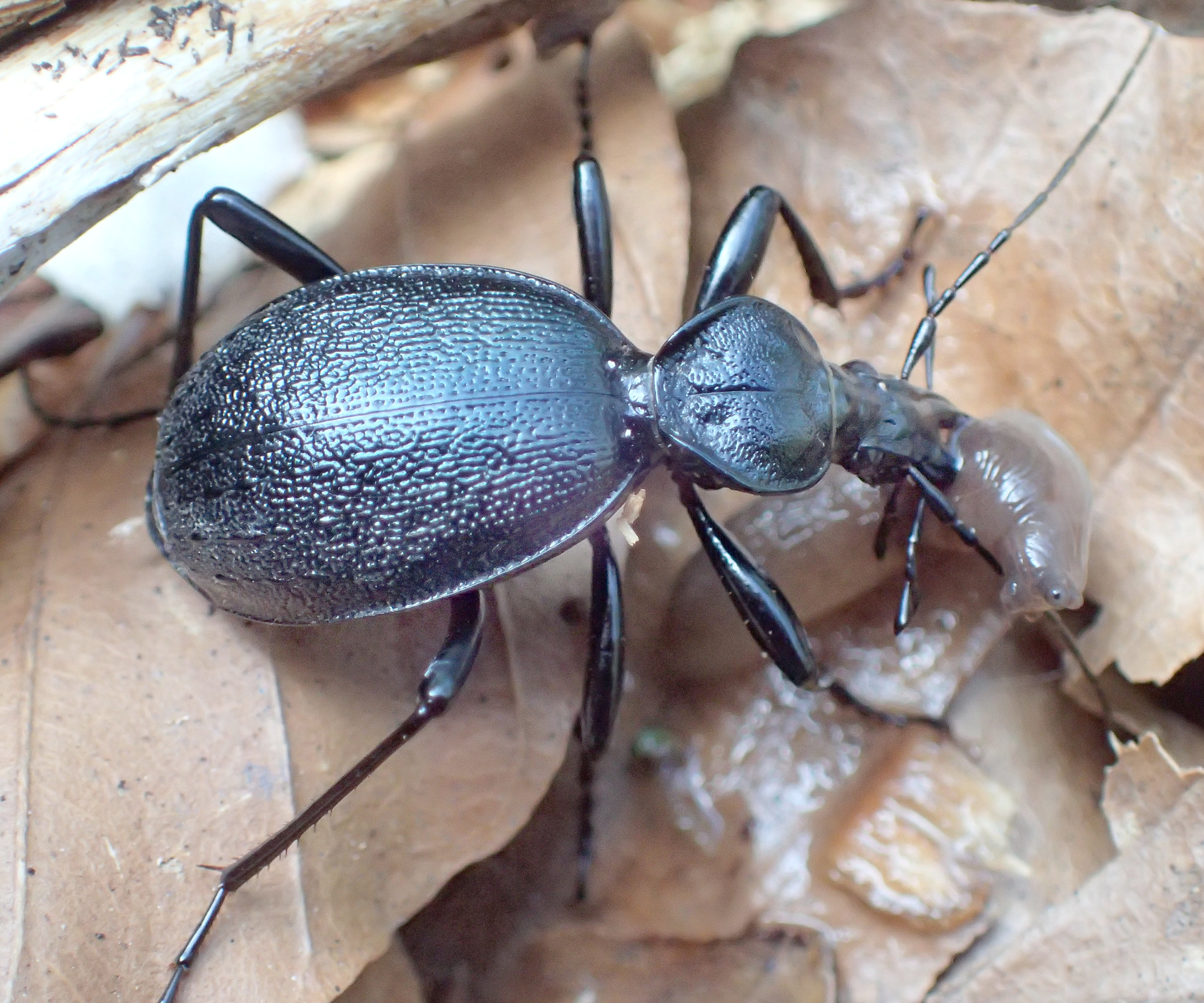

Scientific classification
- Domain: Eukaryota
- Kingdom: Animalia
- Phylum: Arthropoda
- Class: Insecta
- Order: Coleoptera
- Suborder: Adephaga
- Family: Carabidae
- Genus: Cychrus
- Species: C. semigranosus

Binomial name
- Cychrus semigranosus Palliardi, 1825

= Cychrus semigranosus =

Species of beetle

Cychrus semigranosus is a species of ground beetle in the subfamily of Carabinae. It was described by Palliardi in 1825.
