= Cychrus szetshuanus =

Scientific classification
- Kingdom: Animalia
- Phylum: Arthropoda
- Class: Insecta
- Order: Coleoptera
- Suborder: Adephaga
- Family: Carabidae
- Genus: Cychrus
- Species: C. szetshuanus

Binomial name
- Cychrus szetshuanus Breuning, 1931

Species of beetle

Cychrus szetshuanus is a species of ground beetle in the subfamily of Carabinae. It was described by Stephan von Breuning in 1931.
