= Cychrus grajus =

Scientific classification
- Domain: Eukaryota
- Kingdom: Animalia
- Phylum: Arthropoda
- Class: Insecta
- Order: Coleoptera
- Suborder: Adephaga
- Family: Carabidae
- Genus: Cychrus
- Species: C. grajus

Binomial name
- Cychrus grajus K. Daniel & J. Daniel, 1898

Species of beetle

Cychrus grajus is a species of ground beetle in the subfamily of Carabinae. It was described by K. Daniel & J. Daniel in 1898.
