= Cychrus angulicollis =

Scientific classification
- Kingdom: Animalia
- Phylum: Arthropoda
- Clade: Pancrustacea
- Class: Insecta
- Order: Coleoptera
- Suborder: Adephaga
- Family: Carabidae
- Genus: Cychrus
- Species: C. angulicollis

Binomial name
- Cychrus angulicollis Stella, 1874

Species of beetle

Cychrus angulicollis is a species of ground beetle in the subfamily Carabinae. It was described by Stella in 1874. The species can be found in France and Italy.
