= Cychrus signatus =

Scientific classification
- Domain: Eukaryota
- Kingdom: Animalia
- Phylum: Arthropoda
- Class: Insecta
- Order: Coleoptera
- Suborder: Adephaga
- Family: Carabidae
- Genus: Cychrus
- Species: C. signatus

Binomial name
- Cychrus signatus Faldermann, 1835

Species of beetle

Cychrus signatus is a species of ground beetle in the subfamily of Carabinae. It was described by Faldermann in 1835.
