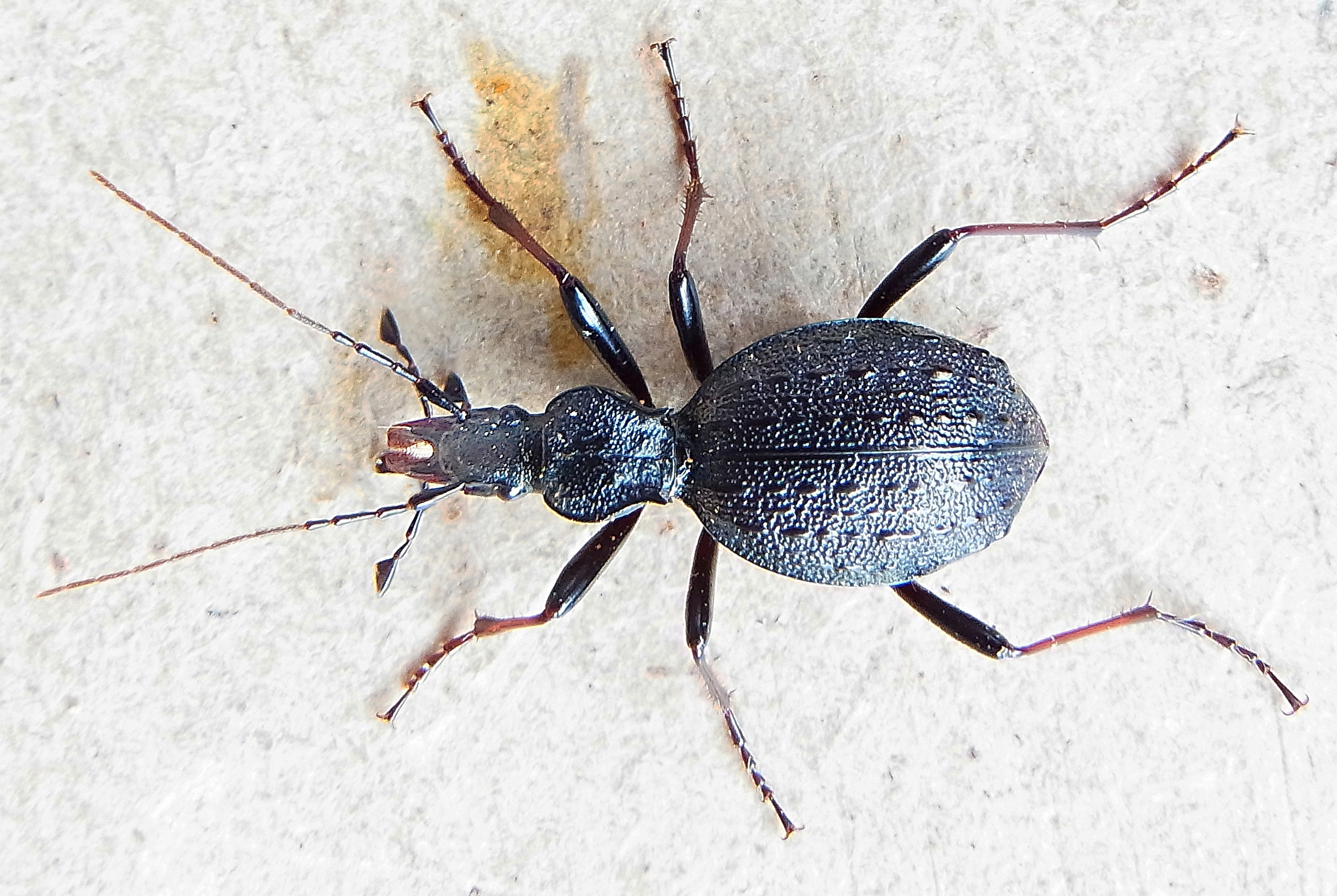

Scientific classification
- Domain: Eukaryota
- Kingdom: Animalia
- Phylum: Arthropoda
- Class: Insecta
- Order: Coleoptera
- Suborder: Adephaga
- Family: Carabidae
- Genus: Cychrus
- Species: C. spinicollis

Binomial name
- Cychrus spinicollis L. Dufour, 1857

= Cychrus spinicollis =

Species of beetle

Cychrus spinicollis is a species of ground beetle in the subfamily of Carabinae. It was described by L. Dufour in 1857.

== Distribution ==
This beetle is endemic to North-Western Spain.
