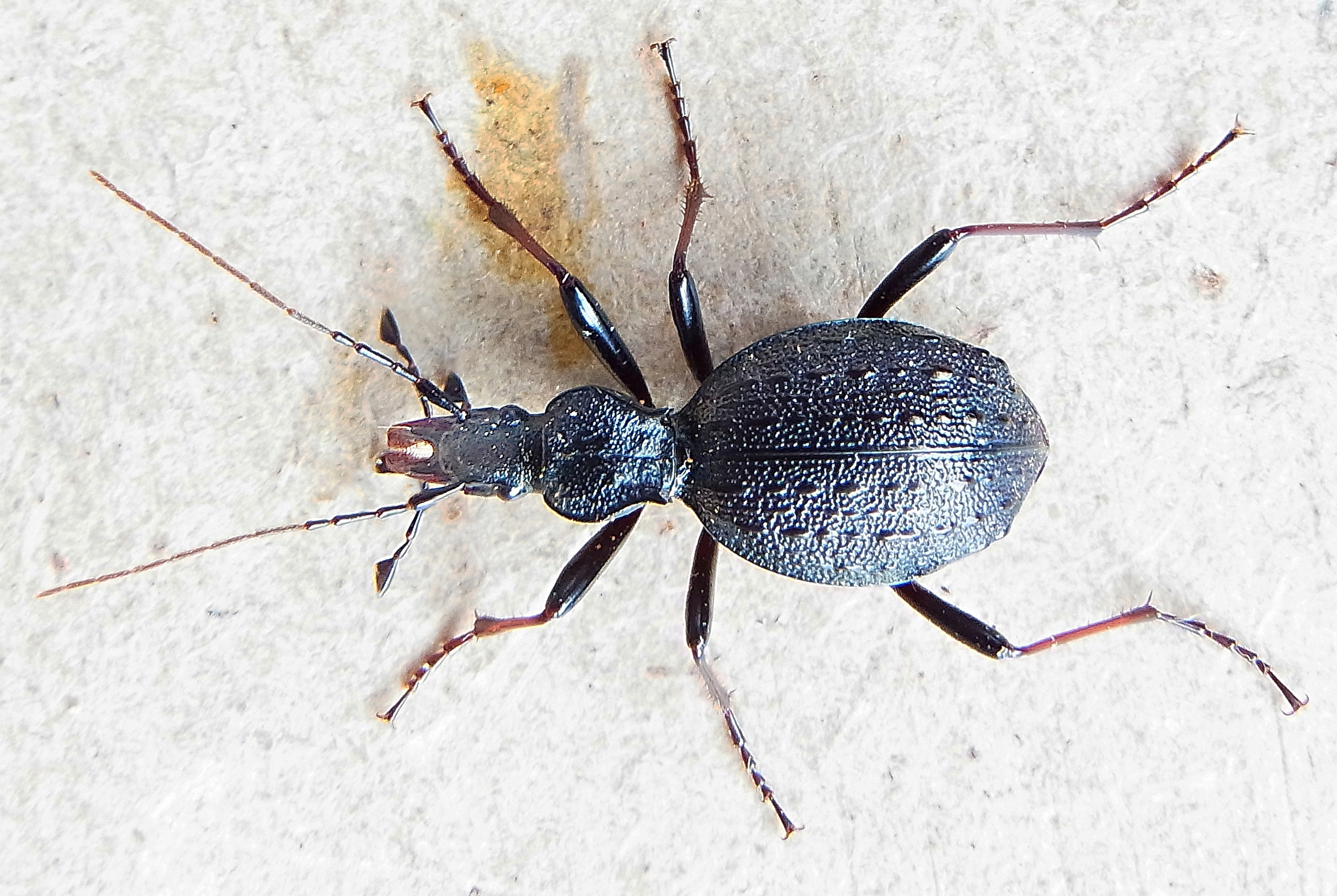

Scientific classification
- Domain: Eukaryota
- Kingdom: Animalia
- Phylum: Arthropoda
- Class: Insecta
- Order: Coleoptera
- Suborder: Adephaga
- Family: Carabidae
- Genus: Cychrus
- Species: C. dufouri

Binomial name
- Cychrus dufouri Chaudoir, 1869

= Cychrus dufouri =

Species of beetle

Cychrus dufouri is a species of ground beetle in the subfamily of Carabinae. It was described by Maximilien Chaudoir in 1869.
