= Cychrus hemphillii =

Scientific classification
- Domain: Eukaryota
- Kingdom: Animalia
- Phylum: Arthropoda
- Class: Insecta
- Order: Coleoptera
- Suborder: Adephaga
- Family: Carabidae
- Genus: Cychrus
- Species: C. hemphillii

Binomial name
- Cychrus hemphillii Horn, 1878

Species of beetle

Cychrus hemphillii is a species of ground beetle in the subfamily of Carabinae. It was described by George Henry Horn in 1878. This species is found in the United States and Canada.

== Subspecies ==
- Cychrus hemphillii hemphillii (Idaho, Utah, Wyoming) - Hemphill's rare snail-eating beetle
- Cychrus hemphillii rickseckeri LeConte, 1884 (British Columbia, Idaho, Montana, Oregon, Utah, Washington) - Ricksecker's rare snail-eating beetle
