= Cychrus pangi =

Scientific classification
- Domain: Eukaryota
- Kingdom: Animalia
- Phylum: Arthropoda
- Class: Insecta
- Order: Coleoptera
- Suborder: Adephaga
- Family: Carabidae
- Genus: Cychrus
- Species: C. pangi

Binomial name
- Cychrus pangi Deuve & Tian, 2004

Species of beetle

Cychrus pangi is a species of ground beetle in the subfamily of Carabinae. It was described by Deuve & Tian in 2004.

== Etymology ==
Uncertain, possibly from Cychreus, son of Poseidon and Salamis, or from Cychros, a city in Thrace near a lake whose water was unhealthy. Duméril (1823: 167) stated that Cychros was the name of a bird (probably in Pliny the Elder), but this hasn't been proven.
