= Cychrus stoetzneri =

Scientific classification
- Domain: Eukaryota
- Kingdom: Animalia
- Phylum: Arthropoda
- Class: Insecta
- Order: Coleoptera
- Suborder: Adephaga
- Family: Carabidae
- Genus: Cychrus
- Species: C. stoetzneri

Binomial name
- Cychrus stoetzneri Roeschke, 1923

Species of beetle

Cychrus stoetzneri is a species of ground beetle in the subfamily of Carabinae. It was described by Roeschke in 1923. The species is named after Walther Stötzner who led an expedition into China during which the first described specimens were collected.
