= Cychrus yulongxuicus =

Scientific classification
- Kingdom: Animalia
- Phylum: Arthropoda
- Class: Insecta
- Order: Coleoptera
- Suborder: Adephaga
- Family: Carabidae
- Genus: Cychrus
- Species: C. yulongxuicus

Binomial name
- Cychrus yulongxuicus Deuve, 1990

Species of beetle

Cychrus yulongxuicus is a species of ground beetle in the subfamily of Carabinae that is endemic to the Sichuan province of China. It was described by Deuve in 1990.
