= Cychrus kozlovi =

Scientific classification
- Domain: Eukaryota
- Kingdom: Animalia
- Phylum: Arthropoda
- Class: Insecta
- Order: Coleoptera
- Suborder: Adephaga
- Family: Carabidae
- Genus: Cychrus
- Species: C. kozlovi

Binomial name
- Cychrus kozlovi Semenov & Znojko, 1934

Species of beetle

Cychrus kozlovi is a species of ground beetle in the subfamily of Carabinae. It was described by Semenov and Znojko in 1934.
