= Cychrus pratti =

Scientific classification
- Kingdom: Animalia
- Phylum: Arthropoda
- Class: Insecta
- Order: Coleoptera
- Suborder: Adephaga
- Family: Carabidae
- Genus: Cychrus
- Species: C. pratti

Binomial name
- Cychrus pratti Breuning, 1946

Species of beetle

Cychrus pratti is a species of ground beetle in the subfamily of Carabinae. It was described by Breuning in 1946.
