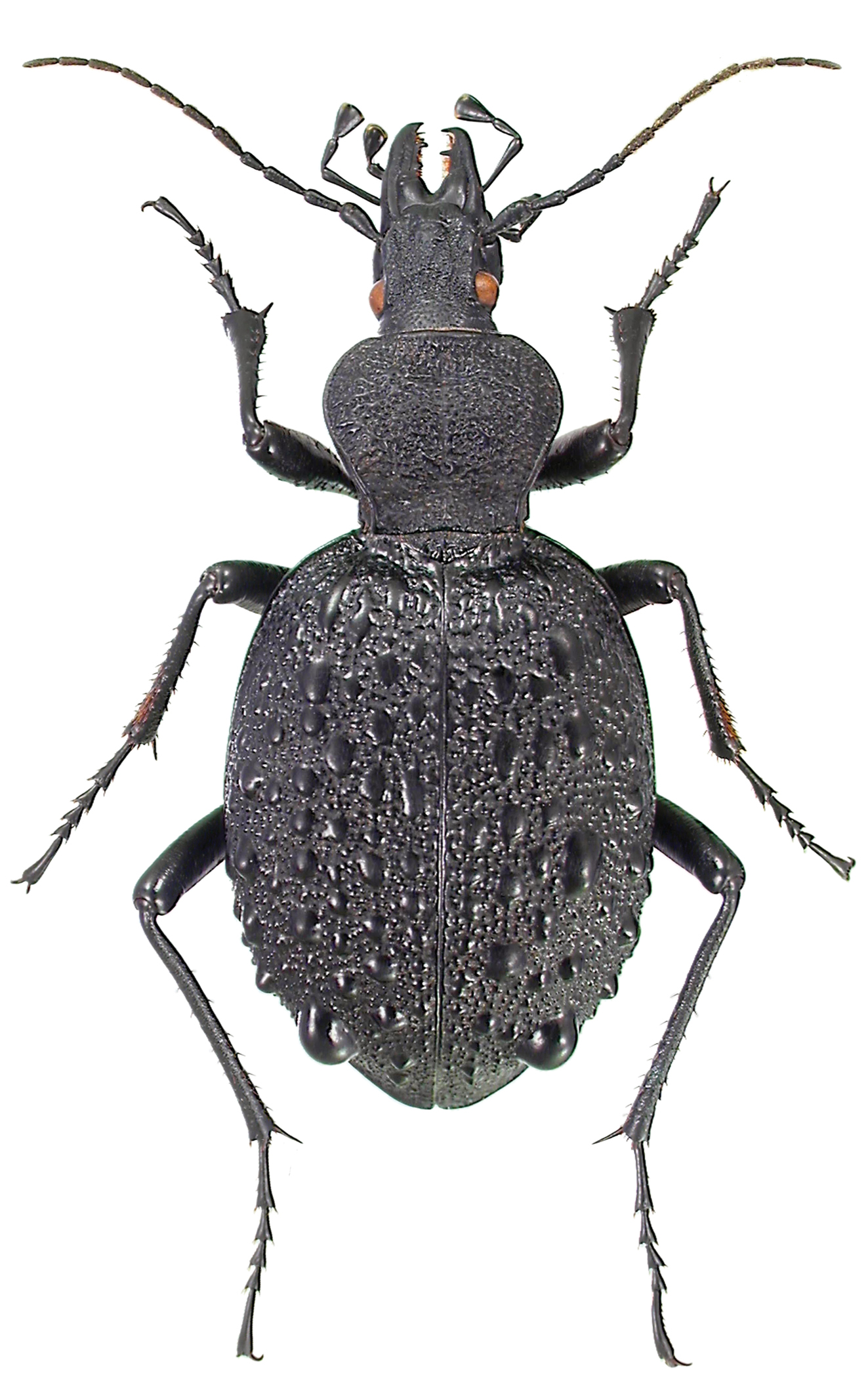

Scientific classification
- Domain: Eukaryota
- Kingdom: Animalia
- Phylum: Arthropoda
- Class: Insecta
- Order: Coleoptera
- Suborder: Adephaga
- Family: Carabidae
- Genus: Cychrus
- Species: C. tuberculatus

Binomial name
- Cychrus tuberculatus Harris, 1839

Synonyms
- Cychrus pustulosus Casey, 1905

= Cychrus tuberculatus =

Species of beetle

Cychrus tuberculatus, the tuberculate rare snail-eating beetle, is a species of ground beetle in the subfamily Carabinae. It was described by Thaddeus William Harris in 1839. This species is found in British Columbia, Quebec, California, Oregon and Washington, where it inhabits coniferous forests, forest clearings and moraines.

Adults are brachypterous and nocturnal. They prey on snails.
