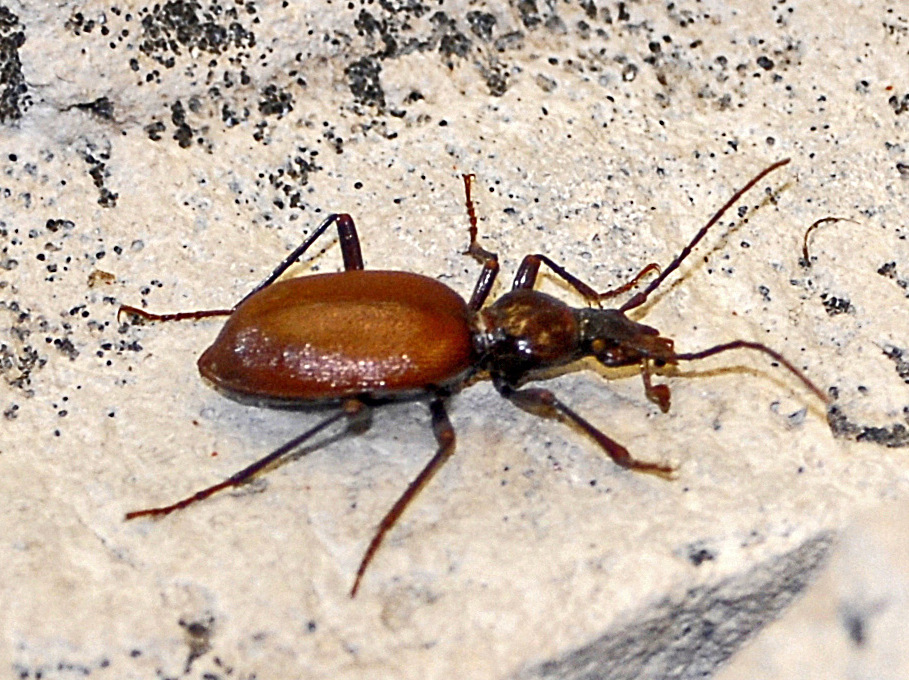

Scientific classification
- Kingdom: Animalia
- Phylum: Arthropoda
- Clade: Pancrustacea
- Class: Insecta
- Order: Coleoptera
- Suborder: Adephaga
- Family: Carabidae
- Genus: Cychrus
- Species: C. angustatus

Binomial name
- Cychrus angustatus Hoppe & Hornschuch, 1825

= Cychrus angustatus =

Species of beetle

Cychrus angustatus is a species of ground beetle in the subfamily Carabinae. It was described by David Heinrich Hoppe and Christian Friedrich Hornschuch in 1825.

== Distribution ==
This species can be found in Austria, Bosnia and Herzegovina, Croatia, France, Italy, Slovenia and Switzerland.
