= Cychrus rugicollis =

Scientific classification
- Domain: Eukaryota
- Kingdom: Animalia
- Phylum: Arthropoda
- Class: Insecta
- Order: Coleoptera
- Suborder: Adephaga
- Family: Carabidae
- Genus: Cychrus
- Species: C. rugicollis

Binomial name
- Cychrus rugicollis K. & J. Daniel, 1898

Species of beetle

Cychrus rugicollis is a species of ground beetle in the subfamily of Carabinae. It was described by K. & J. Daniel in 1898.
