= Cychrus hampei =

Scientific classification
- Domain: Eukaryota
- Kingdom: Animalia
- Phylum: Arthropoda
- Class: Insecta
- Order: Coleoptera
- Suborder: Adephaga
- Family: Carabidae
- Genus: Cychrus
- Species: C. hampei

Binomial name
- Cychrus hampei Gestro, 1875

Synonyms
- Cychrus intermedius Hampe, 1850; Cychrus mosorensis Winkler, 1939; Cychrus punctipennis Reitter, 1901; Cychrus reiseri Apfelbeck, 1904

Species of beetle

Cychrus hampei is a species of ground beetle in the subfamily of Carabinae that can be found in Croatia and in Bosnia and Herzegovina.
