= Cychrus lajinensis =

Scientific classification
- Kingdom: Animalia
- Phylum: Arthropoda
- Clade: Pancrustacea
- Class: Insecta
- Order: Coleoptera
- Suborder: Adephaga
- Family: Carabidae
- Genus: Cychrus
- Species: C. lajinensis

Binomial name
- Cychrus lajinensis Deuve & Tian, 2002

Species of beetle

Cychrus lajinensis is a species of ground beetle in the subfamily Carabinae. It was described by Deuve & Tian in 2002.
