= Cychrus benesi =

Scientific classification
- Kingdom: Animalia
- Phylum: Arthropoda
- Clade: Pancrustacea
- Class: Insecta
- Order: Coleoptera
- Suborder: Adephaga
- Family: Carabidae
- Genus: Cychrus
- Species: C. benesi

Binomial name
- Cychrus benesi Deuve, 1996

Species of beetle

Cychrus benesi is a species of ground beetle in the subfamily Carabinae that is endemic to Sichuan, province of China. It was described by Deuve in 1997.
