= Semelai =

Semelai may be,

- Semelai people
- Semelai language

== See also ==
- Cychrus semelai, a species of beetle
