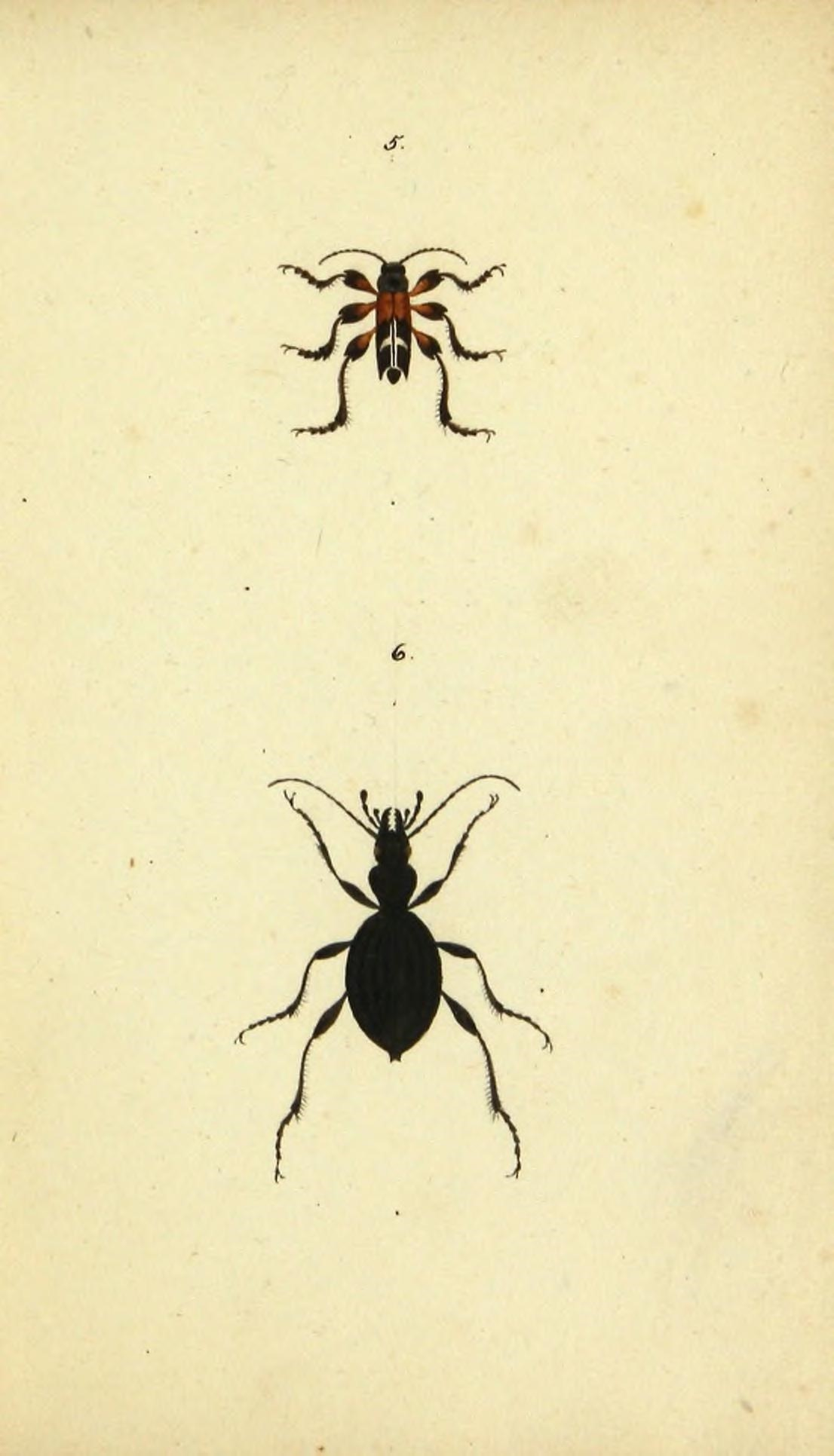
- Cychrus italicus

Scientific classification
- Domain: Eukaryota
- Kingdom: Animalia
- Phylum: Arthropoda
- Class: Insecta
- Order: Coleoptera
- Suborder: Adephaga
- Family: Carabidae
- Genus: Cychrus
- Species: C. italicus

Binomial name
- Cychrus italicus Bonelli, 1810

= Cychrus italicus =

Species of beetle

Cychrus italicus is a species of ground beetle in the subfamily of Carabinae. It was described by Bonelli in 1810.
