= Cychrus sehnali =

Scientific classification
- Domain: Eukaryota
- Kingdom: Animalia
- Phylum: Arthropoda
- Class: Insecta
- Order: Coleoptera
- Suborder: Adephaga
- Family: Carabidae
- Genus: Cychrus
- Species: C. sehnali

Binomial name
- Cychrus sehnali Haeckel, 2007

Species of beetle

Cychrus sehnali is a species of ground beetle in the subfamily of Carabinae. It was described by Haeckel in 2007.
