= Cychrus bispinosus =

Scientific classification
- Kingdom: Animalia
- Phylum: Arthropoda
- Class: Insecta
- Order: Coleoptera
- Suborder: Adephaga
- Family: Carabidae
- Genus: Cychrus
- Species: C. bispinosus

Binomial name
- Cychrus bispinosus Deuve, 1989

Species of beetle

Cychrus bispinosus is a species of ground beetle in the subfamily of Carabinae that can be found in the following Chinese provinces: Gansu, Henan, Hubei, Shaanxi, and Sichuan. It was described by Deuve in 1989.
