= Cychrus puetzi =

Scientific classification
- Domain: Eukaryota
- Kingdom: Animalia
- Phylum: Arthropoda
- Class: Insecta
- Order: Coleoptera
- Suborder: Adephaga
- Family: Carabidae
- Genus: Cychrus
- Species: C. puetzi

Binomial name
- Cychrus puetzi Klienfeld, Korell & Wrase, 1996

Species of beetle

Cychrus puetzi is a species of ground beetle in the subfamily of Carabinae. It was described by Klienfeld, Korell & Wrase in 1996.
