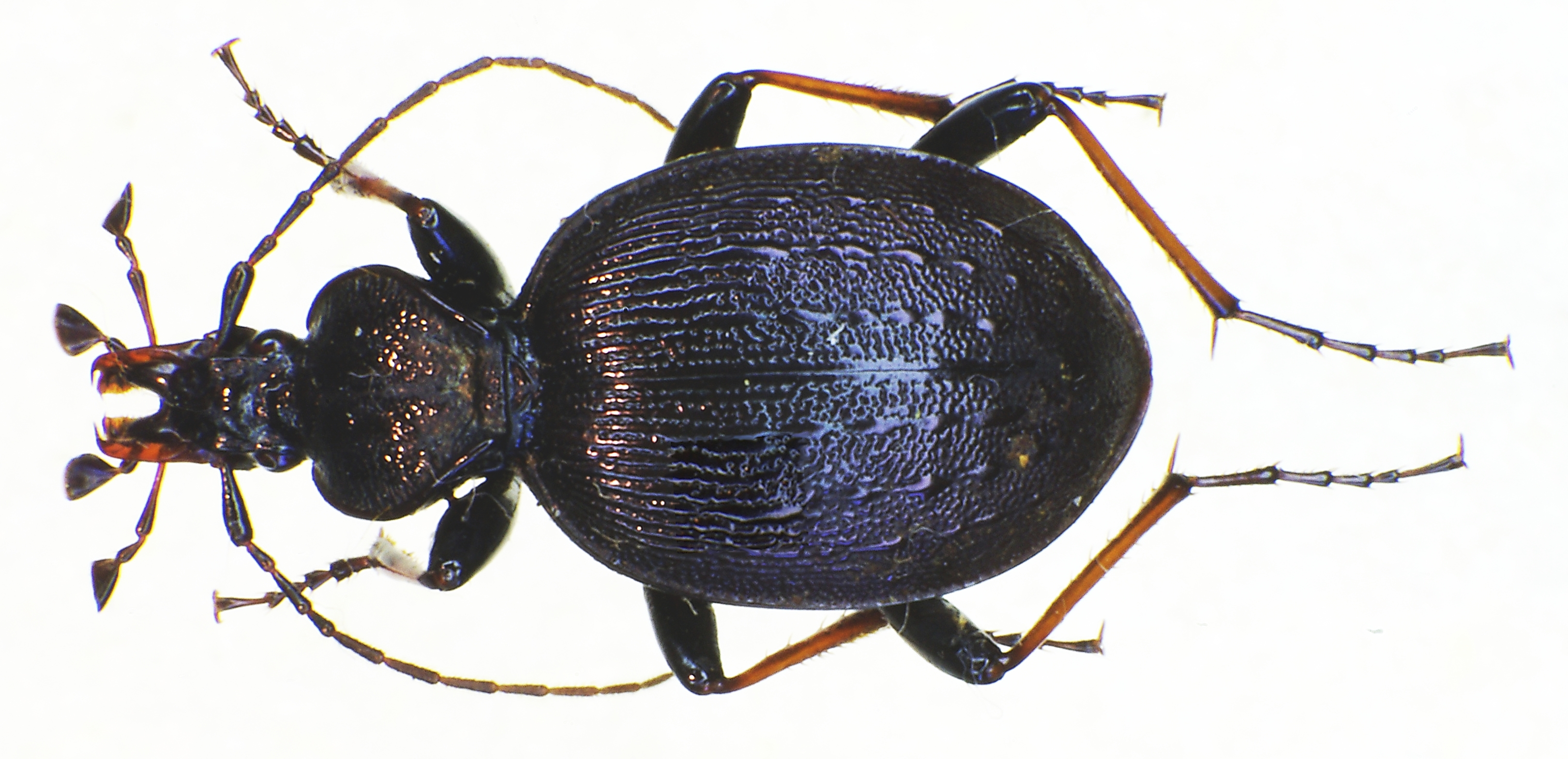

Scientific classification
- Kingdom: Animalia
- Phylum: Arthropoda
- Clade: Pancrustacea
- Class: Insecta
- Order: Coleoptera
- Suborder: Adephaga
- Family: Carabidae
- Genus: Cychrus
- Species: C. attenuatus

Binomial name
- Cychrus attenuatus (Fabricius, 1792)

= Cychrus attenuatus =

Species of beetle

Cychrus attenuatus is a species of beetle in the family Carabidae that is endemic to Europe. It is found in Austria, Belgium, Bosnia and Herzegovina, Croatia, the Czech Republic, mainland France, Germany, Hungary, mainland Italy, Liechtenstein, Luxembourg, Moldova, North Macedonia, Poland, Romania, Slovakia, Slovenia, Switzerland, and Ukraine.
