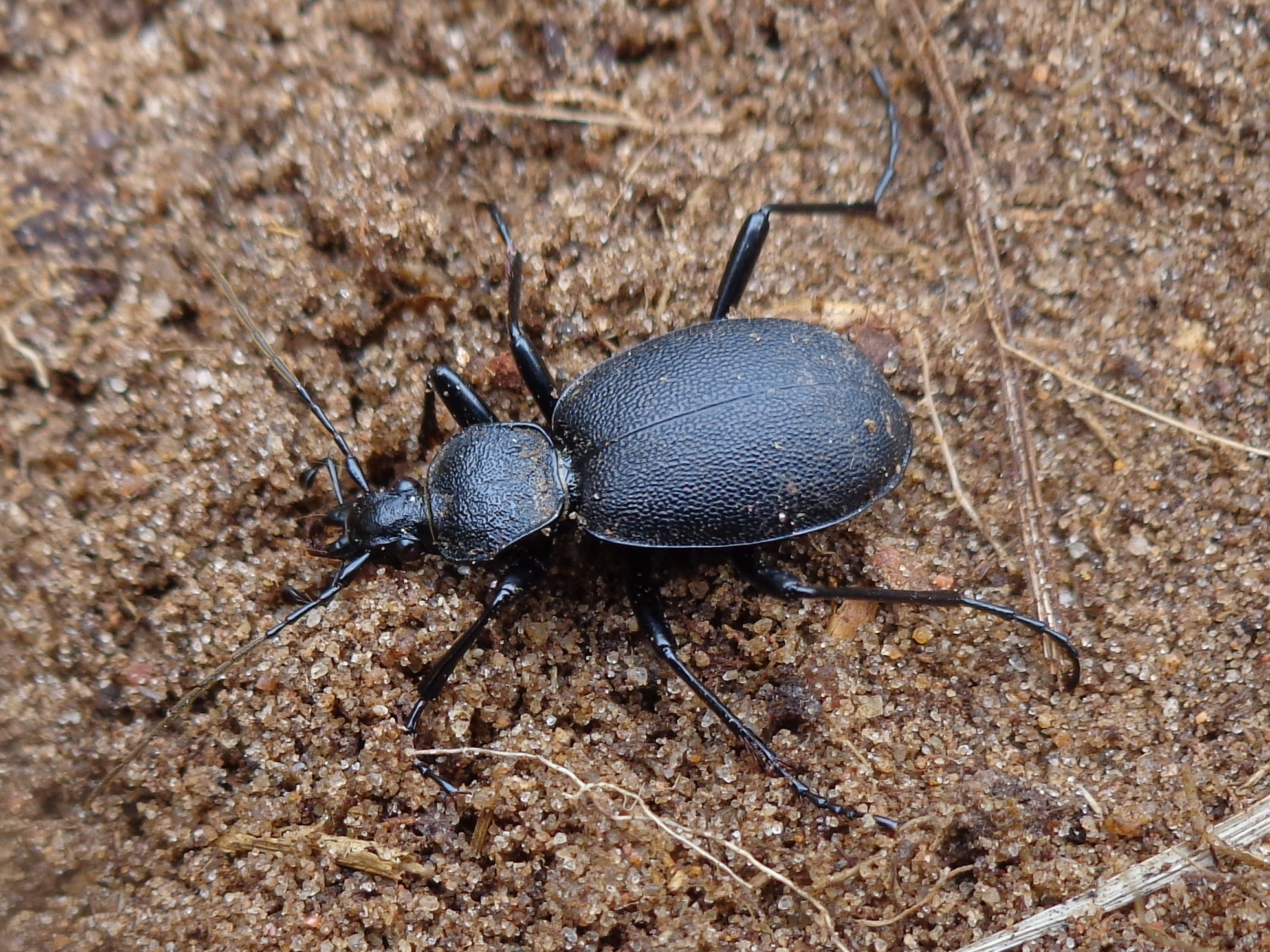

Scientific classification
- Kingdom: Animalia
- Phylum: Arthropoda
- Class: Insecta
- Order: Coleoptera
- Suborder: Adephaga
- Family: Carabidae
- Genus: Cychrus
- Species: C. caraboides

Binomial name
- Cychrus caraboides (Linnaeus, 1758)

Synonyms
- Cychrus rostratus

= Cychrus caraboides =

Species of beetle

Cychrus caraboides is a species of ground beetle.

It is found in Belarus, Benelux, Great Britain including the Isle of Man, Estonia, Finland, mainland France, Hungary, the Republic of Ireland, Kaliningrad, Latvia, Moldova, Northern Ireland, Romania, Russia, mainland Spain, Ukraine, Scandinavia, the Balkans, and everywhere in Central Europe.
