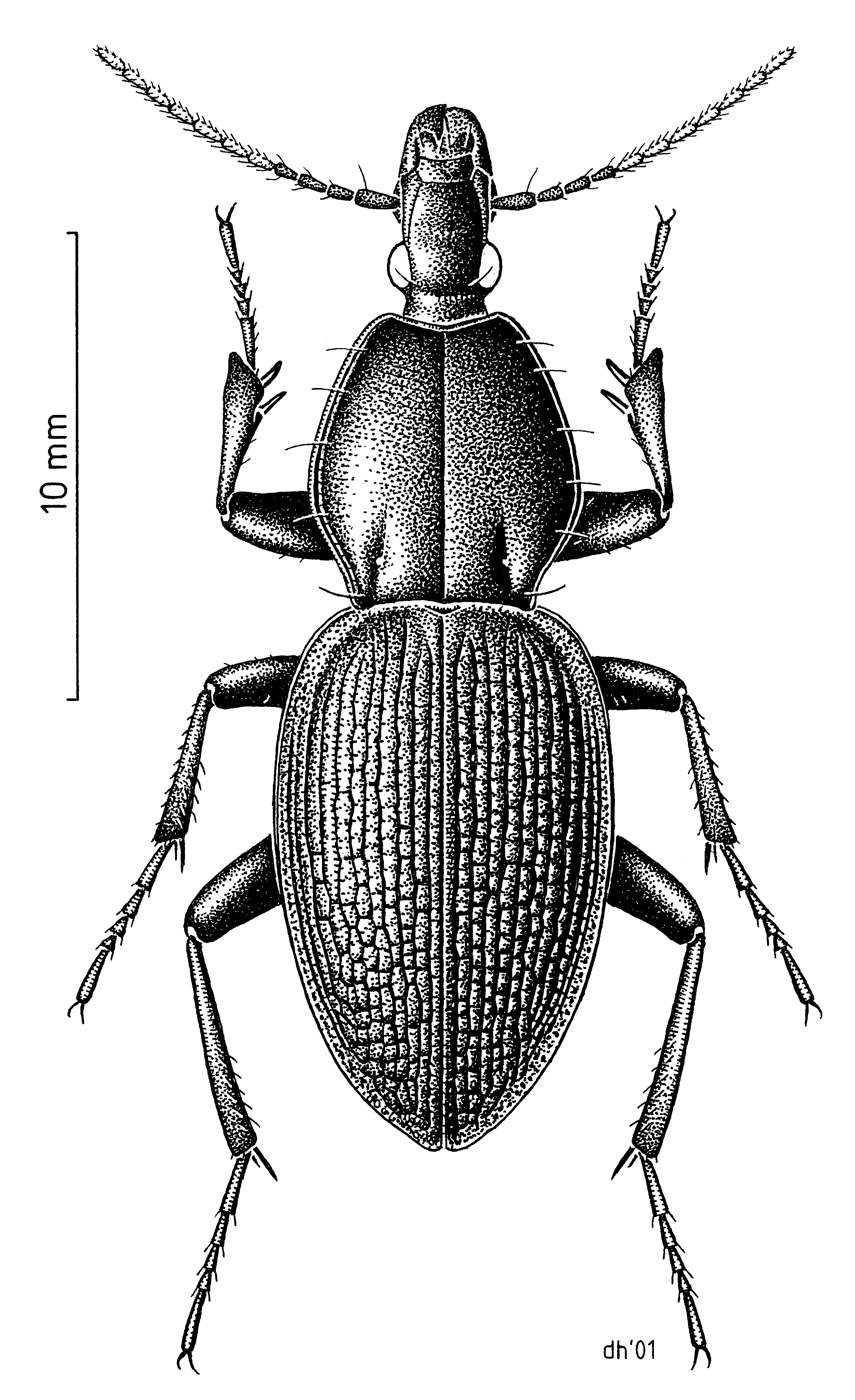
- Illustration by Des Helmore

Scientific classification
- Kingdom: Animalia
- Phylum: Arthropoda
- Clade: Pancrustacea
- Class: Insecta
- Order: Coleoptera
- Suborder: Adephaga
- Family: Carabidae
- Genus: Maoripamborus; Brookes, 1944
- Species: M. fairburni

Binomial name
- Maoripamborus fairburni Brookes, 1944

= Maoripamborus =

Genus of beetles

Maoripamborus fairburni Brookes 1944 is a New Zealand endemic species of beetle (Coleoptera) in the family Carabidae, and within the tribe Pamborini. This is a monotypic genus, although there have been some unsubstantiated suggestions of additional undescribed species. The genus is found in the western areas of the Waikato, east Auckland (Hunua Ranges) and Northland, North Island of New Zealand and is sister taxon (closely related) to the Australian genus Pamborus. A Gondwana association.
