= Pamborus =

Scientific classification
- Kingdom: Animalia
- Phylum: Arthropoda
- Class: Insecta
- Order: Coleoptera
- Suborder: Adephaga
- Family: Carabidae
- Subfamily: Carabinae
- Tribe: Cychrini
- Subtribe: Pamborina
- Genus: Pamborus; Latreille, 1812

Genus of beetles

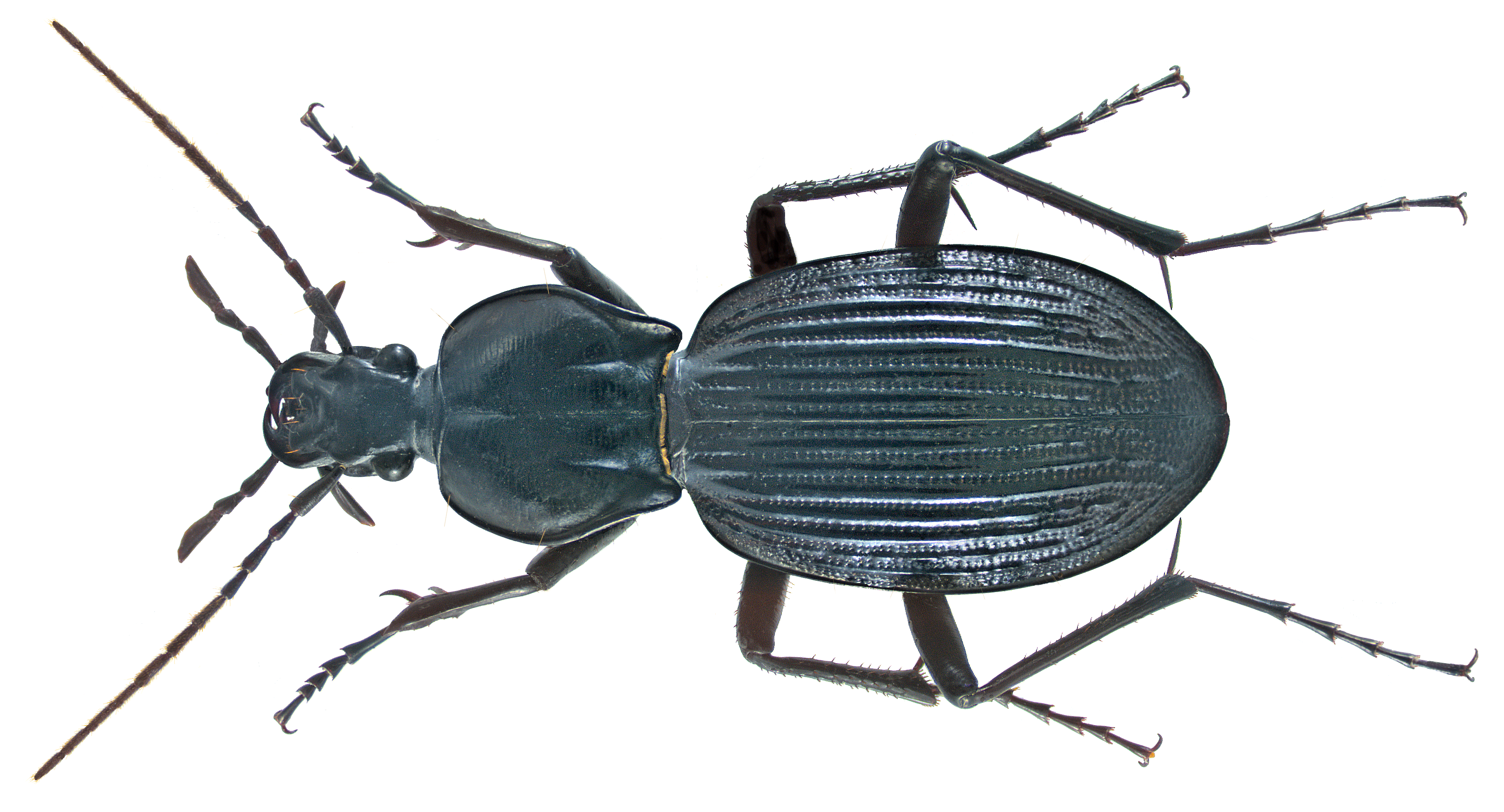
Pamborus alternans

Pamborus is a genus in the beetle family Carabidae. There are about 16 described species in Pamborus, found in Australia.

== Species ==
These 16 species belong to the genus Pamborus:

- Pamborus alternans Latreille in Olivier, 1812
- Pamborus brisbanensis Laporte, 1867
- Pamborus cooloolensis Takami & Sota, 2006
- Pamborus elegans Sloane, 1915
- Pamborus euopacus Takami & Sota, 2006
- Pamborus guerinii Gory, 1831
- Pamborus macleayi Laporte, 1867
- Pamborus monteithi Takami & Sota, 2006
- Pamborus moorei Takami & Sota, 2006
- Pamborus opacus Géhin, 1885
- Pamborus pradierii Chaudoir, 1869
- Pamborus punctatus Darlington, 1961
- Pamborus subtropicus Darlington, 1961
- Pamborus transitus Darlington, 1961
- Pamborus tropicus Darlington, 1961
- Pamborus viridis Gory, 1836
