= Cychrini =

- Scaphinotus petersi

Scientific classification
- Kingdom: Animalia
- Phylum: Arthropoda
- Clade: Pancrustacea
- Class: Insecta
- Order: Coleoptera
- Suborder: Adephaga
- Family: Carabidae
- Subfamily: Carabinae
- Tribe: Cychrini; Perty, 1830

Subtribes
- Cychrina Pamborina

Tribe of beetles

Cychrini is a tribe of ground beetles in the family Carabidae. There are about 6 genera and more than 300 described species in Cychrini.

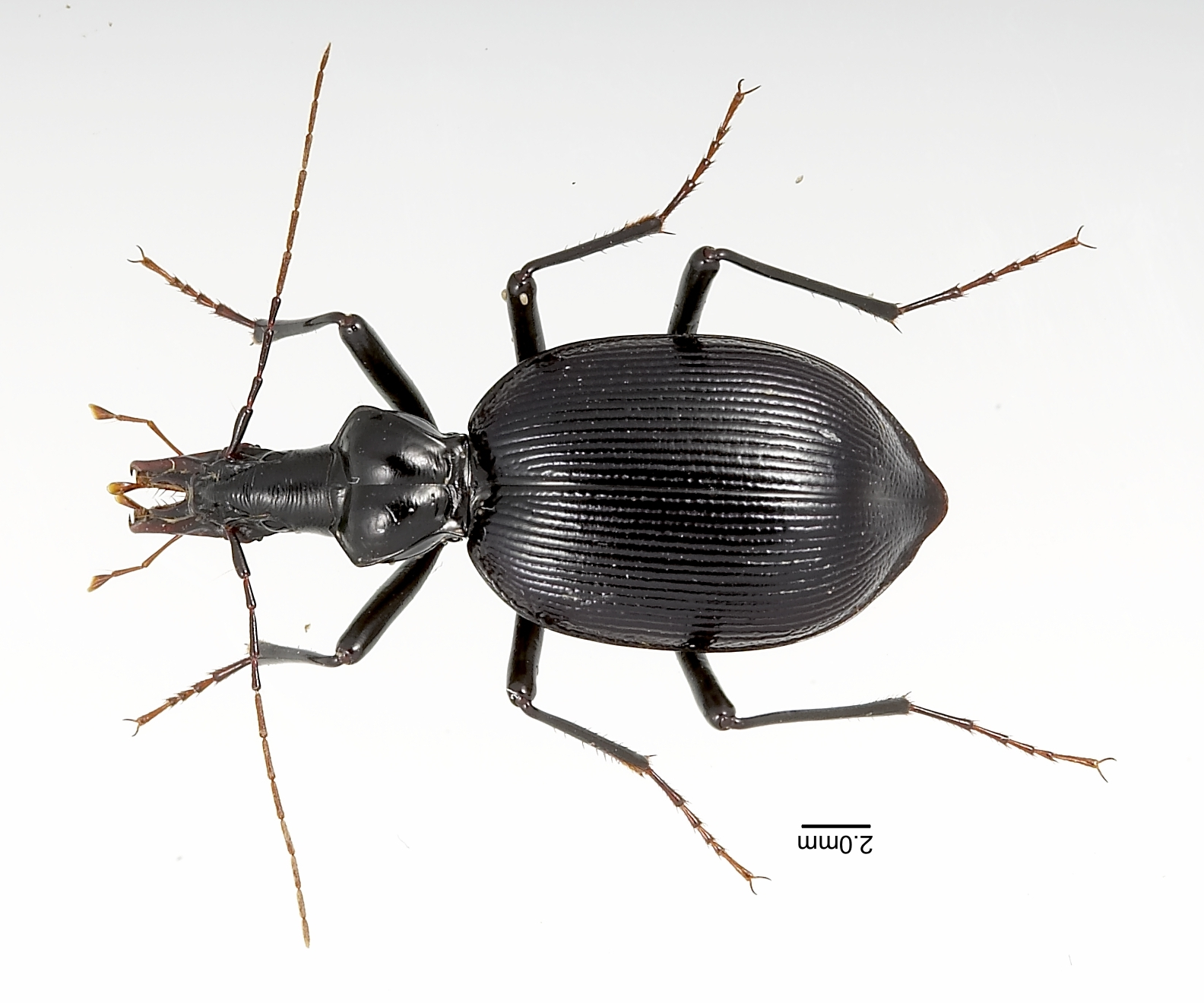
Scaphinotus longiceps

== Genera ==
These six genera belong to the tribe Cychrini:

- Cychropsis Boileau, 1901 - China and the Indian subcontinent
- Cychrus Fabricius, 1794 - Holarctic
- Maoripamborus Brookes, 1944 - New Zealand
- Pamborus Latreille, 1812 - Australia
- Scaphinotus Dejean, 1826 - North America
- Sphaeroderus Dejean, 1826 - North America
