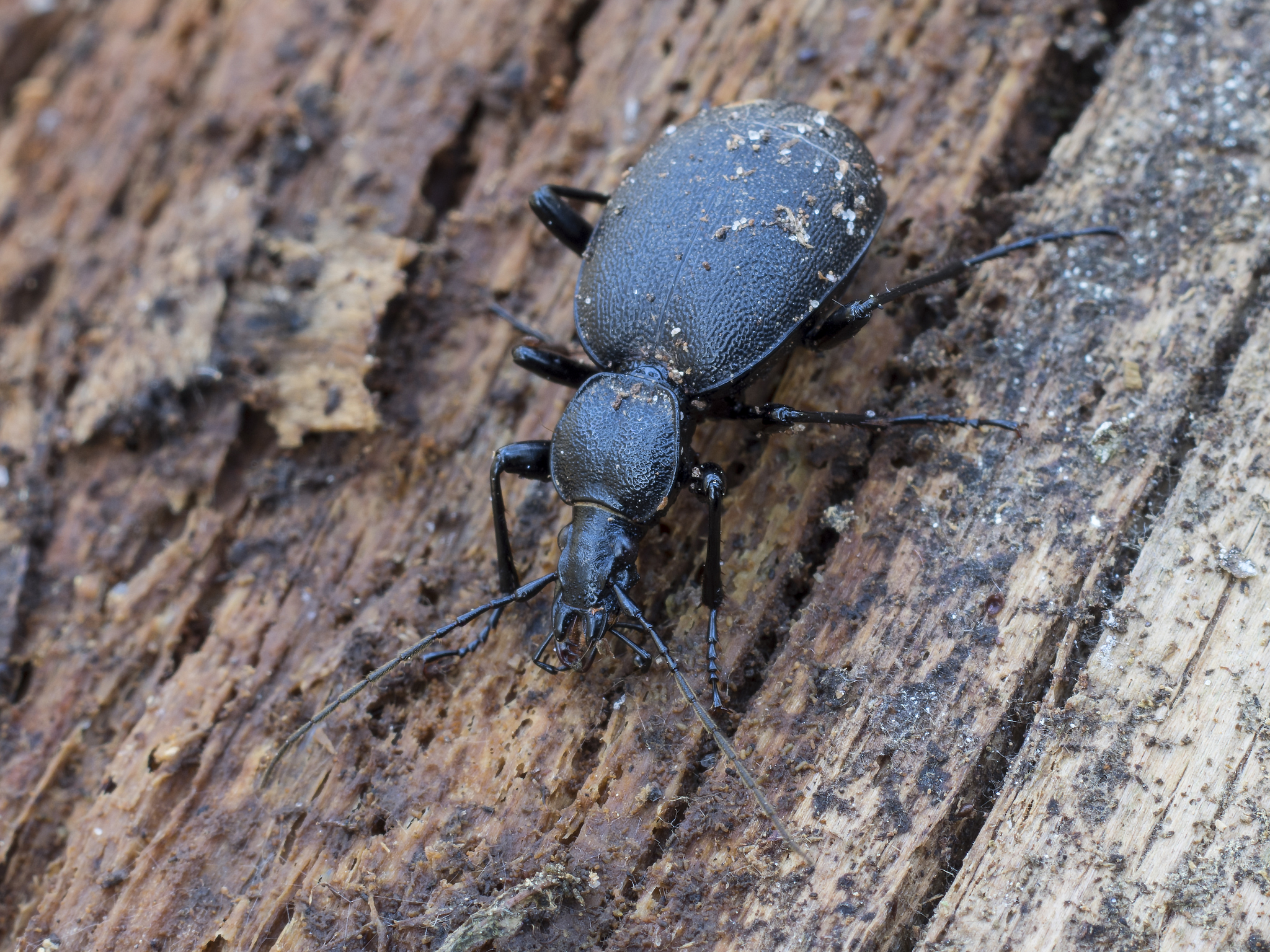
- Cychrus caraboides, snail hunter, Lithuania

Scientific classification
- Domain: Eukaryota
- Kingdom: Animalia
- Phylum: Arthropoda
- Class: Insecta
- Order: Coleoptera
- Suborder: Adephaga
- Family: Carabidae
- Tribe: Cychrini
- Genus: Cychrus; Fabricius, 1794

= Cychrus =

Genus of beetles

Cychrus is a large genus of rare snail-eating beetles in the family Carabidae. There are at least 160 described species in Cychrus. They are found throughout the world, although more than 80% of the species occur in China.

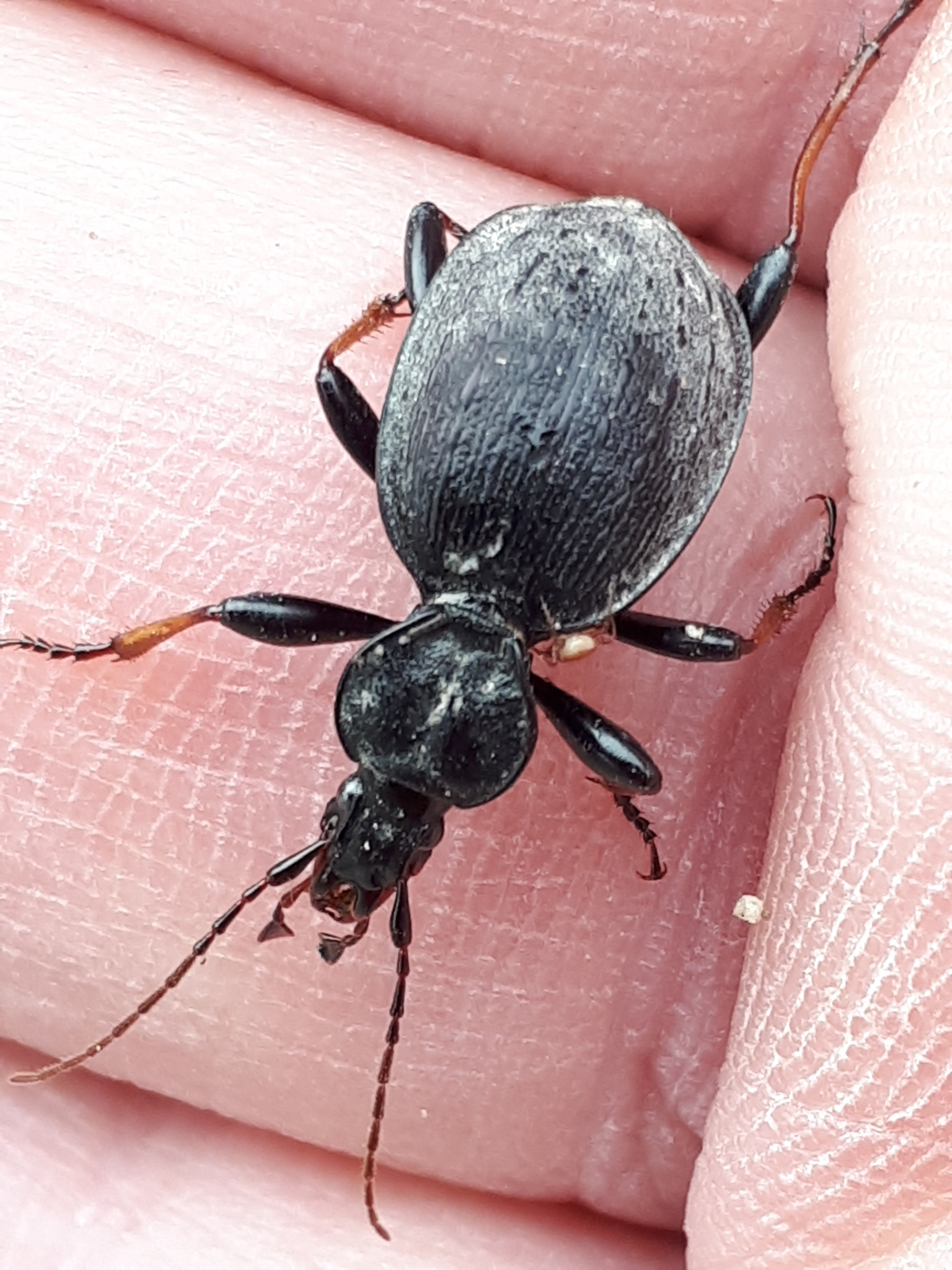
Cychrus attenuatus, Germany

== Cychrus species ==
These 160 species belong to the genus Cychrus.

- Cychrus aeneus Fischer von Waldheim, 1824 (Palearctic)
- Cychrus altitudinum Deuve, 1998 (China)
- Cychrus anatolicus Motschulsky, 1866 (Turkey)
- Cychrus angulicollis Sella, 1874 (France and Italy)
- Cychrus angustatus Hoppe & Hornschuch, 1825 (worldwide)
- Cychrus angustior Kleinfeld, 2000 (China)
- Cychrus angustitarsalis Deuve, 1991 (China)
- Cychrus anomalognathus Imura & Cavazzuti, 2018 (China)
- Cychrus attenuatus (Fabricius, 1792) (worldwide)
- Cychrus auvrayorum Deuve & Mourzine, 1997 (China)
- Cychrus barkamensis Deuve, 1991 (China)
- Cychrus baxiensis Deuve, 1997 (China)
- Cychrus becvari Deuve, 2018 (China)
- Cychrus benesi Deuve, 1996 (China)
- Cychrus bisetosus Deuve, 1995 (China)
- Cychrus bispinosus Deuve, 1989 (China)
- Cychrus boulbeni Deuve, 1997 (China)
- Cychrus bruggei Deuve, 1991 (China)
- Cychrus busatoi Cavazzuti, 2009 (China)
- Cychrus businskyianus Imura, 2000 (China)
- Cychrus businskyorum Imura, 2000 (China)
- Cychrus caraboides (Linnaeus, 1758) (snail hunter) (worldwide)
- Cychrus cavazzutii Deuve, 2002 (China)
- Cychrus cerberus Cavazzuti, 2007 (China)
- Cychrus chareti Deuve, 1993 (China)
- Cychrus colasi Deuve, 1994 (China)
- Cychrus coptolabroides Imura & Cavazzuti, 2017 (China)
- Cychrus cordicollis Chaudoir, 1835 (Europe)
- Cychrus cordithorax Deuve, 2007 (China)
- Cychrus cyaneomelas Deuve, 2010
- Cychrus cylindricollis Pini, 1871 (Italy)
- Cychrus dacatrai Deuve, 1992 (China)
- Cychrus daochengicus Deuve, 1989 (China)
- Cychrus davidis Fairmaire, 1886 (China)
- Cychrus deuveianus Cavazzuti, 1998 (China)
- Cychrus dolichognathus Deuve, 1990 (China)
- Cychrus dufouri Chaudoir, 1869 (France and Spain)
- Cychrus elongaticeps Deuve, 1992 (China)
- Cychrus elongatulus Deuve, 2001 (China)
- Cychrus evae Häckel & Sehnal, 2007 (China)
- Cychrus forceps Imura & Cavazzuti, 2017 (China)
- Cychrus fugongensis Imura & Cavazzuti, 2018 (China)
- Cychrus furumii Deuve, 1990 (China)
- Cychrus gorodinskiellus Deuve, 2016 (China)
- Cychrus gorodinskiorum Deuve, 2013 (China)
- Cychrus grajus K. & J.Daniel, 1898 (Italy)
- Cychrus grumulifer Deuve, 1994 (China)
- Cychrus haesitans Cavazzuti, 2007 (China)
- Cychrus hampei Gestro, 1875 (Bosnia-Herzegovina and Croatia)
- Cychrus heishuiensis Deuve, 2004 (China)
- Cychrus hemphillii G. Horn, 1879 (North America)
- Cychrus horribilis Deuve, 2016 (China)
- Cychrus huyaensis Imura & Cavazzuti, 2018 (China)
- Cychrus inexpectatior Deuve, 1991 (China)
- Cychrus inframontes Cavazzuti, 2007 (China)
- Cychrus inops Deuve, 1997 (China)
- Cychrus italicus Bonelli, 1810 (Europe)
- Cychrus janatai Deuve, 2001 (China)
- Cychrus jiaolieshanus Imura & Cavazzuti, 2019 (China)
- Cychrus jinchuanensis Deuve & Tian, 2007 (China)
- Cychrus jinpingshanus Imura & Cavazzuti, 2017 (China)
- Cychrus jirouxi Deuve, 2006 (China)
- Cychrus jiulongensis Deuve, 1994 (China)
- Cychrus kabakianus Imura & Cavazzuti, 2017 (China)
- Cychrus kalabi Deuve, 1991 (China)
- Cychrus kalabianus Deuve, 2019 (China)
- Cychrus kangensis Deuve & Tian, 2013 (China)
- Cychrus kaznakovi Semenov & Znojko, 1934 (China)
- Cychrus keithi Deuve, 1998 (China)
- Cychrus koiwayai Deuve & Imura, 1993 (China)
- Cychrus korotyaevi Deuve, 1991 (China)
- Cychrus kozlovi Semenov & Znojko, 1934 (China)
- Cychrus kralianus Deuve, 1996 (China)
- Cychrus kryzhanovskii Deuve, 2000 (China)
- Cychrus kubani Deuve, 1992 (China)
- Cychrus kvetoslavae Deuve, 2006 (China)
- Cychrus lajinensis Deuve & Tian, 2002 (China)
- Cychrus lanpingensis Deuve, 1997 (China)
- Cychrus lecordieri Deuve, 1990 (China)
- Cychrus lianghensis Cavazzuti, 2008 (China)
- Cychrus liei Kleinfeld, 2003 (China)
- Cychrus lilianae Cavazzuti, 1997 (China)
- Cychrus liuyei Deuve & Tian, 2013 (China)
- Cychrus loccai Cavazzuti, 1997 (China)
- Cychrus luctifer Deuve, 1991 (China)
- Cychrus ludmilae Imura, 1999 (China)
- Cychrus luhuo Deuve, 1994 (China)
- Cychrus luojiensis Cavazzuti, 1998 (China)
- Cychrus luolaluokuanus Imura & Cavazzuti, 2019 (China)
- Cychrus maoxianicus Deuve & Mourzine, 2000 (China)
- Cychrus marcilhaci Deuve, 1992 (China)
- Cychrus minjiangicus Deuve, 2009 (China)
- Cychrus minshanicola Deuve, 1987 (China)
- Cychrus miroslavi Deuve, 2006 (China)
- Cychrus moerkuaicus Deuve & Tian, 2007 (China)
- Cychrus morawitzi Géhin, 1885 (Asia)
- Cychrus morvani Deuve, 1998 (China)
- Cychrus motianling Imura & Cavazzuti, 2018 (China)
- Cychrus mugecuo Deuve, 1994 (China)
- Cychrus muliensis Deuve, 1992 (China)
- Cychrus naviauxi Deuve & Mourzine, 1998 (China)
- Cychrus nixiensis Imura & Cavazzuti, 2018 (China)
- Cychrus ombrophilus Deuve, 1990 (China)
- Cychrus pangi Deuve & Tian, 2004 (China)
- Cychrus paraxiei Cavazzuti, 2009 (China)
- Cychrus pentaploidus Deuve, 2010 (China)
- Cychrus pratti Breuning, 1946 (China)
- Cychrus procerus Cavazzuti, 1998 (China)
- Cychrus prosciai Cavazzuti, 2010 (China)
- Cychrus pseudokoiwayai Deuve, 1998 (China)
- Cychrus puchneri Kleinfeld, 2016 (China)
- Cychrus puetzi Kleinfeld & Korell&Wrase, 1996 (China)
- Cychrus quadrisetifer Imura, 1998 (China)
- Cychrus remondi Deuve, 1999 (China)
- Cychrus reni Deuve & Tian, 2013 (China)
- Cychrus reuteri Kleinfeld, 2018 (China)
- Cychrus riwaensis Deuve, 2006 (China)
- Cychrus rosti Roeschke, 1907 (Georgia and Russia)
- Cychrus rostislavi Deuve, 2009 (China)
- Cychrus rugicollis K. & J.Daniel, 1898 (Bosnia-Herzegovina)
- Cychrus rugocephalus Deuve, 2014 (China)
- Cychrus sabdensis Deuve, 1994 (China)
- Cychrus sars Imura & Häckel, 2003 (China)
- Cychrus schmidtii Chaudoir, 1837 (Europe)
- Cychrus schneideri Imura, 1997 (China)
- Cychrus sehnali Häckel, 2007 (China)
- Cychrus sellemi Deuve, 2002 (China)
- Cychrus semelai Deuve, 1997 (China)
- Cychrus semigranosus Palliardi, 1825 (worldwide)
- Cychrus seriatus Roeschke, 1907 (China)
- Cychrus shangrilanus Imura & Cavazzuti, 2017 (China)
- Cychrus shankoucola Deuve, 1994 (China)
- Cychrus shanxiensis Deuve, 2005 (China)
- Cychrus signatus Faldermann, 1836 (Georgia and Turkey)
- Cychrus sinicus Deuve, 1989 (China)
- Cychrus sola Cavazzuti, 1997 (China)
- Cychrus songpanensis Deuve, 1991 (China)
- Cychrus spinicollis L.Dufour, 1857 (Spain)
- Cychrus starcki Reitter, 1888 (Georgia and Russia)
- Cychrus stoetzneri Roeschke, 1923 (China)
- Cychrus szetshuanus Breuning, 1931 (China)
- Cychrus thibetanus Fairmaire, 1893 (China)
- Cychrus tubaemons Imura & Cavazzuti, 2017 (China)
- Cychrus tuberculatus T. Harris, 1839 (North America)
- Cychrus turnai Deuve, 1994 (China)
- Cychrus uenoi Imura, 1995 (China)
- Cychrus vignai Cavazzuti, 2011 (China)
- Cychrus wuyipeng Deuve, 1992 (China)
- Cychrus xiei Deuve, 1989 (China)
- Cychrus yadingensis Deuve, 2006 (China)
- Cychrus yajiangensis Deuve & Mourzine, 1998 (China)
- Cychrus yi Cavazzuti, 2001 (China)
- Cychrus yulongxuicus Deuve, 1991 (China)
- Cychrus yunnanus Fairmaire, 1887 (China)
- Cychrus zhimahensis Imura & Cavazzuti, 2019 (China)
- Cychrus zhoui Imura & Su&Osawa, 1998 (China)
- Cychrus zoigeicus Deuve, 1990 (China)
- Cychrus zuopengensis Imura & Cavazzuti, 2019 (China)
- † Cychrus minor G.Horn, 1876
- † Cychrus wheatleyi G.Horn, 1876
