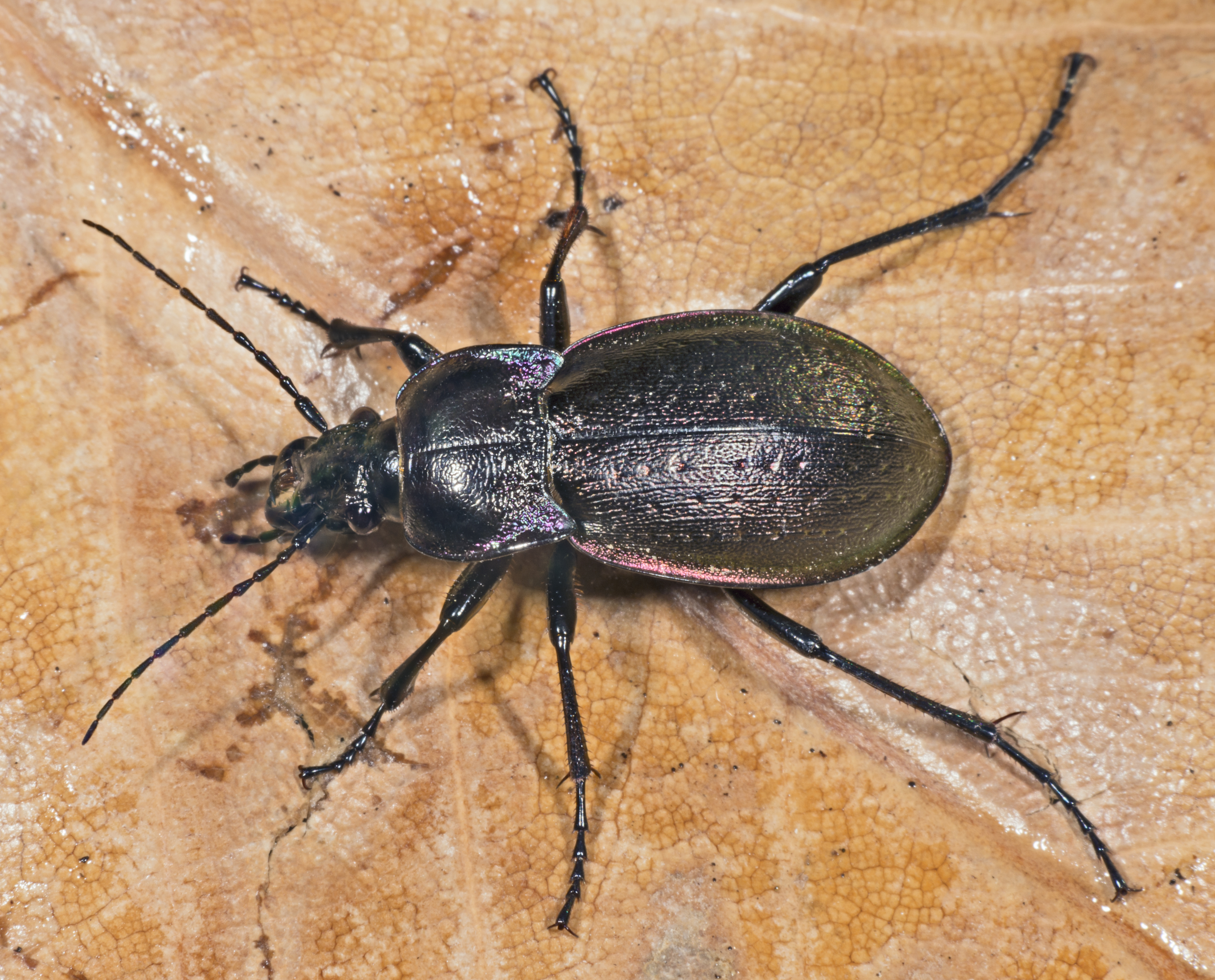
- Carabus nemoralis

Scientific classification
- Domain: Eukaryota
- Kingdom: Animalia
- Phylum: Arthropoda
- Class: Insecta
- Order: Coleoptera
- Suborder: Adephaga
- Family: Carabidae
- Subfamily: Carabinae; Linnaeus, 1802

Tribes
- Carabini Linnaeus, 1802; Cychrini Perty, 1834

= Carabinae =

Subfamily of beetles

Carabinae is a subfamily of ground beetles in the family Carabidae, containing ten genera and over fourteen hundred described species. It has two tribes, the Cychrini Laporte (1834) and Carabini Latreille (1802). The latter is divided into two subtribes, the Carabina Latreille (1802) and Ceroglossina Vacher de Lapouge (1927).

== Genera ==
These ten genera belong to the subfamily Carabinae:

Tribe Carabini Linnaeus, 1802
Genus Aplothorax G.R.Waterhouse, 1842
Genus Calosoma Weber, 1801
Genus Carabus Linnaeus, 1758
Genus Ceroglossus Solier, 1848
Tribe Cychrini Perty, 1830
Genus Cychropsis Boileau, 1901
Genus Cychrus Fabricius, 1794
Genus Scaphinotus Dejean, 1826
Genus Sphaeroderus Dejean, 1826
Genus Maoripamborus Brookes, 1944
Genus Pamborus Latreille, 1812
