= Cymatura spumans =

Scientific classification
- Kingdom: Animalia
- Phylum: Arthropoda
- Clade: Pancrustacea
- Class: Insecta
- Order: Coleoptera
- Suborder: Polyphaga
- Infraorder: Cucujiformia
- Family: Cerambycidae
- Genus: Cymatura
- Species: C. spumans

Binomial name
- Cymatura spumans (Guérin-Méneville, 1847)

Synonyms
- Cymatura lichenifera Fairmaire, 1894; Cymatura mashuna Péringuet, 1899; Cymatura scoparia Gerstäcker, 1855; Xylorhiza spumans Guérin-Méneville, 1847

Species of beetle

Cymatura spumans is a species of beetle in the family Cerambycidae. It was described by Félix Édouard Guérin-Méneville in 1847, originally under the genus Xylorhiza. It has a wide distribution in Africa.
