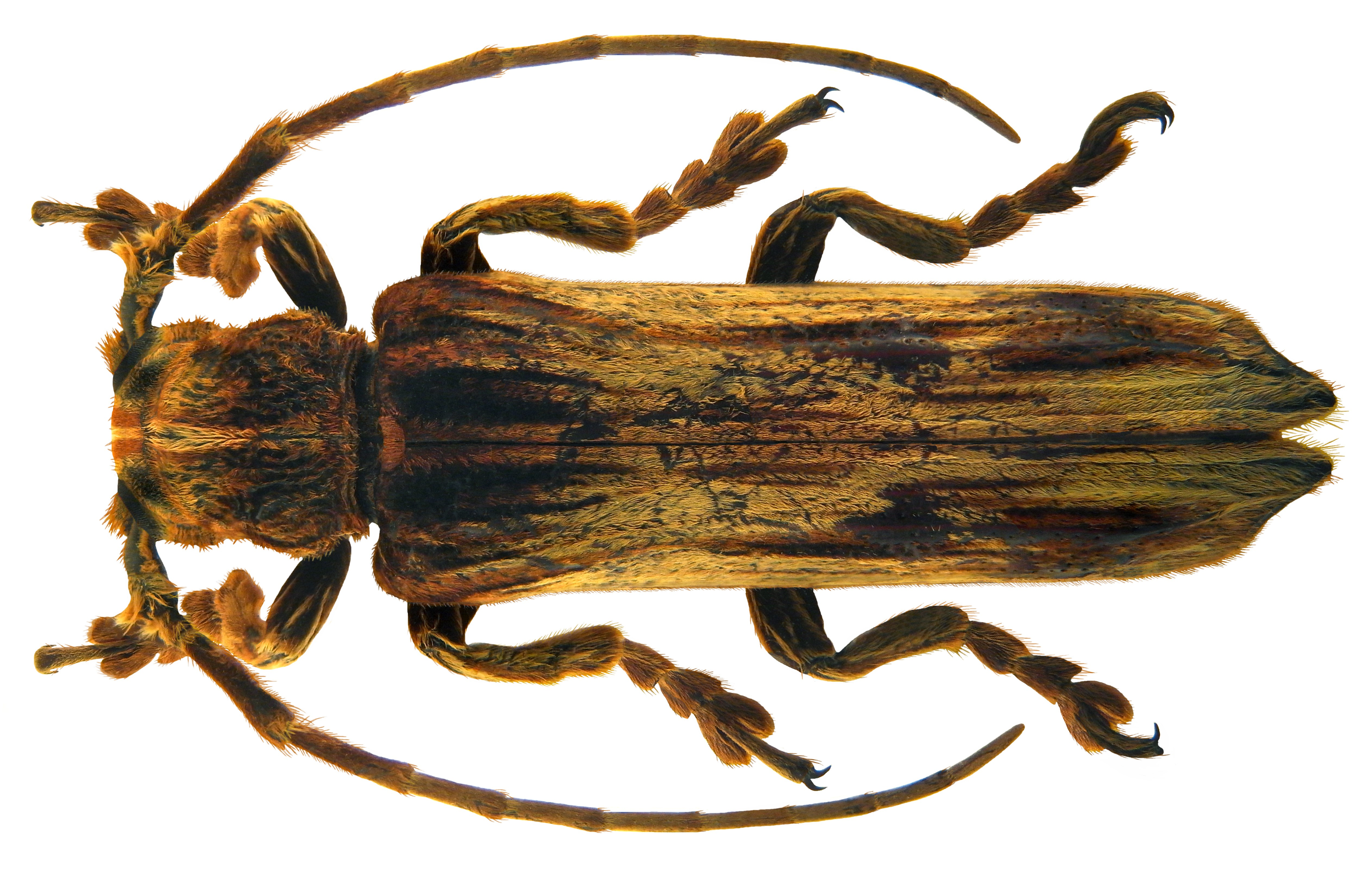
- Xylorhiza adusta

Scientific classification
- Domain: Eukaryota
- Kingdom: Animalia
- Phylum: Arthropoda
- Class: Insecta
- Order: Coleoptera
- Suborder: Polyphaga
- Infraorder: Cucujiformia
- Family: Cerambycidae
- Subfamily: Lamiinae
- Tribe: Xylorhizini; Lacordaire, 1872

= Xylorhizini =

Tribe of beetles

Xylorhizini is a tribe of longhorn beetles of the subfamily Lamiinae. It was described by Lacordaire in 1872.

== Taxonomy ==
- Aetholopus Pascoe, 1865
- Cymatura Gerstäcker, 1855
- Cyrtogrammus Gressitt, 1939
- Grammoxyla Aurivillius, 1911
- Monstropalpus Franz, 1954
- Parathylactus Breuning & de Jong, 1941
- Thylactus Pascoe, 1866
- Xylorhiza Dejean, 1835
