= Parathylactus dorsalis =

Scientific classification
- Kingdom: Animalia
- Phylum: Arthropoda
- Class: Insecta
- Order: Coleoptera
- Suborder: Polyphaga
- Infraorder: Cucujiformia
- Family: Cerambycidae
- Genus: Parathylactus
- Species: P. dorsalis

Binomial name
- Parathylactus dorsalis (Gahan, 1890)

Synonyms
- Thylactus dorsalis Gahan, 1890

Species of beetle

Parathylactus dorsalis is a species of beetle in the family Cerambycidae. It was described by Charles Joseph Gahan in 1890, originally under the genus Thylactus. It is known from Vietnam and Nepal.
