= Xylorhiza pilosipennis =

Scientific classification
- Kingdom: Animalia
- Phylum: Arthropoda
- Class: Insecta
- Order: Coleoptera
- Suborder: Polyphaga
- Infraorder: Cucujiformia
- Family: Cerambycidae
- Tribe: Xylorhizini
- Genus: Xylorhiza
- Species: X. pilosipennis

Binomial name
- Xylorhiza pilosipennis Breuning, 1943

Synonyms
- Xylorhiza erectepilosa Lingafelter, Garzón-Moreno & Nearns, 2013

Species of beetle

Xylorhiza pilosipennis is a species of beetle in the family Cerambycidae hailing from China. It was described by Stephan von Breuning in 1943.
