= Aetholopus thylactoides =

Scientific classification
- Kingdom: Animalia
- Phylum: Arthropoda
- Clade: Pancrustacea
- Class: Insecta
- Order: Coleoptera
- Suborder: Polyphaga
- Infraorder: Cucujiformia
- Family: Cerambycidae
- Genus: Aetholopus
- Species: A. thylactoides

Binomial name
- Aetholopus thylactoides Breuning, 1958

Species of beetle

Aetholopus thylactoides is a species of beetle in the family Cerambycidae. It was described by Stephan von Breuning in 1958. It is known from Java.
