= Cymatura brittoni =

Scientific classification
- Kingdom: Animalia
- Phylum: Arthropoda
- Class: Insecta
- Order: Coleoptera
- Suborder: Polyphaga
- Infraorder: Cucujiformia
- Family: Cerambycidae
- Genus: Cymatura
- Species: C. brittoni

Binomial name
- Cymatura brittoni Franz, 1954

Species of beetle

Cymatura brittoni is a species of beetle in the family Cerambycidae. It was described by Franz in 1954.
