= Cymatura nigra =

Scientific classification
- Kingdom: Animalia
- Phylum: Arthropoda
- Class: Insecta
- Order: Coleoptera
- Suborder: Polyphaga
- Infraorder: Cucujiformia
- Family: Cerambycidae
- Genus: Cymatura
- Species: C. nigra

Binomial name
- Cymatura nigra Franz, 1954

Species of beetle

Cymatura nigra is a species of beetle in the family Cerambycidae. It was described by Franz in 1954. It is known from Tanzania, the Democratic Republic of the Congo, Burundi, and Uganda.
