= Cymatura mabokensis =

Scientific classification
- Kingdom: Animalia
- Phylum: Arthropoda
- Class: Insecta
- Order: Coleoptera
- Suborder: Polyphaga
- Infraorder: Cucujiformia
- Family: Cerambycidae
- Genus: Cymatura
- Species: C. mabokensis

Binomial name
- Cymatura mabokensis Breuning & Teocchi, 1973

Species of beetle

Cymatura mabokensis is a species of beetle in the family Cerambycidae. It was described by Stephan von Breuning and Pierre Téocchi in 1973. It is known from the Central African Republic.
