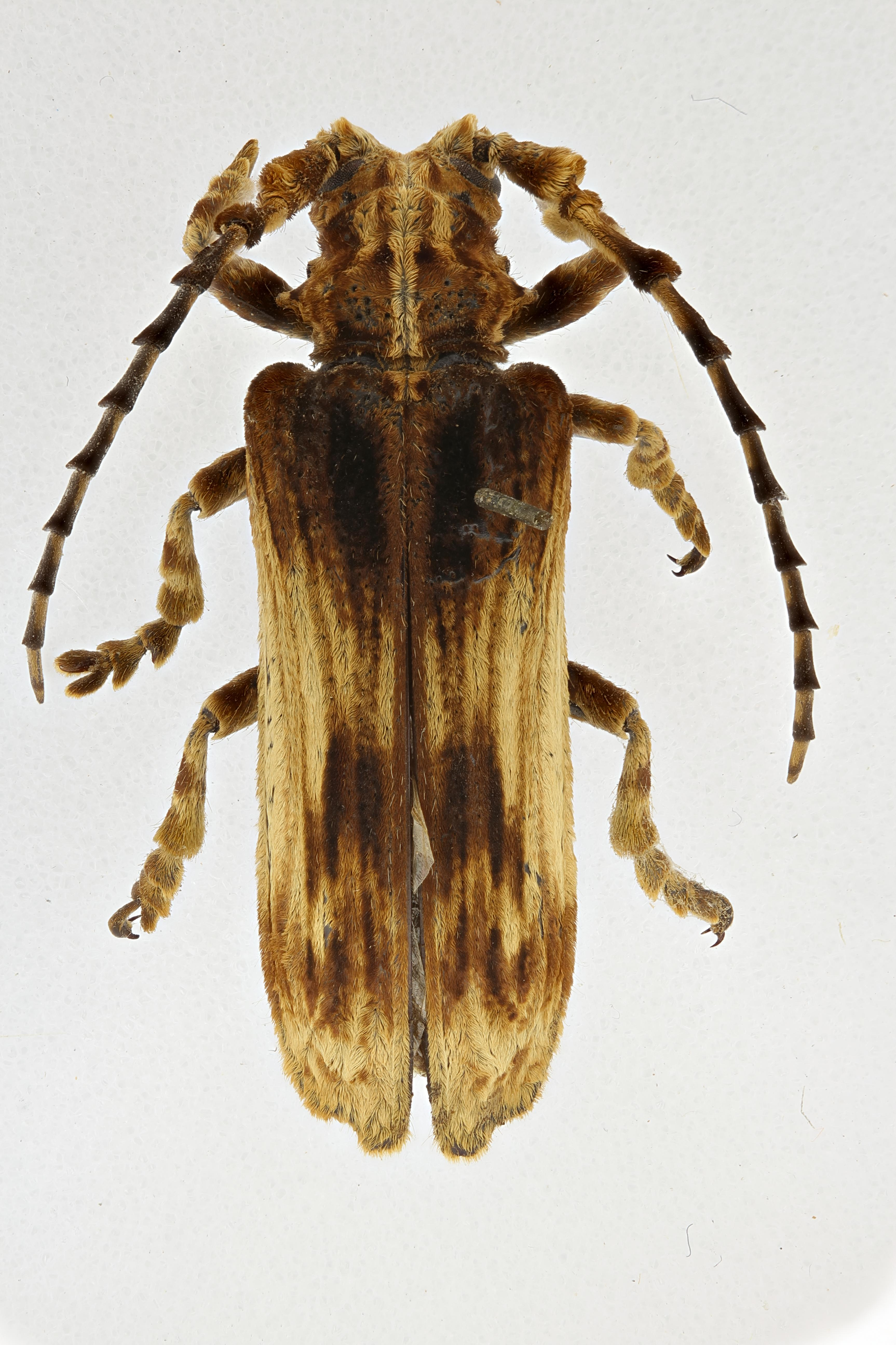

Scientific classification
- Domain: Eukaryota
- Kingdom: Animalia
- Phylum: Arthropoda
- Class: Insecta
- Order: Coleoptera
- Suborder: Polyphaga
- Infraorder: Cucujiformia
- Family: Cerambycidae
- Genus: Thylactus
- Species: T. simulans

Binomial name
- Thylactus simulans Gahan, 1890

= Thylactus simulans =

Species of beetle

Thylactus simulans is a species of beetle in the family Cerambycidae. It was described by Charles Joseph Gahan in 1890. It is known from Myanmar, India, Vietnam, and Thailand.
