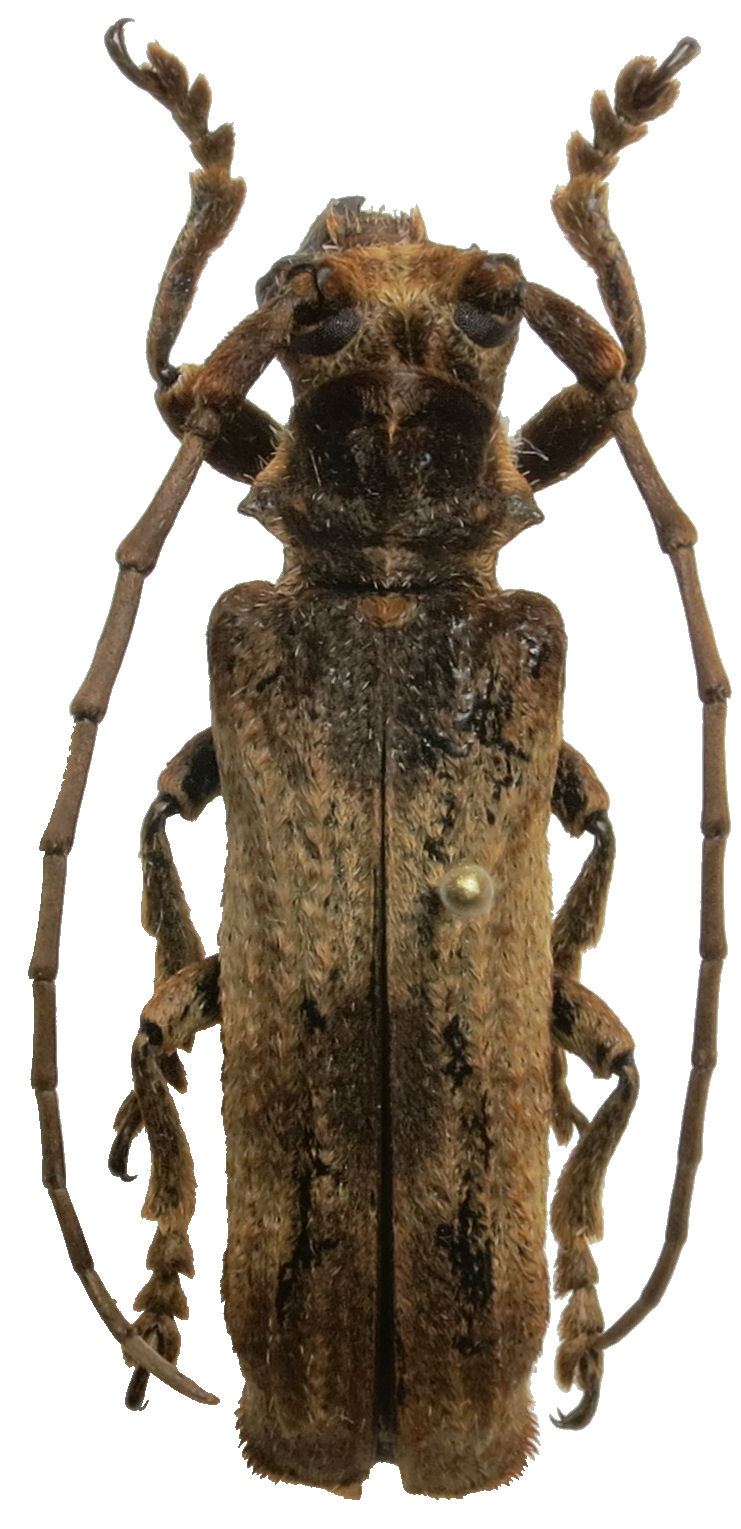
- Thylactus zuberhoferi from Togo

Scientific classification
- Domain: Eukaryota
- Kingdom: Animalia
- Phylum: Arthropoda
- Class: Insecta
- Order: Coleoptera
- Suborder: Polyphaga
- Infraorder: Cucujiformia
- Family: Cerambycidae
- Genus: Thylactus
- Species: T. zuberhoferi

Binomial name
- Thylactus zuberhoferi (Thomson, 1878)

Synonyms
- Thylactus nubilus Kolbe, 1894; Thylactus longipennis Pascoe, 1886; Cymatura zuberhoferi Thomson, 1878

= Thylactus zuberhoferi =

Species of beetle

Thylactus zuberhoferi is a species of beetle in the family Cerambycidae. It was described by James Thomson in 1878. It is known from the Ivory Coast, the Central African Republic, Cameroon, and Togo.
