= Cymatura orientalis =

Scientific classification
- Kingdom: Animalia
- Phylum: Arthropoda
- Class: Insecta
- Order: Coleoptera
- Suborder: Polyphaga
- Infraorder: Cucujiformia
- Family: Cerambycidae
- Genus: Cymatura
- Species: C. orientalis

Binomial name
- Cymatura orientalis (Breuning, 1968)

Synonyms
- Thylactus orientalis Breuning, 1968

Species of beetle

Cymatura orientalis is a species of beetle in the family Cerambycidae. It was described by Stephan von Breuning in 1968. It is known from Tanzania.
