= Thylactus dentipennis =

Scientific classification
- Domain: Eukaryota
- Kingdom: Animalia
- Phylum: Arthropoda
- Class: Insecta
- Order: Coleoptera
- Suborder: Polyphaga
- Infraorder: Cucujiformia
- Family: Cerambycidae
- Genus: Thylactus
- Species: T. dentipennis

Binomial name
- Thylactus dentipennis Wang & Jiang, 1998

Species of beetle

Thylactus dentipennis is a species of beetle in the family Cerambycidae. It was described by Wang and Jiang in 1998.
