= Thylactus kinduensis =

Scientific classification
- Kingdom: Animalia
- Phylum: Arthropoda
- Class: Insecta
- Order: Coleoptera
- Suborder: Polyphaga
- Infraorder: Cucujiformia
- Family: Cerambycidae
- Genus: Thylactus
- Species: T. kinduensis

Binomial name
- Thylactus kinduensis Breuning, 1950

Species of beetle

Thylactus kinduensis is a species of beetle in the family Cerambycidae. It was described by Stephan von Breuning in 1950.

== Subspecies ==
- Thylactus kinduensis kinduensis Breuning, 1950
- Thylactus kinduensis ferreroi Teocchi, 1989
