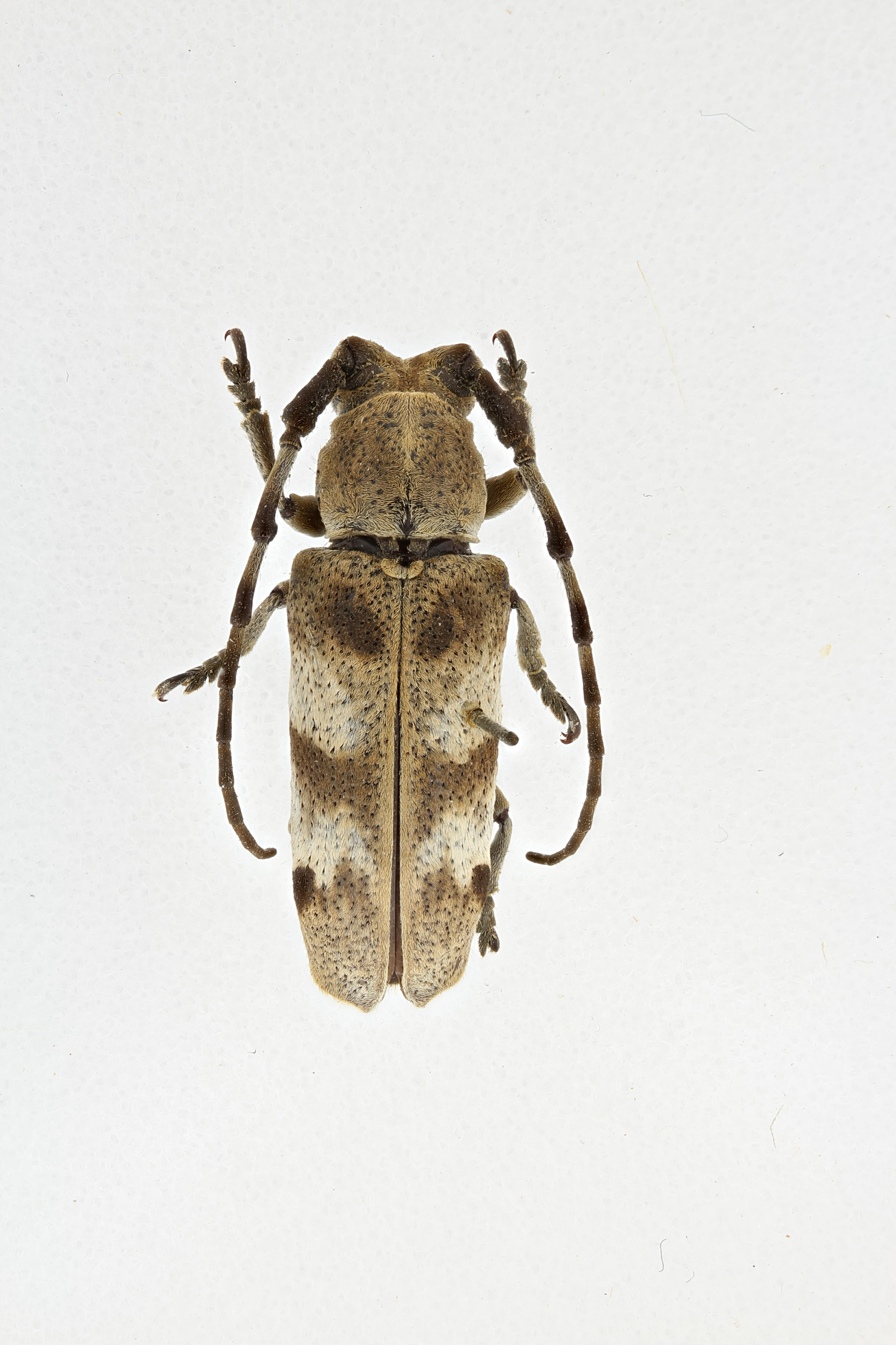

Scientific classification
- Kingdom: Animalia
- Phylum: Arthropoda
- Class: Insecta
- Order: Coleoptera
- Suborder: Polyphaga
- Infraorder: Cucujiformia
- Family: Cerambycidae
- Genus: Aetholopus
- Species: A. scalaris

Binomial name
- Aetholopus scalaris Pascoe, 1865

= Aetholopus scalaris =

Species of beetle

Aetholopus scalaris is a species of beetle in the family Cerambycidae. It was described by Francis Polkinghorne Pascoe in 1865. It is known from the Philippines and Moluccas.
