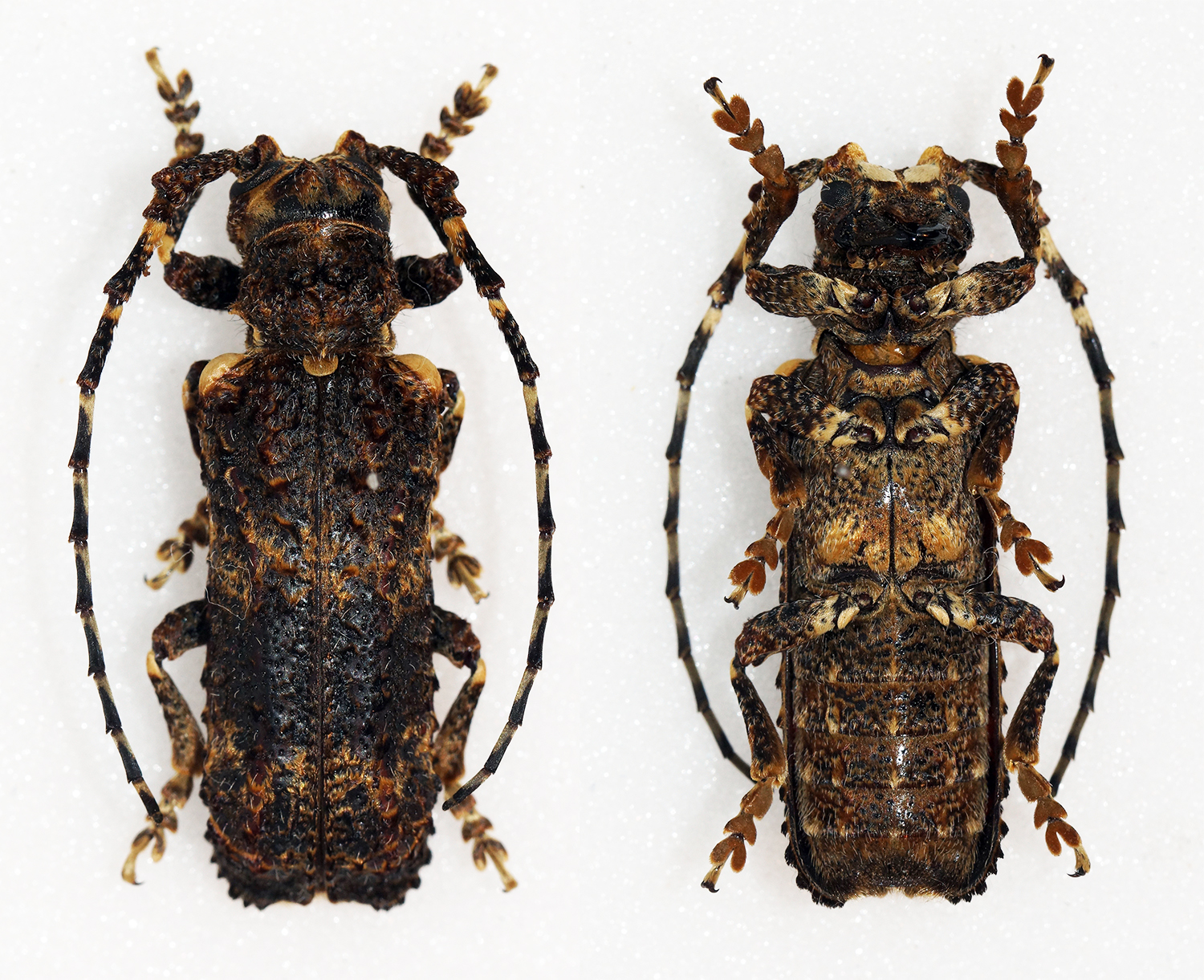

Scientific classification
- Kingdom: Animalia
- Phylum: Arthropoda
- Class: Insecta
- Order: Coleoptera
- Suborder: Polyphaga
- Infraorder: Cucujiformia
- Family: Cerambycidae
- Genus: Cymatura
- Species: C. albomaculata

Binomial name
- Cymatura albomaculata Breuning, 1950

Synonyms
- Cymatura spumans m. albomaculata Breuning, 1950; Cymatura spumans m. intermedia Teocchi, 1992

= Cymatura albomaculata =

Species of beetle

Cymatura albomaculata is a species of beetle in the family Cerambycidae. It was described by Stephan von Breuning in 1950. It is known from Tanzania, the Democratic Republic of the Congo, Zambia, South Africa, Zimbabwe, and possibly Malawi.
