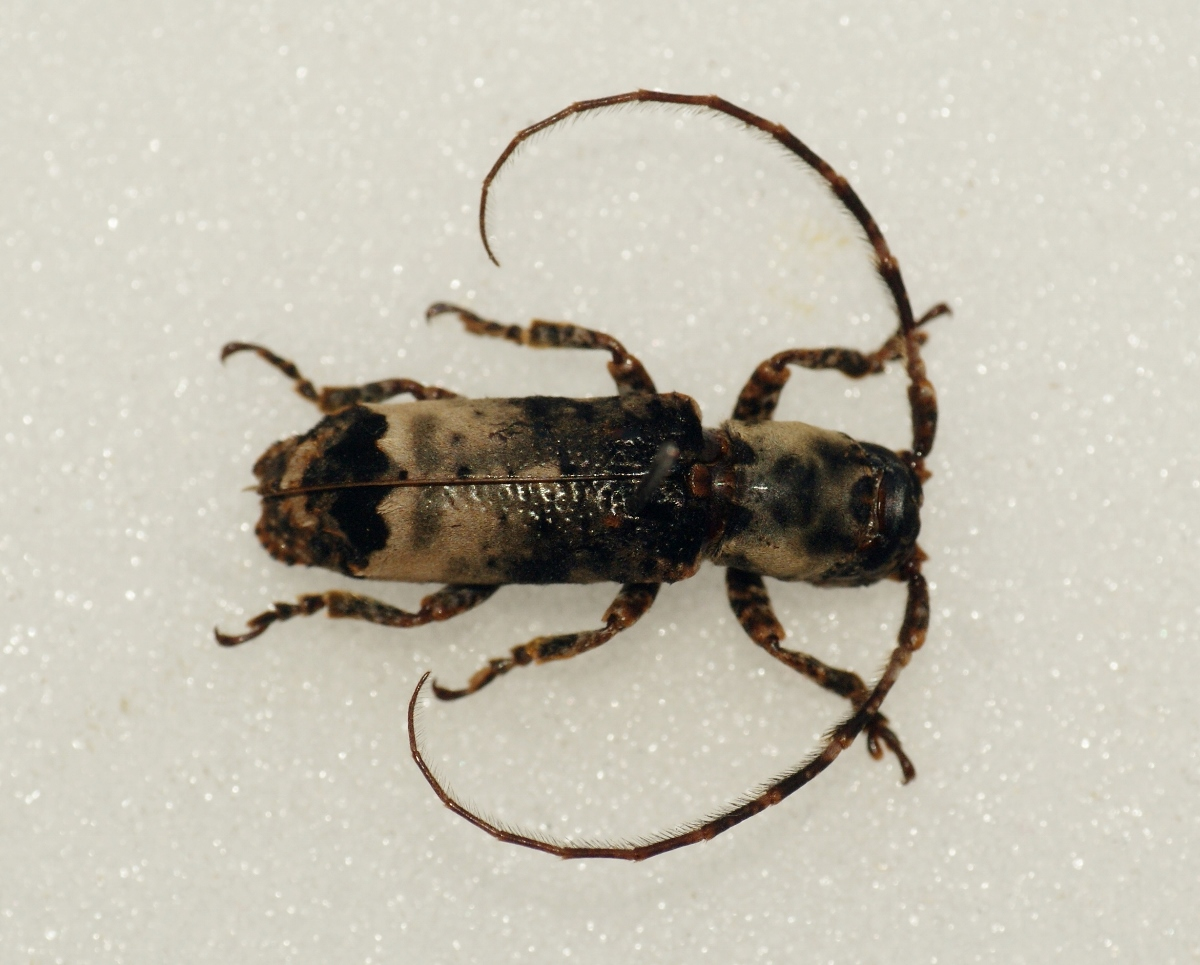
- Cymatura fasciata

Scientific classification
- Kingdom: Animalia
- Phylum: Arthropoda
- Class: Insecta
- Order: Coleoptera
- Suborder: Polyphaga
- Infraorder: Cucujiformia
- Family: Cerambycidae
- Subfamily: Lamiinae
- Tribe: Xylorhizini
- Genus: Cymatura; Gerstaecker, 1855

= Cymatura =

Genus of beetles

Cymatura is a genus of longhorn beetles of the subfamily Lamiinae, containing the following species:

- Cymatura albomaculata Breuning, 1950
- Cymatura bifasciata Gerstäcker, 1855
- Cymatura bizonata Quedenfeldt, 1881
- Cymatura brittoni Franz, 1954
- Cymatura fasciata (Guérin-Meneville, 1849)
- Cymatura holonigra Breuning, 1954
- Cymatura itzingeri Breuning, 1935
- Cymatura mabokensis Breuning & Teocchi, 1973
- Cymatura manowi Franz, 1954
- Cymatura mechowi Quednfeldt, 1882
- Cymatura mucorea Fairmaire, 1887
- Cymatura nigra Franz, 1954
- Cymatura nyassica Breuning, 1935
- Cymatura orientalis (Breuning, 1968)
- Cymatura spumans (Guérin-Meneville, 1847)
- Cymatura strandi Breuning, 1935
- Cymatura tarsalis Aurivillius, 1914
- Cymatura wallabergeri Adlbauer, 1994
