= Thylactus analis =

Scientific classification
- Domain: Eukaryota
- Kingdom: Animalia
- Phylum: Arthropoda
- Class: Insecta
- Order: Coleoptera
- Suborder: Polyphaga
- Infraorder: Cucujiformia
- Family: Cerambycidae
- Genus: Thylactus
- Species: T. analis

Binomial name
- Thylactus analis Franz, 1954

Species of beetle

Thylactus analis is a species of beetle in the family Cerambycidae. It was described by Franz in 1954. It is known from China.
