= Thylactus pulawskii =

Scientific classification
- Domain: Eukaryota
- Kingdom: Animalia
- Phylum: Arthropoda
- Class: Insecta
- Order: Coleoptera
- Suborder: Polyphaga
- Infraorder: Cucujiformia
- Family: Cerambycidae
- Genus: Thylactus
- Species: T. pulawskii

Binomial name
- Thylactus pulawskii Hua, 1986

Species of beetle

Thylactus pulawskii is a species of beetle in the family Cerambycidae. It was described by Hua in 1986.
