= Cymatura manowi =

Scientific classification
- Kingdom: Animalia
- Phylum: Arthropoda
- Class: Insecta
- Order: Coleoptera
- Suborder: Polyphaga
- Infraorder: Cucujiformia
- Family: Cerambycidae
- Genus: Cymatura
- Species: C. manowi

Binomial name
- Cymatura manowi Franz, 1954

Synonyms
- Cymatura bifasciata ulugurensis Breuning, 1968

Species of beetle

Cymatura manowi is a species of beetle in the family Cerambycidae. It was described by Franz in 1954. It is known from Mozambique, Kenya, Malawi, Tanzania, South Africa, and possibly Somalia and Uganda.
