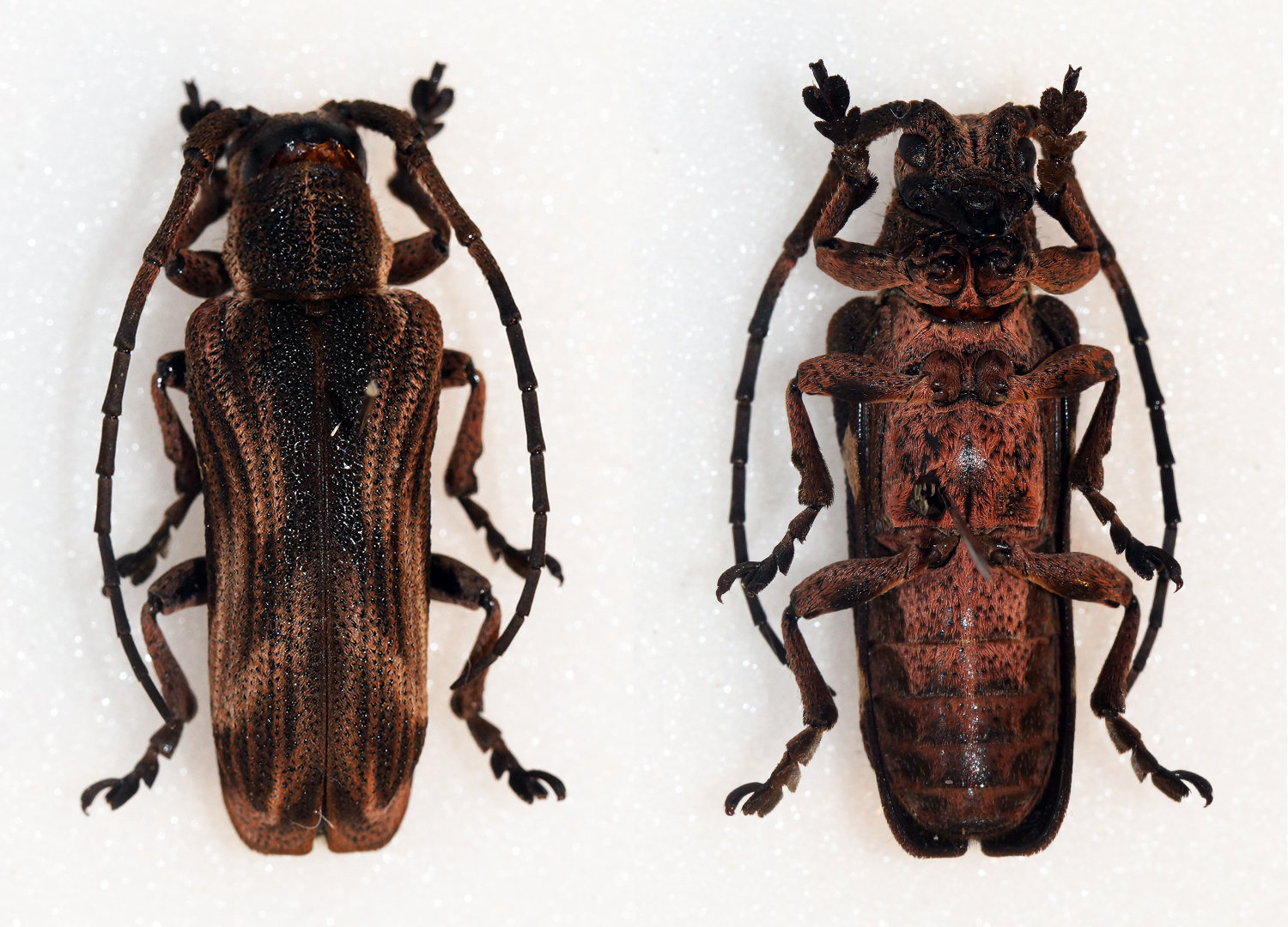

Scientific classification
- Kingdom: Animalia
- Phylum: Arthropoda
- Class: Insecta
- Order: Coleoptera
- Suborder: Polyphaga
- Infraorder: Cucujiformia
- Family: Cerambycidae
- Genus: Cyrtogrammus
- Species: C. laosicus

Binomial name
- Cyrtogrammus laosicus Breuning, 1968

= Cyrtogrammus laosicus =

Species of beetle

Cyrtogrammus laosicus is a species of beetle in the family Cerambycidae. It was described by Stephan von Breuning in 1968. It is known from Laos.
