= Cymatura bifasciata =

Scientific classification
- Kingdom: Animalia
- Phylum: Arthropoda
- Class: Insecta
- Order: Coleoptera
- Suborder: Polyphaga
- Infraorder: Cucujiformia
- Family: Cerambycidae
- Genus: Cymatura
- Species: C. bifasciata

Binomial name
- Cymatura bifasciata Gerstaecker, 1855

Synonyms
- Cymatura obliquefasciata Breuning, 1937

Species of beetle

Cymatura bifasciata is a species of beetle in the family Cerambycidae. It was described by Carl Eduard Adolph Gerstaecker in 1855. It is known from South Africa, Mozambique, Zambia, the Democratic Republic of the Congo, Eswatini, Malawi, and Zimbabwe. It feeds on Acacia decurrens.

== Subspecies ==
- Cymatura bifasciata bifasciata Gerstaecker, 1855
- Cymatura bifasciata reducta Breuning, 1950
