= Cymatura tarsalis =

Scientific classification
- Kingdom: Animalia
- Phylum: Arthropoda
- Class: Insecta
- Order: Coleoptera
- Suborder: Polyphaga
- Infraorder: Cucujiformia
- Family: Cerambycidae
- Genus: Cymatura
- Species: C. tarsalis

Binomial name
- Cymatura tarsalis Aurivillius, 1914

Species of beetle

Cymatura tarsalis is a species of beetle in the family Cerambycidae. It was described by Per Olof Christopher Aurivillius in 1914. It is known from Kenya, Uganda, and the Democratic Republic of the Congo. It feeds on Terminalia velutina and Parinari excelsa.
