= Cymatura mucorea =

Scientific classification
- Kingdom: Animalia
- Phylum: Arthropoda
- Class: Insecta
- Order: Coleoptera
- Suborder: Polyphaga
- Infraorder: Cucujiformia
- Family: Cerambycidae
- Genus: Cymatura
- Species: C. mucorea

Binomial name
- Cymatura mucorea Fairmaire, 1887

Synonyms
- Cymatura fasciata m. mucorea (Fairmaire) Breuning, 1950

Species of beetle

Cymatura mucorea is a species of beetle in the family Cerambycidae. It was described by Léon Fairmaire in 1887. It is known from Tanzania, Kenya, the Democratic Republic of the Congo, Somalia, and Ethiopia.
