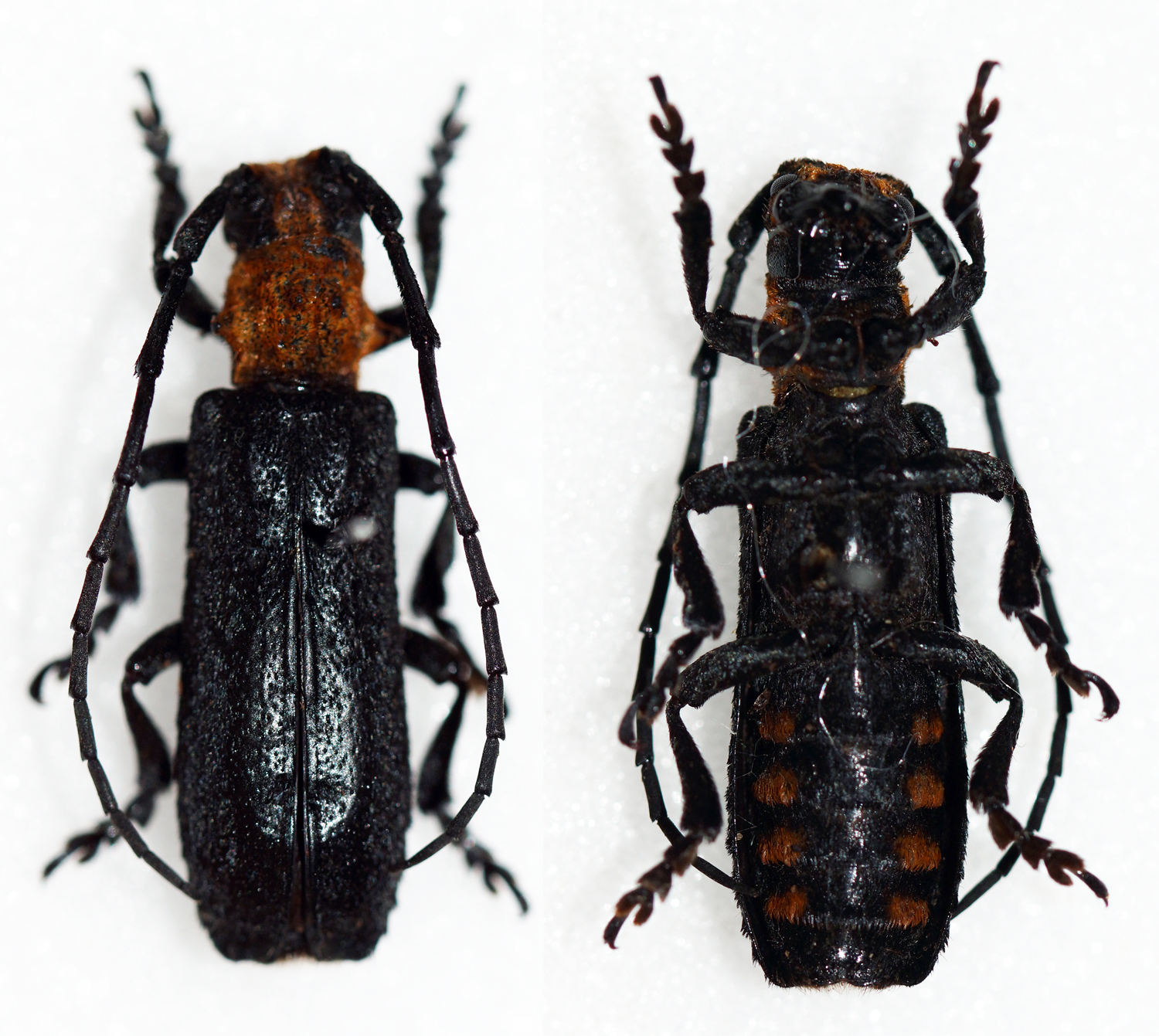

Scientific classification
- Kingdom: Animalia
- Phylum: Arthropoda
- Class: Insecta
- Order: Coleoptera
- Suborder: Polyphaga
- Infraorder: Cucujiformia
- Family: Cerambycidae
- Genus: Cymatura
- Species: C. mechowi

Binomial name
- Cymatura mechowi Quednfeldt, 1882

Synonyms
- Cymatura bifasciata var. nigripennis Gahan, 1894; Cymatura fasciata var. uniformis Breuning, 1950

= Cymatura mechowi =

Species of beetle

Cymatura mechowi is a species of beetle in the family Cerambycidae. It was described by Quednfeldt in 1882. It is known from Tanzania, Malawi, Angola, and Mozambique.
