= Thylactus densepunctatus =

Scientific classification
- Domain: Eukaryota
- Kingdom: Animalia
- Phylum: Arthropoda
- Class: Insecta
- Order: Coleoptera
- Suborder: Polyphaga
- Infraorder: Cucujiformia
- Family: Cerambycidae
- Genus: Thylactus
- Species: T. densepunctatus

Binomial name
- Thylactus densepunctatus Chiang & Li, 1984

Species of beetle

Thylactus densepunctatus is a species of beetle in the family Cerambycidae. It was described by Chiang and Li in 1984. It is known from China.
