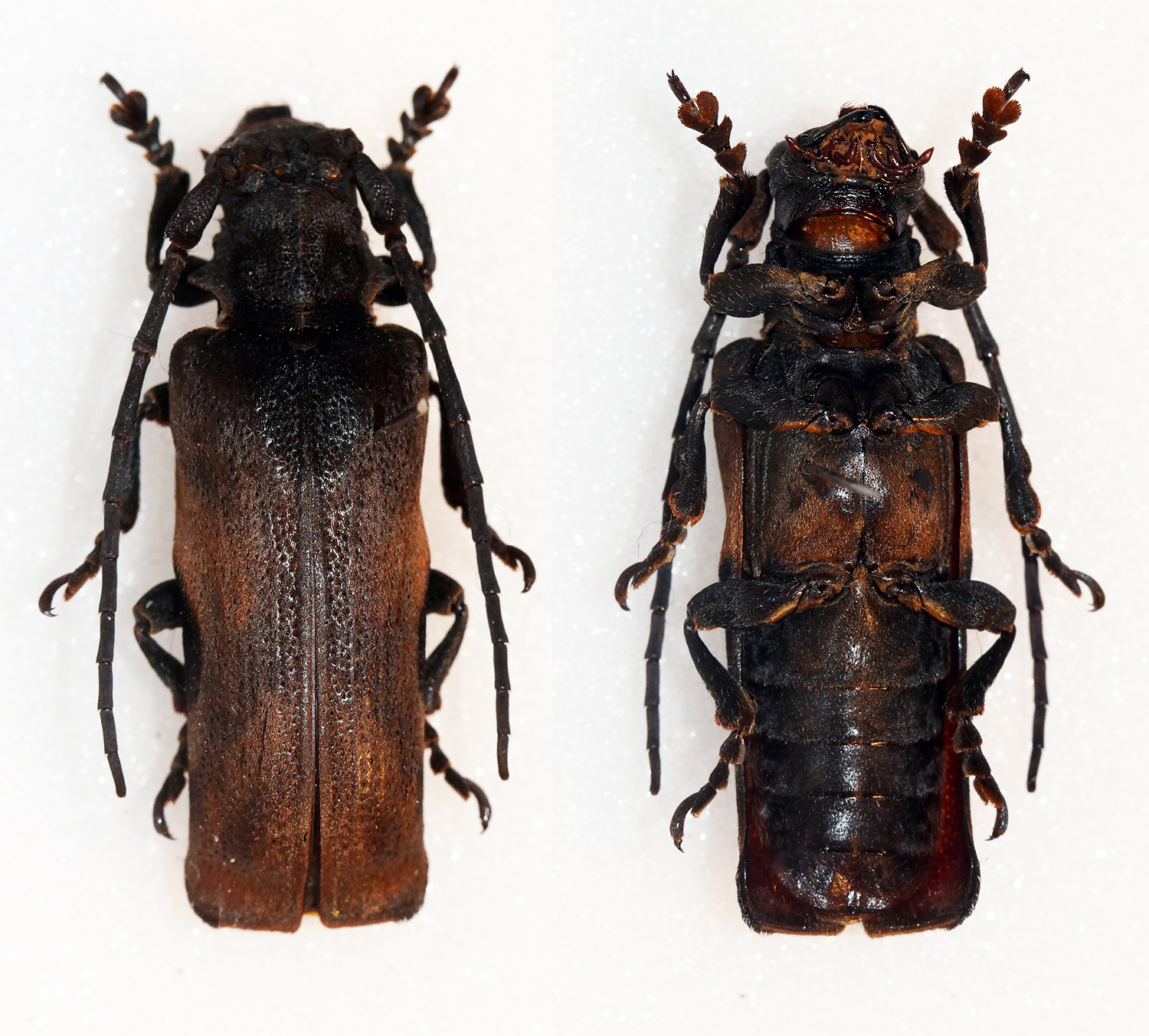
- Thylactus angularis (male)

Scientific classification
- Domain: Eukaryota
- Kingdom: Animalia
- Phylum: Arthropoda
- Class: Insecta
- Order: Coleoptera
- Suborder: Polyphaga
- Infraorder: Cucujiformia
- Family: Cerambycidae
- Genus: Thylactus
- Species: T. angularis

Binomial name
- Thylactus angularis Pascoe, 1866

= Thylactus angularis =

Species of beetle

Thylactus angularis is a species of beetle in the family of longhorned beetles known as Cerambycidae. It was described by Francis Polkinghorne Pascoe in 1866. It is known from Sumatra and Malaysia.
