= Thylactus chinensis =

Scientific classification
- Domain: Eukaryota
- Kingdom: Animalia
- Phylum: Arthropoda
- Class: Insecta
- Order: Coleoptera
- Suborder: Polyphaga
- Infraorder: Cucujiformia
- Family: Cerambycidae
- Genus: Thylactus
- Species: T. chinensis

Binomial name
- Thylactus chinensis Kriesche, 1924

Synonyms
- Thylactus angustatus Pic, 1925

Species of beetle

Thylactus chinensis is a species of beetle in the family Cerambycidae. It was described by Kriesche in 1924. It is known from Vietnam, China and Taiwan.
