= Parathylactus sumatranus =

Scientific classification
- Kingdom: Animalia
- Phylum: Arthropoda
- Class: Insecta
- Order: Coleoptera
- Suborder: Polyphaga
- Infraorder: Cucujiformia
- Family: Cerambycidae
- Genus: Parathylactus
- Species: P. sumatranus

Binomial name
- Parathylactus sumatranus Breuning & de Jong, 1941

Species of beetle

Parathylactus sumatranus is a species of beetle in the family Cerambycidae. It was described by Stephan von Breuning and de Jong in 1941. It is known from Sumatra.
