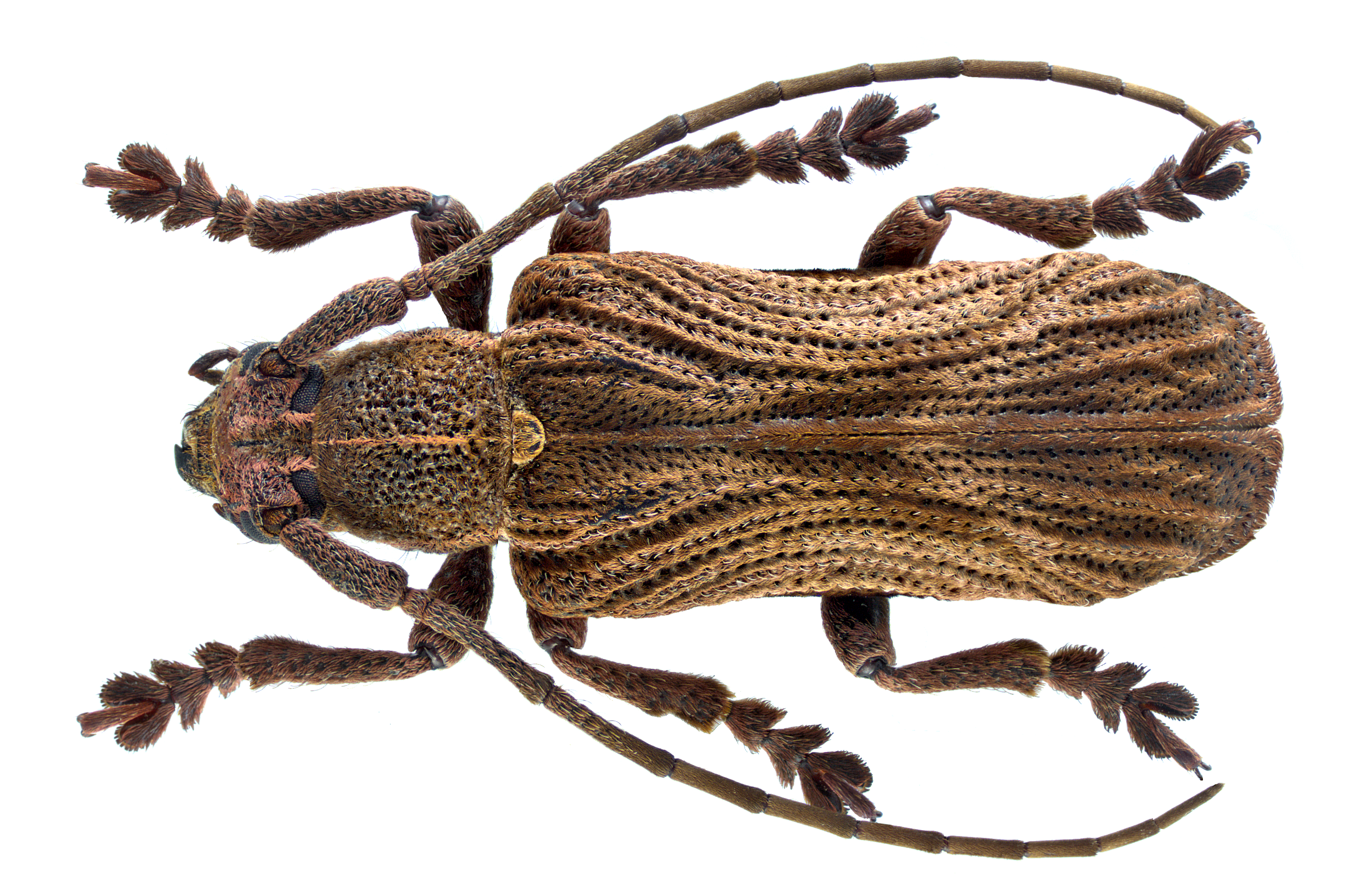
- Cryptogrammus

Scientific classification
- Kingdom: Animalia
- Phylum: Arthropoda
- Class: Insecta
- Order: Coleoptera
- Suborder: Polyphaga
- Infraorder: Cucujiformia
- Family: Cerambycidae
- Tribe: Xylorhizini
- Genus: Cyrtogrammus

= Cyrtogrammus =

Genus of beetles

Cyrtogrammus is a genus of longhorn beetles of the subfamily Lamiinae, containing the following species:

- Cyrtogrammus laosicus Breuning, 1968
- Cyrtogrammus lateripictus Gressitt, 1939
- Cyrtogrammus sumatranus Franz, 1954
