= Cymatura bizonata =

Scientific classification
- Kingdom: Animalia
- Phylum: Arthropoda
- Class: Insecta
- Order: Coleoptera
- Suborder: Polyphaga
- Infraorder: Cucujiformia
- Family: Cerambycidae
- Genus: Cymatura
- Species: C. bizonata

Binomial name
- Cymatura bizonata Quedenfeldt, 1881

Synonyms
- Cymatura bizonata m. conjuncta Breuning, 1970 nec Gilmour, 1954

Species of beetle

Cymatura bizonata is a species of beetle in the family Cerambycidae. It was described by Quedenfeldt in 1881. It is known from the Republic of the Congo, Tanzania, Angola, the Democratic Republic of the Congo, and Equatorial Guinea. It feeds on Acacia decurrens.
