= Thylactus sumatrensis =

Scientific classification
- Kingdom: Animalia
- Phylum: Arthropoda
- Clade: Pancrustacea
- Class: Insecta
- Order: Coleoptera
- Suborder: Polyphaga
- Infraorder: Cucujiformia
- Family: Cerambycidae
- Genus: Thylactus
- Species: T. sumatrensis

Binomial name
- Thylactus sumatrensis Hüdepohl, 1987

Synonyms
- Grammoxyla sumatrensis (Hüdepohl, 1987)

Species of beetle

Thylactus sumatrensis is a species of beetle in the family Cerambycidae. It was described by Karl-Ernst Hüdepohl in 1987. It is known from Sumatra and Borneo.
