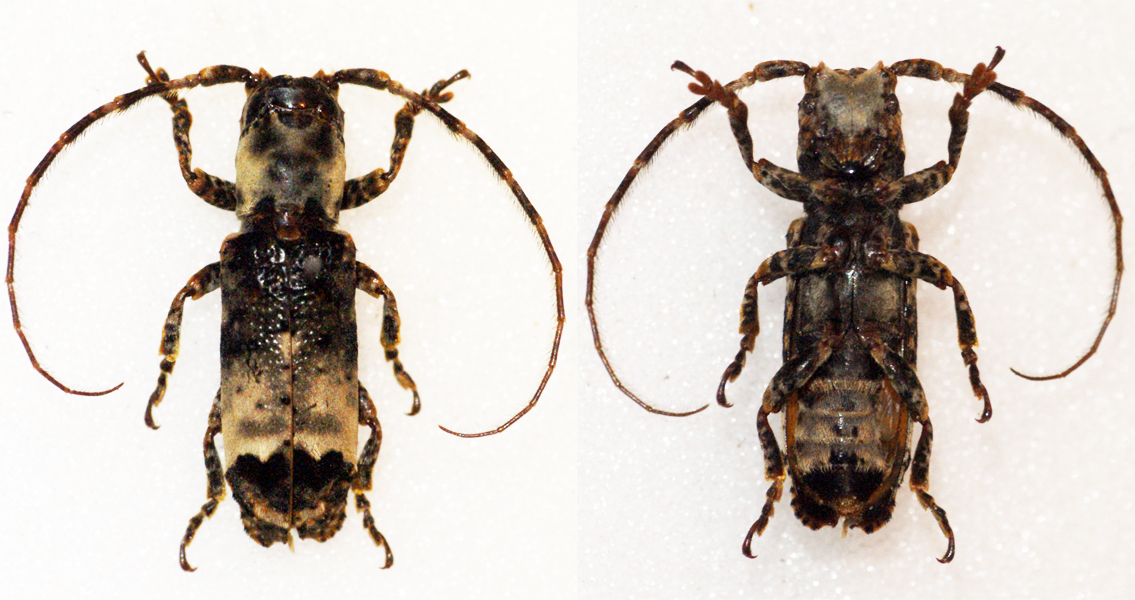

Scientific classification
- Kingdom: Animalia
- Phylum: Arthropoda
- Class: Insecta
- Order: Coleoptera
- Suborder: Polyphaga
- Infraorder: Cucujiformia
- Family: Cerambycidae
- Genus: Cymatura
- Species: C. fasciata

Binomial name
- Cymatura fasciata (Guérin-Méneville, 1849)

Synonyms
- Xylorhiza fasciata Guérin-Méneville, 1849

= Cymatura fasciata =

Species of beetle

Cymatura fasciata is a species of beetle in the family Cerambycidae. It was described by Félix Édouard Guérin-Méneville in 1849. It has a wide distribution in Africa.
