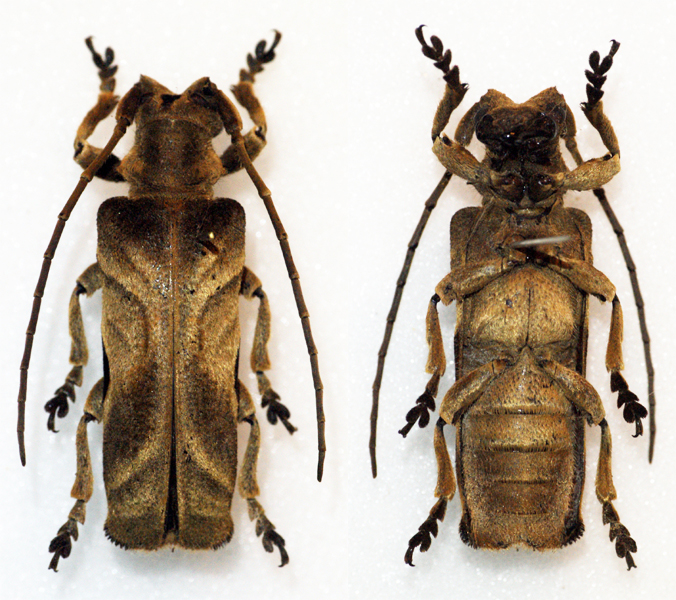
- Thylactus insignis (female)

Scientific classification
- Domain: Eukaryota
- Kingdom: Animalia
- Phylum: Arthropoda
- Class: Insecta
- Order: Coleoptera
- Suborder: Polyphaga
- Infraorder: Cucujiformia
- Family: Cerambycidae
- Genus: Thylactus
- Species: T. insignis

Binomial name
- Thylactus insignis Gahan, 1890

= Thylactus insignis =

Species of beetle

Thylactus insignis is a species of beetle in the family Cerambycidae. It was described by Charles Joseph Gahan in 1890. It has a wide distribution in Africa.
