= Cymatura nyassica =

Scientific classification
- Kingdom: Animalia
- Phylum: Arthropoda
- Class: Insecta
- Order: Coleoptera
- Suborder: Polyphaga
- Infraorder: Cucujiformia
- Family: Cerambycidae
- Genus: Cymatura
- Species: C. nyassica

Binomial name
- Cymatura nyassica Breuning, 1935

Species of beetle

Cymatura nyassica is a species of beetle in the family Cerambycidae. It was described by Stephan von Breuning in 1935. It is known from Tanzania, Malawi, and Zimbabwe.

== Subspecies ==
- Cymatura nyassica nyassica Breuning, 1935
- Cymatura nyassica rhodesica Breuning, 1964
