= Cymatura strandi =

Scientific classification
- Kingdom: Animalia
- Phylum: Arthropoda
- Class: Insecta
- Order: Coleoptera
- Suborder: Polyphaga
- Infraorder: Cucujiformia
- Family: Cerambycidae
- Genus: Cymatura
- Species: C. strandi

Binomial name
- Cymatura strandi Breuning, 1935

Synonyms
- Cymatura mrazeki Breuning, 1966

Species of beetle

Cymatura strandi is a species of beetle in the family Cerambycidae. It was described by Stephan von Breuning in 1935. It is known from the Ivory Coast, the Democratic Republic of the Congo, Ghana, Cameroon, Guinea, Togo, and Sierra Leone.
