= Thylactus filipinus =

Scientific classification
- Domain: Eukaryota
- Kingdom: Animalia
- Phylum: Arthropoda
- Class: Insecta
- Order: Coleoptera
- Suborder: Polyphaga
- Infraorder: Cucujiformia
- Family: Cerambycidae
- Genus: Thylactus
- Species: T. filipinus

Binomial name
- Thylactus filipinus Vives, 2013

Species of beetle

Thylactus filipinus is a species of beetle in the family Cerambycidae. It was described by Vives in 2013. It is known from the Philippines.
