= Thylactus uniformis =

Scientific classification
- Kingdom: Animalia
- Phylum: Arthropoda
- Class: Insecta
- Order: Coleoptera
- Suborder: Polyphaga
- Infraorder: Cucujiformia
- Family: Cerambycidae
- Genus: Thylactus
- Species: T. uniformis

Binomial name
- Thylactus uniformis Pic, 1934

Species of beetle

Thylactus uniformis is a species of beetle in the family Cerambycidae. It was described by Maurice Pic in 1934. It is known from China.
