= Cymatura wallabergeri =

Scientific classification
- Kingdom: Animalia
- Phylum: Arthropoda
- Class: Insecta
- Order: Coleoptera
- Suborder: Polyphaga
- Infraorder: Cucujiformia
- Family: Cerambycidae
- Genus: Cymatura
- Species: C. wallabergeri

Binomial name
- Cymatura wallabergeri Adlbauer, 1994

Species of beetle

Cymatura wallabergeri is a species of beetle in the family Cerambycidae. It was described by Adlbauer in 1994. It is known from Zimbabwe and South Africa.
