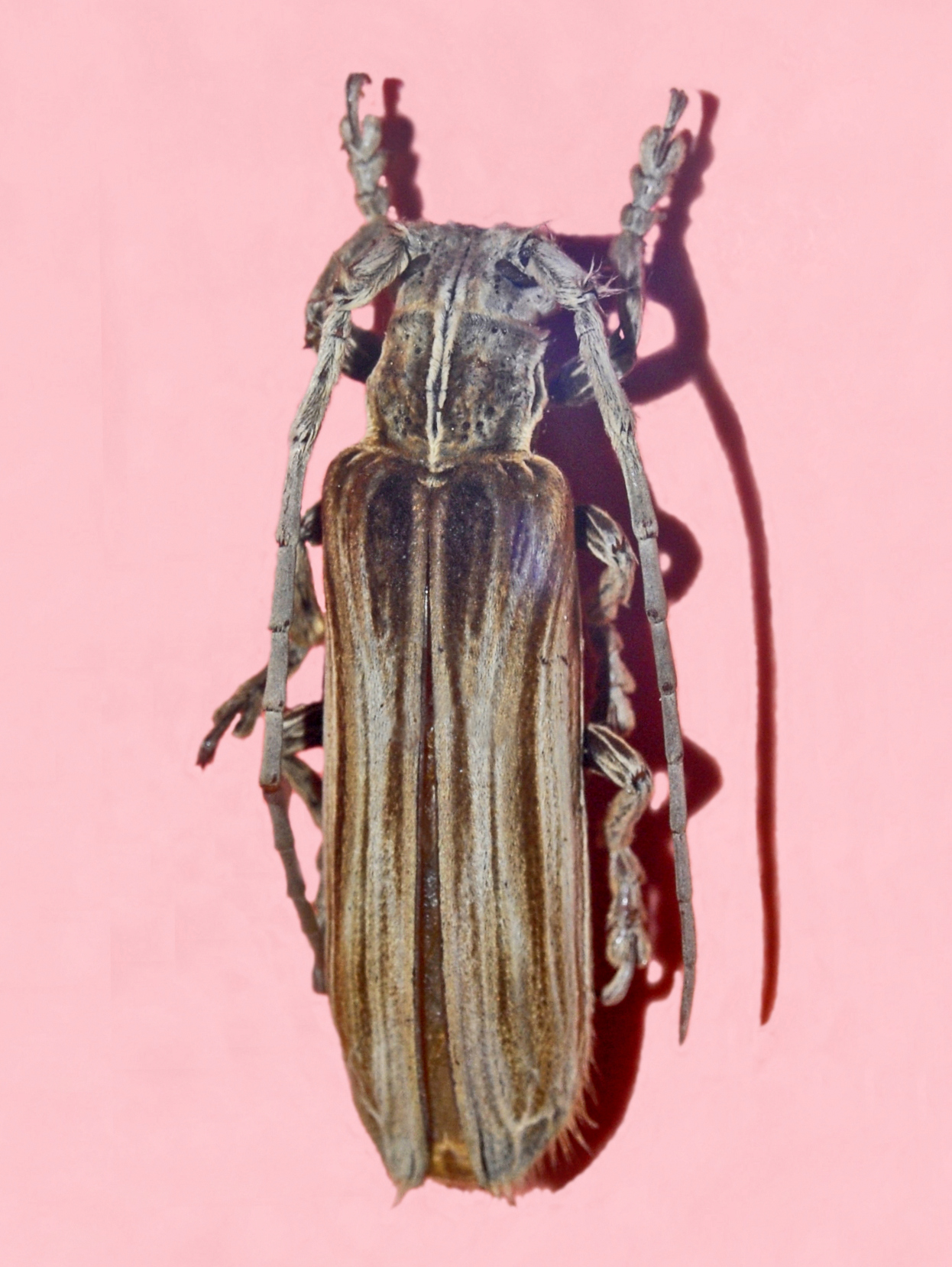
- Museum specimen of Xylorhiza adusta

Scientific classification
- Kingdom: Animalia
- Phylum: Arthropoda
- Class: Insecta
- Order: Coleoptera
- Suborder: Polyphaga
- Infraorder: Cucujiformia
- Family: Cerambycidae
- Genus: Xylorhiza
- Species: X. adusta

Binomial name
- Xylorhiza adusta (Wiedemann, 1819)

Synonyms
- Lamia adusta Wiedemann, 1819; Xylorhiza venosa Laporte de Castelnau, 1840

= Xylorhiza adusta =

Species of beetle

Xylorhiza adusta is a species of beetles in the longhorn beetle family (Cerambycidae).

== Description ==
Xylorhiza adusta can reach a length of about 35–40 millimetres (1.4–1.6 in). The background color of this mimetic bark-like long-horned borer is greyish-brown, with dark brown longitudinal lines on the hairy elytra. Main host plants include Callicarpa arborea, Callicarpa macrophylla, Premna pyramidata, Viburnum odoratissimum and Wrightia tinctoria.

== Distribution ==
This widespread species can be found in Cambodia, China, India, Laos, Malaysia, Myanmar, Sri Lanka, Sumatra, Taiwan, Thailand and Vietnam.
