= Thylactus umbilicatus =

Scientific classification
- Domain: Eukaryota
- Kingdom: Animalia
- Phylum: Arthropoda
- Class: Insecta
- Order: Coleoptera
- Suborder: Polyphaga
- Infraorder: Cucujiformia
- Family: Cerambycidae
- Genus: Thylactus
- Species: T. umbilicatus

Binomial name
- Thylactus umbilicatus Hüdepohl, 1990

Species of beetle

Thylactus umbilicatus is a species of beetle in the family Cerambycidae. It was described by Karl-Ernst Hüdepohl in 1990.
