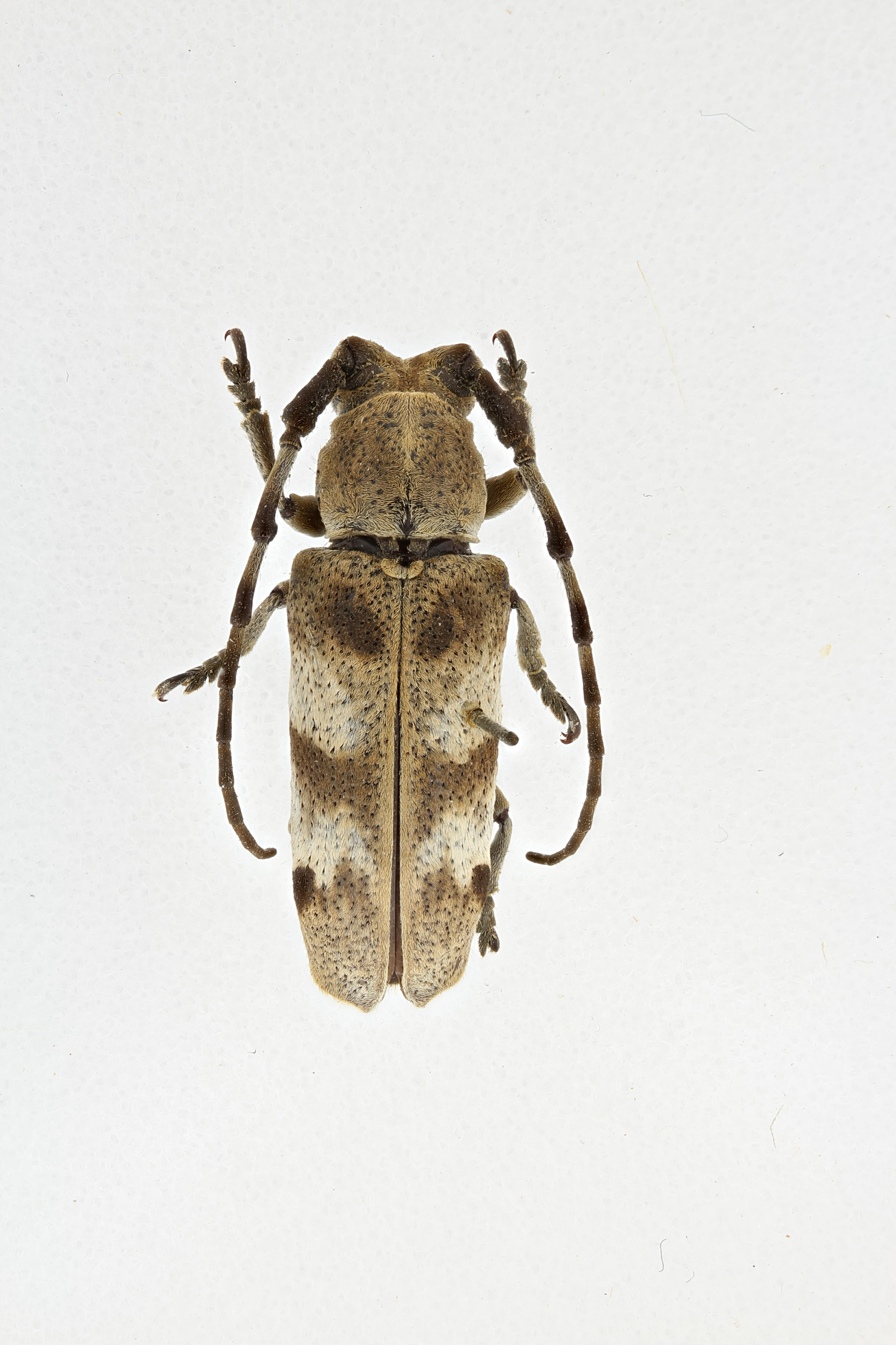
- Aetholopus scalaris

Scientific classification
- Domain: Eukaryota
- Kingdom: Animalia
- Phylum: Arthropoda
- Class: Insecta
- Order: Coleoptera
- Suborder: Polyphaga
- Infraorder: Cucujiformia
- Family: Cerambycidae
- Subfamily: Lamiinae
- Tribe: Xylorhizini
- Genus: Aetholopus; Pascoe, 1865

= Aetholopus =

Genus of beetles

Aetholopus is a genus of longhorn beetles of the subfamily Lamiinae, containing the following species:

- Aetholopus exutus Pascoe, 1865
- Aetholopus halmaheirae Breuning, 1982
- Aetholopus lumawigi Hayashi, 1976
- Aetholopus papuanus Breuning, 1948
- Aetholopus scalaris Pascoe, 1865
- Aetholopus sericeus Breuning, 1938
- Aetholopus thylactoides Breuning, 1958
