= Parathylactus =

Scientific classification
- Kingdom: Animalia
- Phylum: Arthropoda
- Class: Insecta
- Order: Coleoptera
- Suborder: Polyphaga
- Infraorder: Cucujiformia
- Family: Cerambycidae
- Tribe: Xylorhizini
- Genus: Parathylactus

Genus of beetles

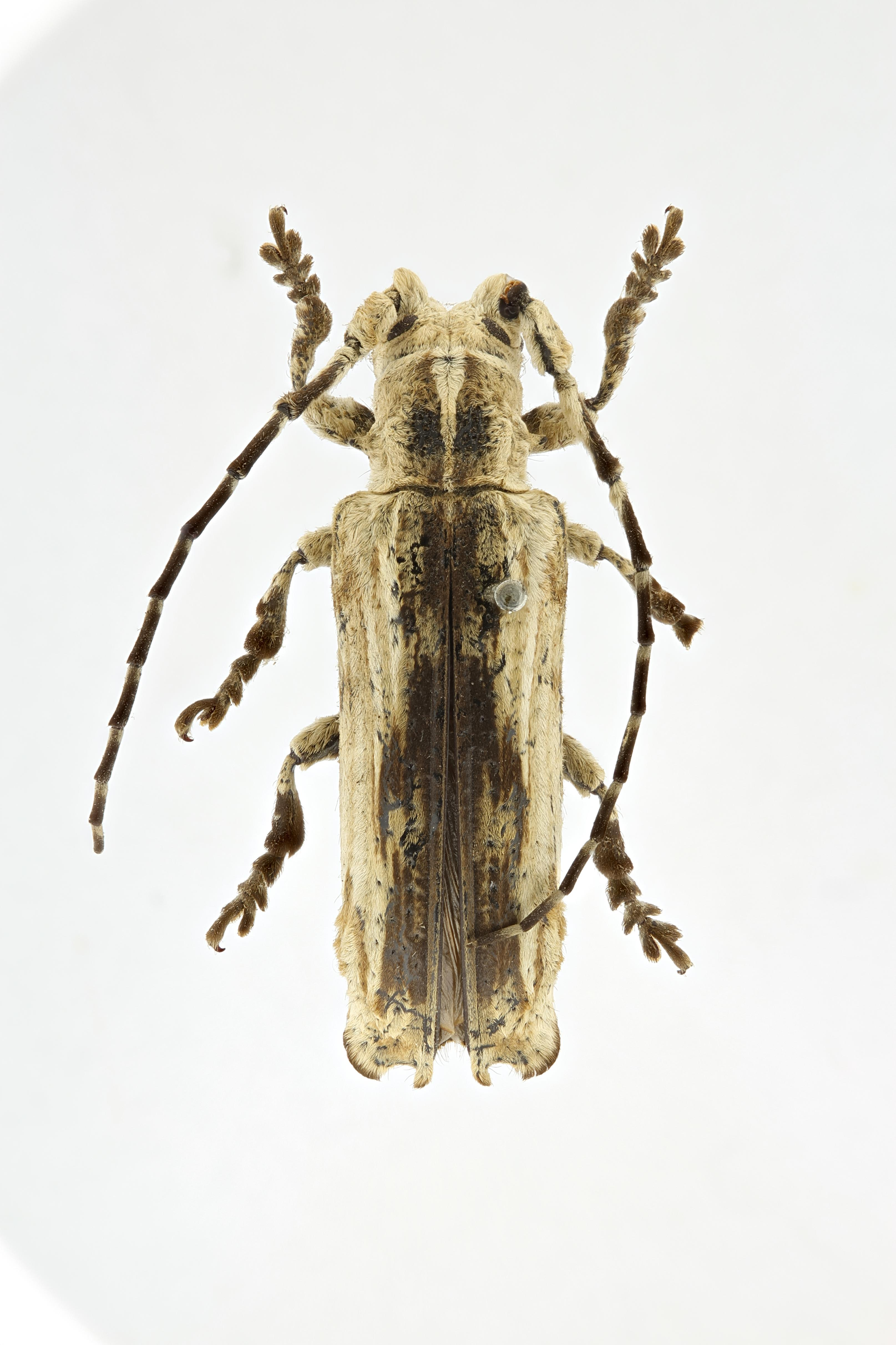
Parathylactus dorsalis

Parathylactus is a genus of longhorn beetles of the subfamily Lamiinae, containing the following species:

- Parathylactus dorsalis (Gahan, 1890)
- Parathylactus sumatranus Breuning & de Jong, 1941
