= Thylactus lettowvorbecki =

Scientific classification
- Kingdom: Animalia
- Phylum: Arthropoda
- Class: Insecta
- Order: Coleoptera
- Suborder: Polyphaga
- Infraorder: Cucujiformia
- Family: Cerambycidae
- Genus: Thylactus
- Species: T. lettowvorbecki

Binomial name
- Thylactus lettowvorbecki Kriesche, 1924

Synonyms
- Thylactus lettow-vorbecki Kriesche, 1924

Species of beetle

Thylactus lettowvorbecki is a species of beetle in the family Cerambycidae. It was described by Kriesche in 1924, originally published as "Thylactus lettow-vorbecki". It is known from Tanzania.
