= Aetholopus lumawigi =

Scientific classification
- Kingdom: Animalia
- Phylum: Arthropoda
- Class: Insecta
- Order: Coleoptera
- Suborder: Polyphaga
- Infraorder: Cucujiformia
- Family: Cerambycidae
- Genus: Aetholopus
- Species: A. lumawigi

Binomial name
- Aetholopus lumawigi Hayashi, 1976

Synonyms
- Aetholopus bimaculatus Hüdepohl, 1987

Species of beetle

Aetholopus lumawigi is a species of beetle in the family Cerambycidae. It was described by Masao Hayashi in 1976. It is known from the Philippines.
