= Cyrtogrammus sumatranus =

Scientific classification
- Kingdom: Animalia
- Phylum: Arthropoda
- Class: Insecta
- Order: Coleoptera
- Suborder: Polyphaga
- Infraorder: Cucujiformia
- Family: Cerambycidae
- Genus: Cyrtogrammus
- Species: C. sumatranus

Binomial name
- Cyrtogrammus sumatranus Franz, 1954

Species of beetle

Cyrtogrammus sumatranus is a species of beetle in the family Cerambycidae. It was described by Franz in 1954. It is known from Sumatra.
