= Cymatura holonigra =

Scientific classification
- Kingdom: Animalia
- Phylum: Arthropoda
- Class: Insecta
- Order: Coleoptera
- Suborder: Polyphaga
- Infraorder: Cucujiformia
- Family: Cerambycidae
- Genus: Cymatura
- Species: C. holonigra

Binomial name
- Cymatura holonigra Breuning, 1954

Species of beetle

Cymatura holonigra is a species of beetle in the family Cerambycidae. It was described by Stephan von Breuning in 1954. It is known from Tanzania and the Democratic Republic of the Congo.

== Subspecies ==
- Cymatura holonigra holonigra Breuning, 1954
- Cymatura holonigra longipilis Teocchi, 1989
