= Xylorhiza dohrnii =

Scientific classification
- Domain: Eukaryota
- Kingdom: Animalia
- Phylum: Arthropoda
- Class: Insecta
- Order: Coleoptera
- Suborder: Polyphaga
- Infraorder: Cucujiformia
- Family: Cerambycidae
- Genus: Xylorhiza
- Species: X. dohrnii

Binomial name
- Xylorhiza dohrnii Lansberge, 1880

Synonyms
- Xylorhiza dohrni (Lansberge)

Species of beetle

Xylorhiza dohrnii is a species of beetle in the family Cerambycidae. It was described by Lansberge in 1880. It is known from Indonesia.
