= Thylactus lateralis =

Scientific classification
- Kingdom: Animalia
- Phylum: Arthropoda
- Clade: Pancrustacea
- Class: Insecta
- Order: Coleoptera
- Suborder: Polyphaga
- Infraorder: Cucujiformia
- Family: Cerambycidae
- Genus: Thylactus
- Species: T. lateralis

Binomial name
- Thylactus lateralis Jordan, 1894

Synonyms
- Grammoxyla lateralis (Jordan, 1894)

Species of beetle

Thylactus lateralis is a species of beetle in the family Cerambycidae. It was described by Karl Jordan in 1894. It is known from Sumatra and Borneo.
