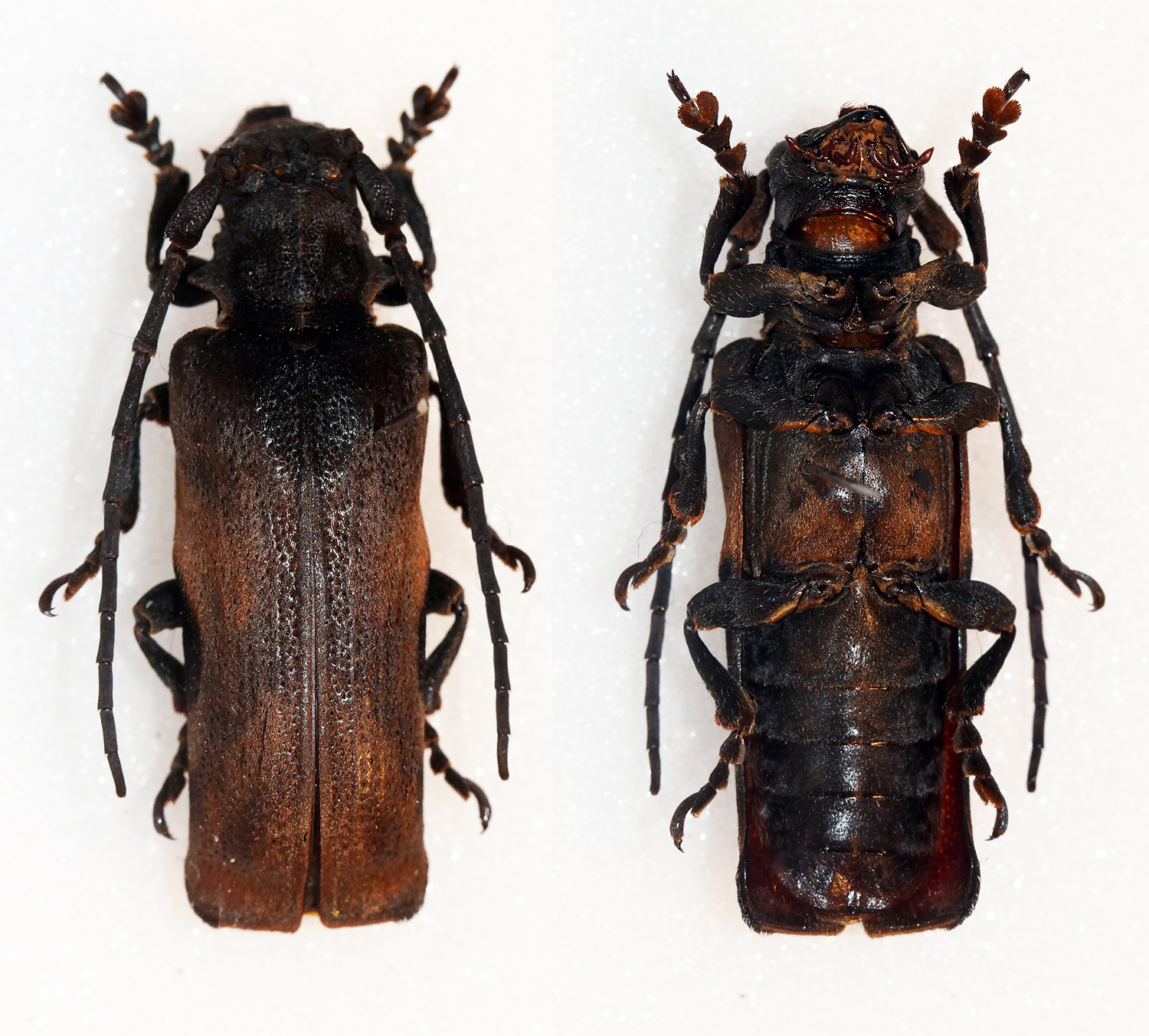
- Thylactus angularis

Scientific classification
- Domain: Eukaryota
- Kingdom: Animalia
- Phylum: Arthropoda
- Class: Insecta
- Order: Coleoptera
- Suborder: Polyphaga
- Infraorder: Cucujiformia
- Family: Cerambycidae
- Tribe: Xylorhizini
- Genus: Thylactus

= Thylactus =

Genus of beetles

Thylactus is a genus of longhorn beetles of the subfamily Lamiinae, containing the following species:

- Thylactus analis Franz, 1954
- Thylactus angularis Pascoe, 1866
- Thylactus chinensis Kriesche, 1924
- Thylactus densepunctatus Chiang & Li, 1984
- Thylactus dentipennis Wang & Jiang, 1998
- Thylactus filipinus Vives, 2013
- Thylactus insignis Gahan, 1890
- Thylactus itzingeri Breuning, 1935
- Thylactus javanicus Breuning, 1935
- Thylactus kinduensis Breuning, 1950
- Thylactus lateralis Jordan, 1894
- Thylactus lettowvorbecki Kriesche, 1924
- Thylactus mjoebergi Aurivillius, 1925
- Thylactus pulawskii Hua, 1986
- Thylactus sikkimensis Breuning, 1938
- Thylactus simulans Gahan, 1890
- Thylactus sumatrensis Hüdepohl, 1987
- Thylactus umbilicatus Hüdepohl, 1990
- Thylactus uniformis Pic, 1934
- Thylactus zuberhoferi (Thomson, 1878)
