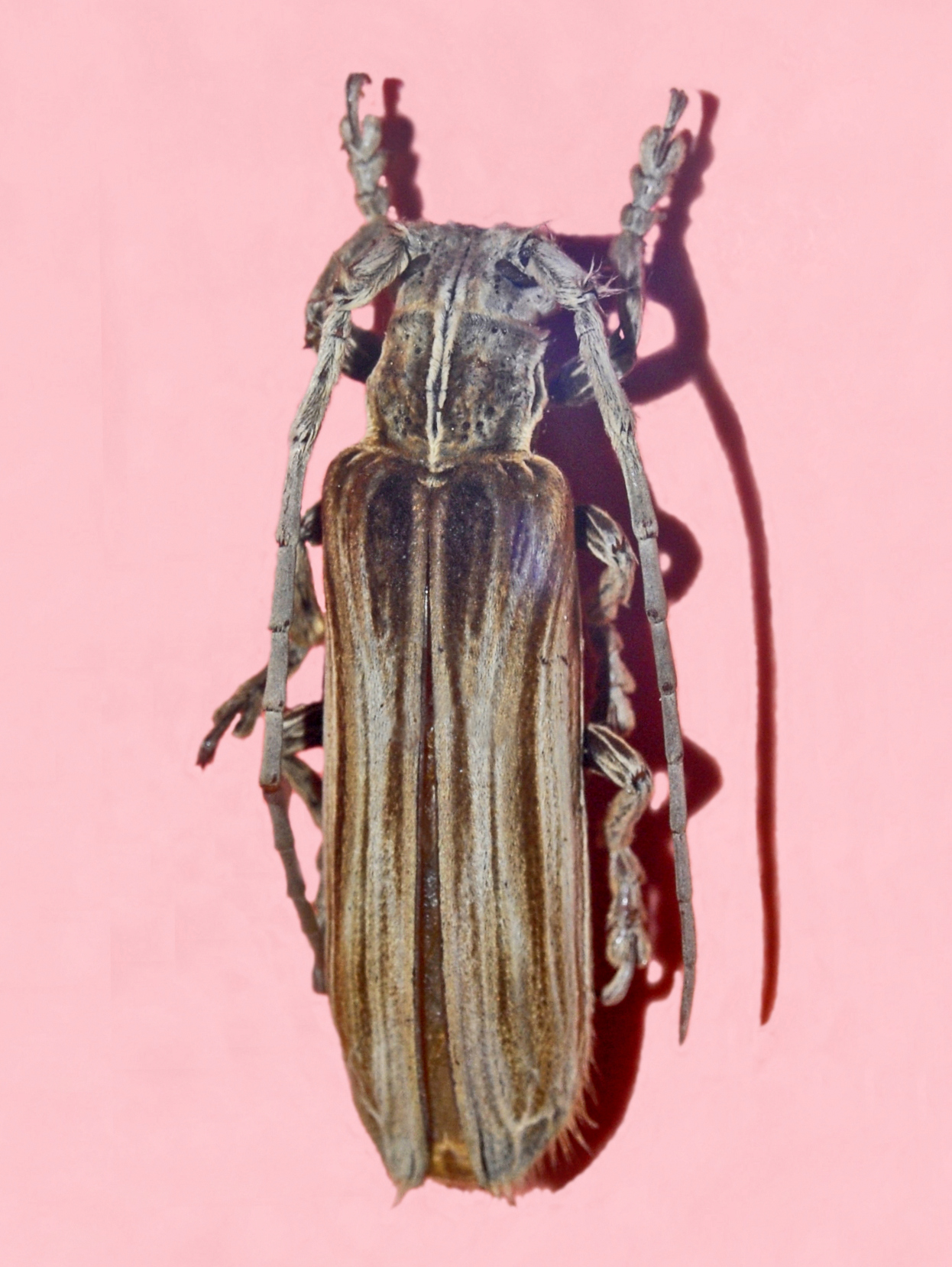
- Museum specimen of Xylorhiza adusta

Scientific classification
- Kingdom: Animalia
- Phylum: Arthropoda
- Class: Insecta
- Order: Coleoptera
- Suborder: Polyphaga
- Infraorder: Cucujiformia
- Family: Cerambycidae
- Subfamily: Lamiinae
- Tribe: Xylorhizini
- Genus: Xylorhiza; Dejean, 1835

= Xylorhiza (beetle) =

Genus of beetles

Xylorhiza is a genus of beetles in the longhorn beetle family (Cerambycidae).

== Species ==
- Xylorhiza adusta (Wiedemann, 1819)
- Xylorhiza dohrnii Lansberge, 1880
- Xylorhiza pilosipennis Breuning, 1943
