= Monstropalpus =

Scientific classification
- Kingdom: Animalia
- Phylum: Arthropoda
- Class: Insecta
- Order: Coleoptera
- Suborder: Polyphaga
- Infraorder: Cucujiformia
- Family: Cerambycidae
- Genus: Monstropalpus
- Species: M. helleri

Binomial name
- Monstropalpus helleri (Franz, 1953)

Genus of beetles

Monstropalpus helleri is a species of beetle in the family Cerambycidae, and the only species in the genus Monstropalpus. It was described by Franz in 1953. The larvae of Monstropalpus helleri usually bore into wood and can cause damage to living or felled wood.
