= Grammoxyla =

Scientific classification
- Kingdom: Animalia
- Phylum: Arthropoda
- Class: Insecta
- Order: Coleoptera
- Suborder: Polyphaga
- Infraorder: Cucujiformia
- Family: Cerambycidae
- Genus: Grammoxyla
- Species: G. hieroglyphica

Binomial name
- Grammoxyla hieroglyphica (Redtenbacher, 1868)

Genus of beetles

Grammoxyla hieroglyphica is a species of beetle in the family Cerambycidae, and the only species in the genus Grammoxyla. It was described by Redtenbacher in 1868.
