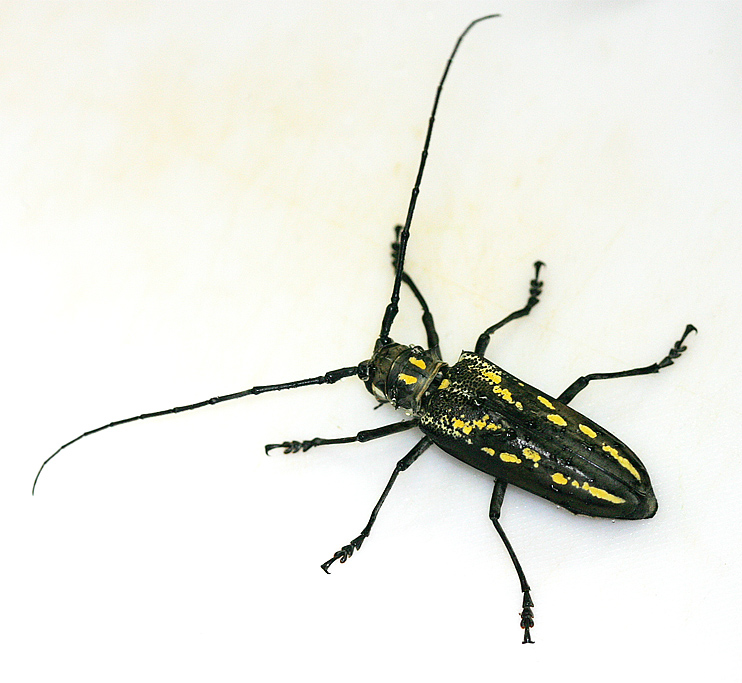
- Batocera lineolata

Scientific classification
- Domain: Eukaryota
- Kingdom: Animalia
- Phylum: Arthropoda
- Class: Insecta
- Order: Coleoptera
- Suborder: Polyphaga
- Infraorder: Cucujiformia
- Family: Cerambycidae
- Subfamily: Lamiinae
- Tribe: Batocerini; Lacordaire, 1869

= Batocerini =

Tribe of beetles

Batocerini is a tribe of longhorn beetles of the subfamily Lamiinae.

== Taxonomy ==
The genera that are included in the tribe are:

- Abatocera
- Apriona
- Aprionella
- Batocera
- Doesburgia
- Megacriodes
- Microcriodes
- Mimapriona
- Mimobatocera
- Rosenbergia
