= R. exigua =

R. exigua may refer to:

- Reicheia exigua, a ground beetle
- Rimularia exigua, a lichenized fungus
- Rosenbergia exigua, a longhorn beetle
