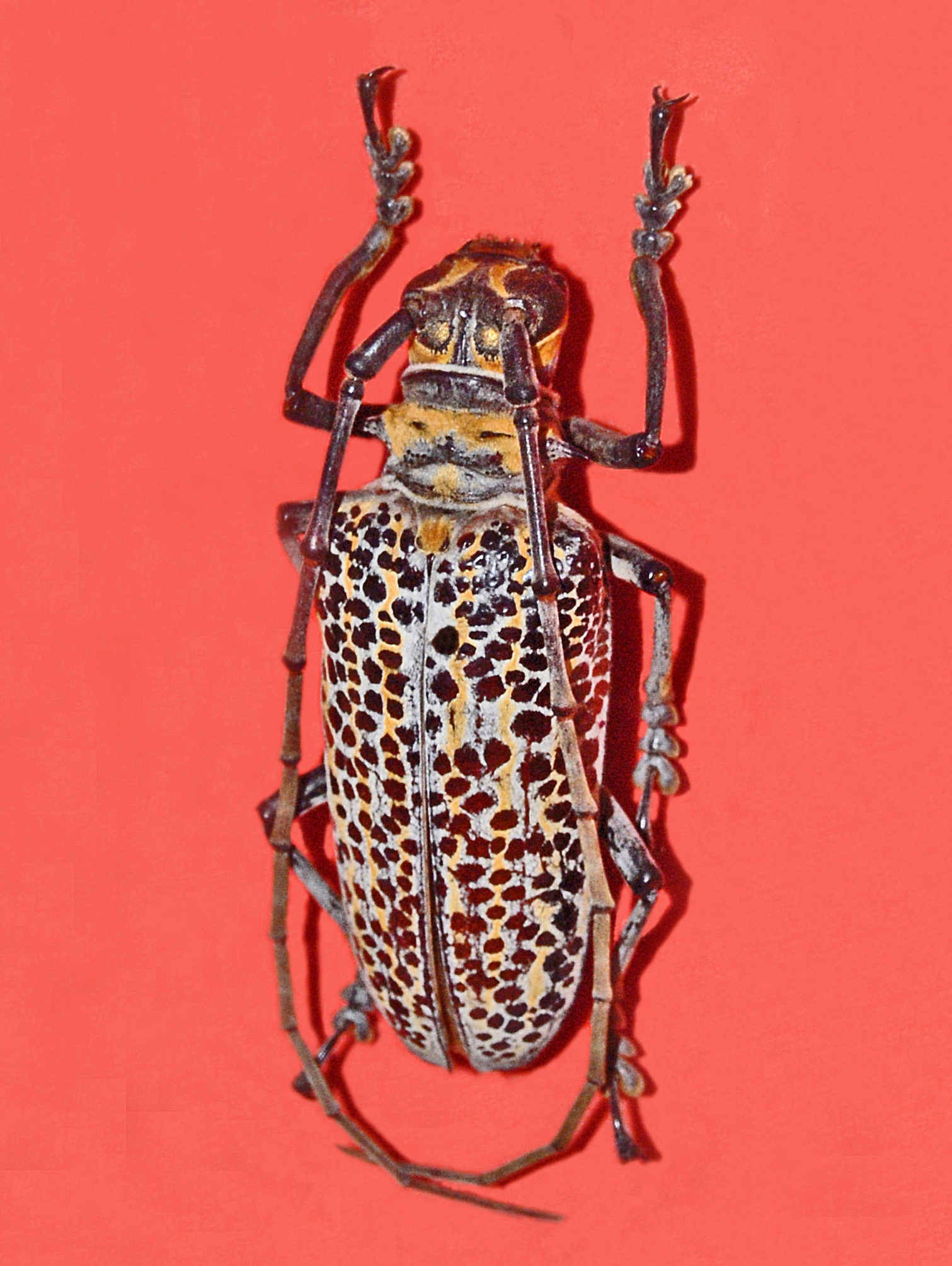
- Museum specimen of Rosenbergia rufolineata

Scientific classification
- Kingdom: Animalia
- Phylum: Arthropoda
- Class: Insecta
- Order: Coleoptera
- Suborder: Polyphaga
- Infraorder: Cucujiformia
- Family: Cerambycidae
- Genus: Rosenbergia
- Species: R. rufolineata

Binomial name
- Rosenbergia rufolineata von Breuning, 1948

Synonyms
- Rosenbergia straussi m. rufolineata Breuning, 1948; Rosenbergia straussi (Gestro) Auctorum

= Rosenbergia rufolineata =

Species of beetle

Rosenbergia rufolineata is a species of longhorn beetles in the subfamily Lamiinae.

== Description ==
Rosenbergia rufolineata can reach a length of about 50–70 millimetres (2.0–2.8 in). This longhorn beetle differs from Rosenbergia straussi for the orange longitudinal lines (hence the Latin name rufolineata) evident in most of the specimens.

== Distribution ==
This species can be found in New Guinea.
