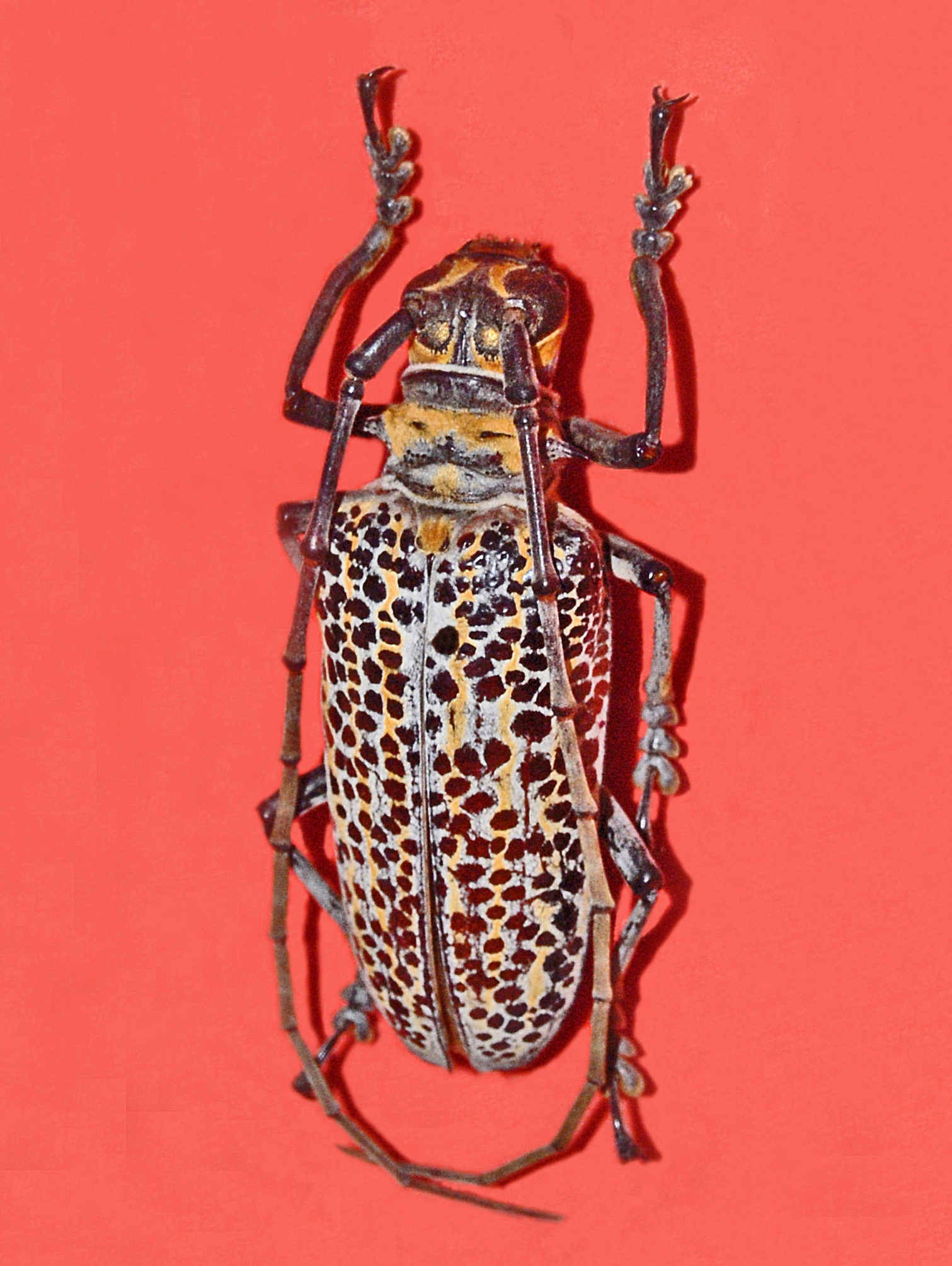
- Museum specimen of Rosenbergia rufolineata

Scientific classification
- Kingdom: Animalia
- Phylum: Arthropoda
- Class: Insecta
- Order: Coleoptera
- Suborder: Polyphaga
- Infraorder: Cucujiformia
- Family: Cerambycidae
- Subfamily: Lamiinae
- Tribe: Batocerini
- Genus: Rosenbergia; Ritsema, 1881

= Rosenbergia =

Genus of beetles

Rosenbergia is a genus of longhorn beetles in the subfamily Lamiinae, close to the genus Batocera.

== List of the described species and subspecies ==
- Rosenbergia bismarckiana Kriesche, 1920
- Rosenbergia breuningi Rigout, 1982
- Rosenbergia chaminadei Rigout, 2004
- Rosenbergia chicheryi Rigout, 1981
- Rosenbergia clarki Rigout, 1992
- Rosenbergia dankersi Rigout, 2004
- Rosenbergia darwini Casadio, 2008
- Rosenbergia denserugata Breuning, 1936
- Rosenbergia dianneae Allard, 1990
- Rosenbergia dianneae valentinae Rigout, 2004
- Rosenbergia drouini Rigout, 1992
- Rosenbergia ehrmanae Rigout, 1983
- Rosenbergia exigua Gahan, 1888
- Rosenbergia freneyi Rigout, 1988
- Rosenbergia gilmouri Rigout, 1982
- Rosenbergia hlaveki Rigout, 1992
- Rosenbergia hoyoisi Rigout, 1992
- Rosenbergia hudsoni Nylander, 2004
- Rosenbergia lactiflua Fairmaire, 1883
- Rosenbergia lepesmei Gilmour, 1960
- Rosenbergia mandibularis Ritsema, 1881
- Rosenbergia megalocephala van der Poll, 1886
- Rosenbergia porioni Rigout, 2004
- Rosenbergia porioni puspensatensis Rigout, 2004
- Rosenbergia rubra (Gilmour, 1966)
- Rosenbergia rubra fakfakensis (Rigout, 2004)
- Rosenbergia rufolineata Breuning, 1948
- Rosenbergia samuelsoni Rigout, 1982
- Rosenbergia schmitti Rigout, 1981
- Rosenbergia schneideri Rigout, 1994
- Rosenbergia scutellaris Aurivillius, 1924
- Rosenbergia straussi (Gestro, 1876)
- Rosenbergia umboi (Gilmour, 1960)
- Rosenbergia vetusta Ritsema, 1881
- Rosenbergia weiskei Heller, 1902
- Rosenbergia xenium Gilmour, 1959
