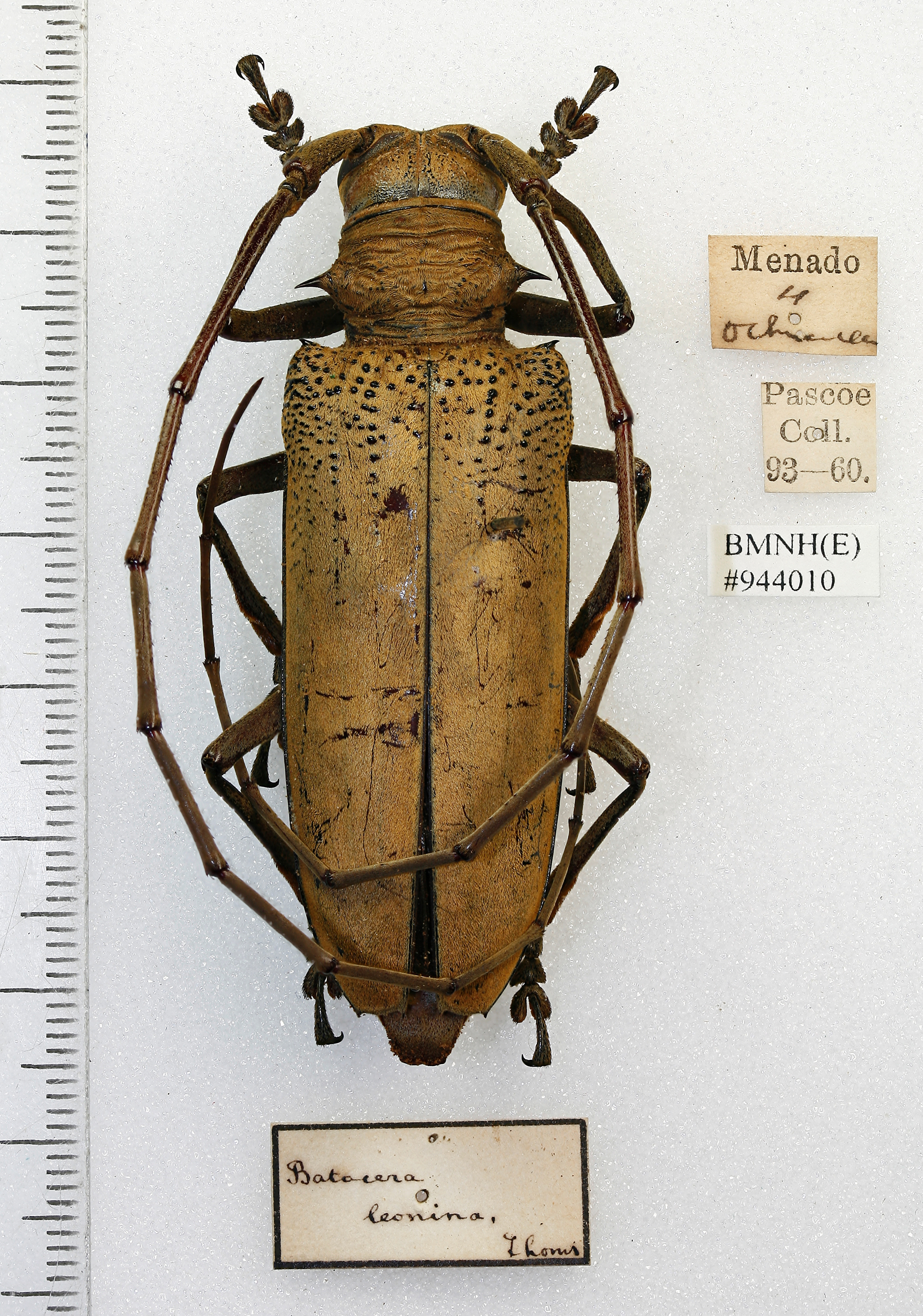

Scientific classification
- Domain: Eukaryota
- Kingdom: Animalia
- Phylum: Arthropoda
- Class: Insecta
- Order: Coleoptera
- Suborder: Polyphaga
- Infraorder: Cucujiformia
- Family: Cerambycidae
- Genus: Abatocera
- Species: A. leonina

Binomial name
- Abatocera leonina (Thomson, 1865)

Synonyms
- Batocera leonina Thomson, 1865

= Abatocera leonina =

Species of beetle

Abatocera leonina is a species of beetle in the family Cerambycidae. It was described by Thomson in 1865. It is known from the Philippines and the Celebes Islands.
