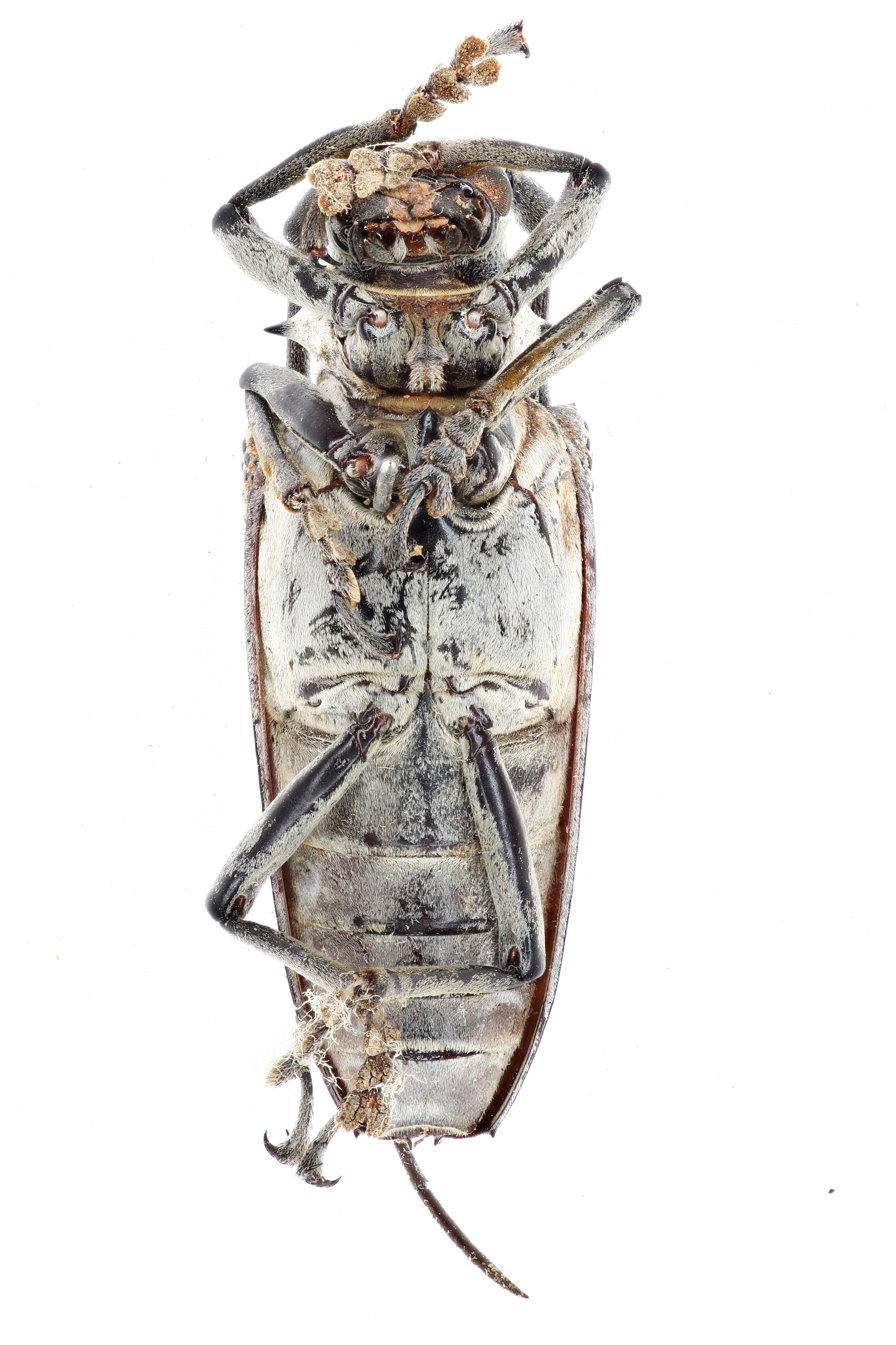

Scientific classification
- Domain: Eukaryota
- Kingdom: Animalia
- Phylum: Arthropoda
- Class: Insecta
- Order: Coleoptera
- Suborder: Polyphaga
- Infraorder: Cucujiformia
- Family: Cerambycidae
- Genus: Rosenbergia
- Species: R. porioni

Binomial name
- Rosenbergia porioni Rigout, 2004

= Rosenbergia porioni =

Species of beetle

Rosenbergia porioni is a species of beetle in the family Cerambycidae. It was described by Rigout in 2004.
