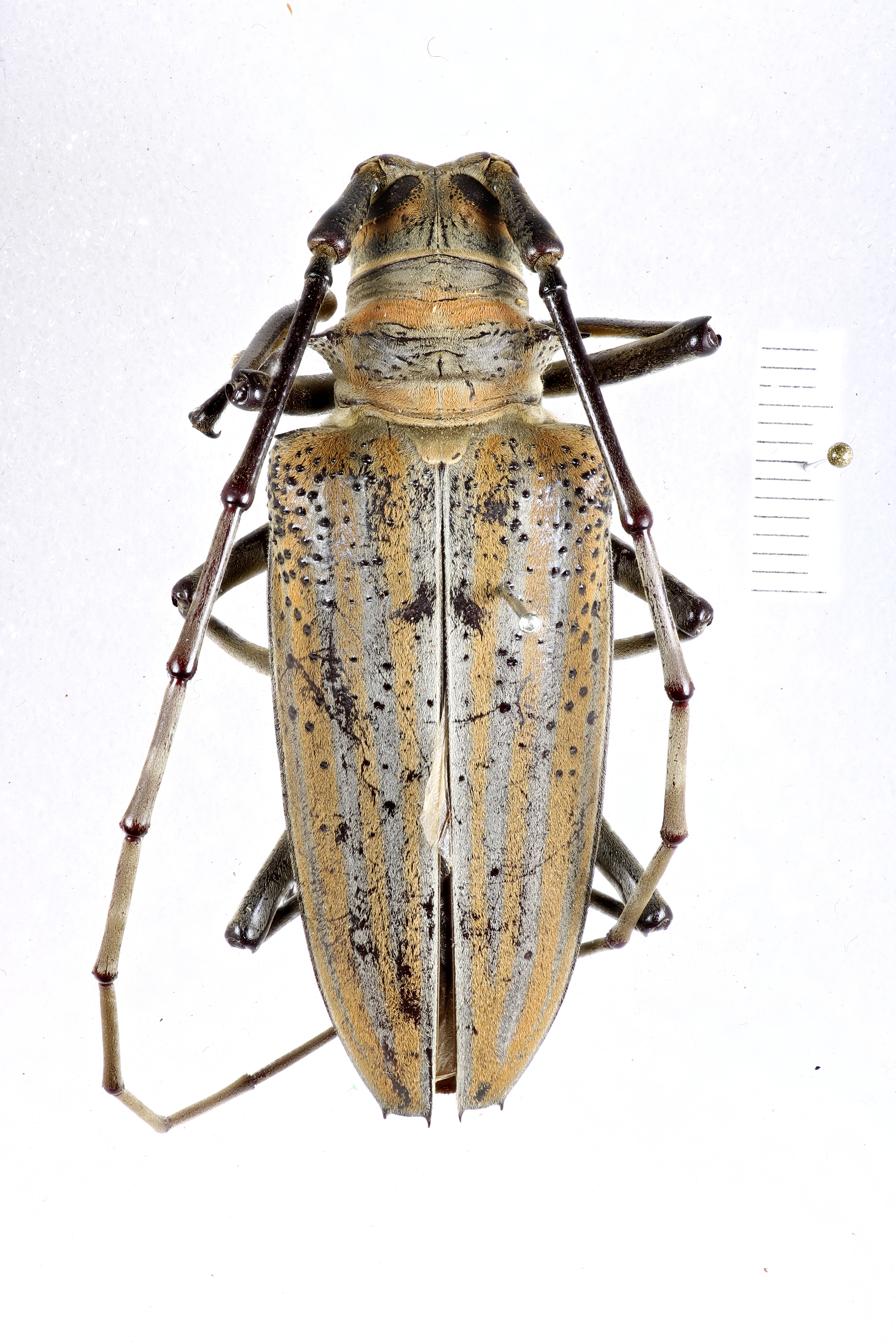
- Rosenbergia weiskei Heller

Scientific classification
- Domain: Eukaryota
- Kingdom: Animalia
- Phylum: Arthropoda
- Class: Insecta
- Order: Coleoptera
- Suborder: Polyphaga
- Infraorder: Cucujiformia
- Family: Cerambycidae
- Genus: Rosenbergia
- Species: R. weiskei

Binomial name
- Rosenbergia weiskei Heller, 1902

Synonyms
- Rosenbergia benningseni Aurivillius, 1908; Rosenbergia bolanica Gilmour, 1966; Rosenbergia griseolineata Gilmour, 1966; Rosenbergia griseovittata Gilmour, 1966; Rosenbergia rufovittata Breuning, 1948

= Rosenbergia weiskei =

Species of beetle

Rosenbergia weiskei is a species of beetle in the family Cerambycidae. It was described by Heller in 1902.
