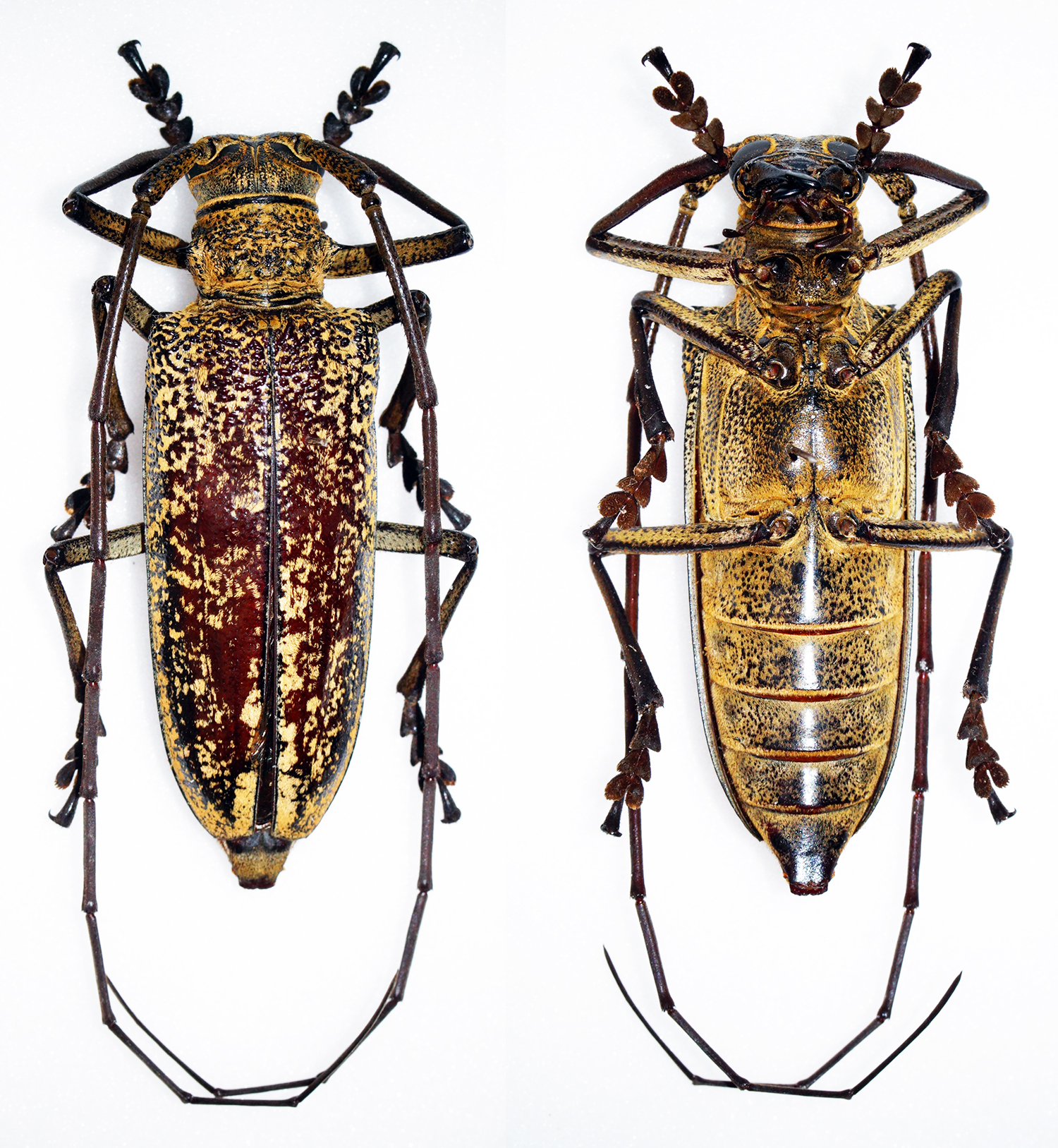

Scientific classification
- Domain: Eukaryota
- Kingdom: Animalia
- Phylum: Arthropoda
- Class: Insecta
- Order: Coleoptera
- Suborder: Polyphaga
- Infraorder: Cucujiformia
- Family: Cerambycidae
- Genus: Abatocera
- Species: A. irregularis

Binomial name
- Abatocera irregularis Vollenhoven, 1871

= Abatocera irregularis =

Species of beetle

Abatocera irregularis is a species of beetle in the family Cerambycidae. It was described by Vollenhoven in 1871. It is known from the Celebes Islands.
