= Rosenbergia freneyi =

Scientific classification
- Domain: Eukaryota
- Kingdom: Animalia
- Phylum: Arthropoda
- Class: Insecta
- Order: Coleoptera
- Suborder: Polyphaga
- Infraorder: Cucujiformia
- Family: Cerambycidae
- Genus: Rosenbergia
- Species: R. freneyi

Binomial name
- Rosenbergia freneyi Rigout, 1988

Species of beetle

Rosenbergia freneyi is a species of beetle in the family Cerambycidae. It was described by Rigout in 1988.
