= Rosenbergia clarki =

Scientific classification
- Domain: Eukaryota
- Kingdom: Animalia
- Phylum: Arthropoda
- Class: Insecta
- Order: Coleoptera
- Suborder: Polyphaga
- Infraorder: Cucujiformia
- Family: Cerambycidae
- Genus: Rosenbergia
- Species: R. clarki

Binomial name
- Rosenbergia clarki Rigout, 1992

Species of beetle

Rosenbergia clarki is a species of beetle in the family Cerambycidae. It was described by Rigout in 1992.
