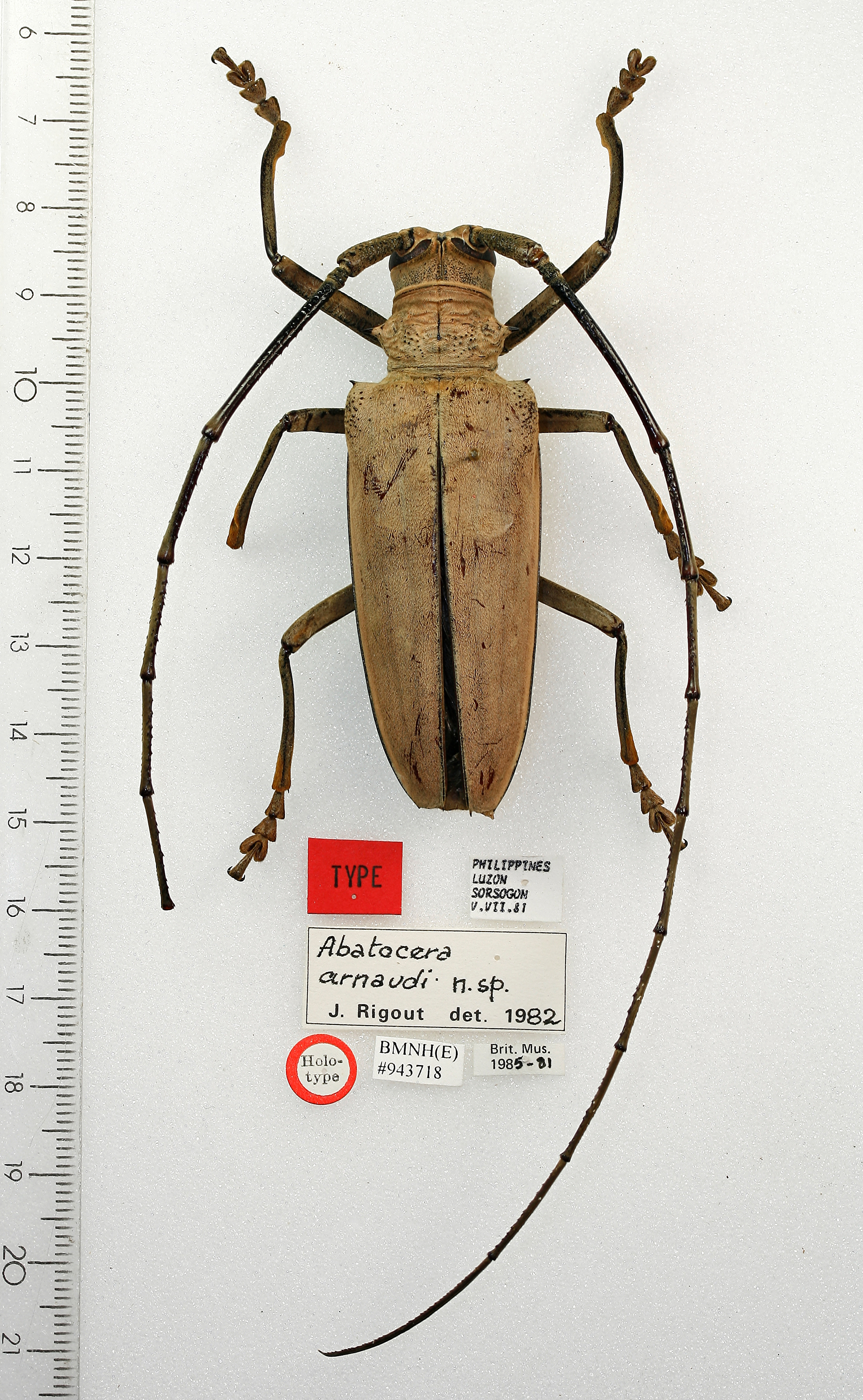

Scientific classification
- Domain: Eukaryota
- Kingdom: Animalia
- Phylum: Arthropoda
- Class: Insecta
- Order: Coleoptera
- Suborder: Polyphaga
- Infraorder: Cucujiformia
- Family: Cerambycidae
- Genus: Abatocera
- Species: A. arnaudi

Binomial name
- Abatocera arnaudi Rigout, 1987

= Abatocera arnaudi =

Species of beetle

Abatocera arnaudi is a species of beetle in the family Cerambycidae. It was described by Rigout in 1987. It is known from the Philippines.
