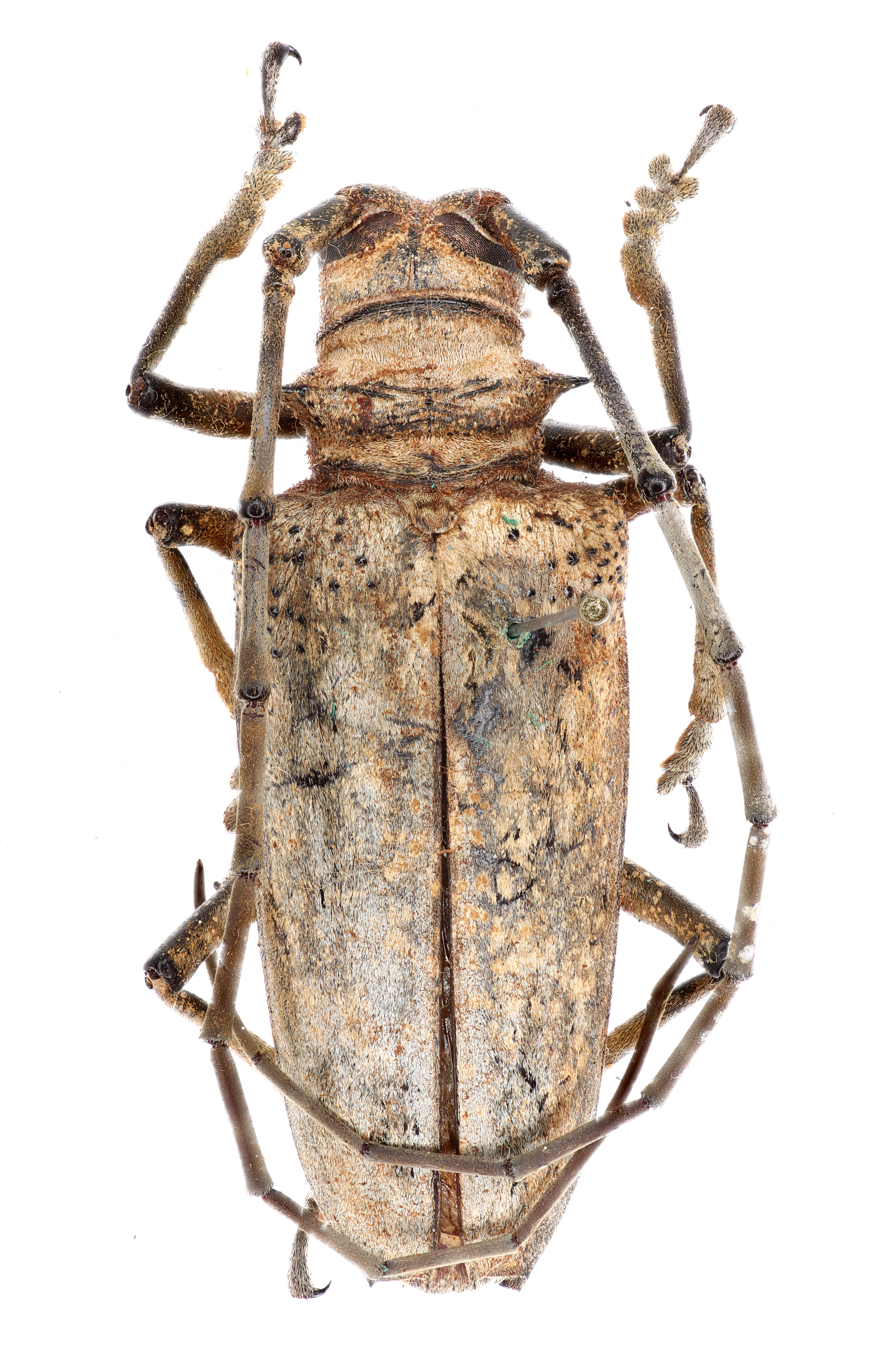

Scientific classification
- Domain: Eukaryota
- Kingdom: Animalia
- Phylum: Arthropoda
- Class: Insecta
- Order: Coleoptera
- Suborder: Polyphaga
- Infraorder: Cucujiformia
- Family: Cerambycidae
- Genus: Rosenbergia
- Species: R. lepesmei

Binomial name
- Rosenbergia lepesmei Gilmour, 1960

Synonyms
- Rosenbergia terraereginae Gilmour, 1960

= Rosenbergia lepesmei =

Species of beetle

Rosenbergia lepesmei is a species of beetle in the family Cerambycidae. It was described by Gilmour in 1960.
