= Rosenbergia umboi =

Scientific classification
- Domain: Eukaryota
- Kingdom: Animalia
- Phylum: Arthropoda
- Class: Insecta
- Order: Coleoptera
- Suborder: Polyphaga
- Infraorder: Cucujiformia
- Family: Cerambycidae
- Genus: Rosenbergia
- Species: R. umboi

Binomial name
- Rosenbergia umboi (Gilmour, 1960)

Species of beetle

Rosenbergia umboi is a species of beetle in the family Cerambycidae. It was described by Gilmour in 1960.
