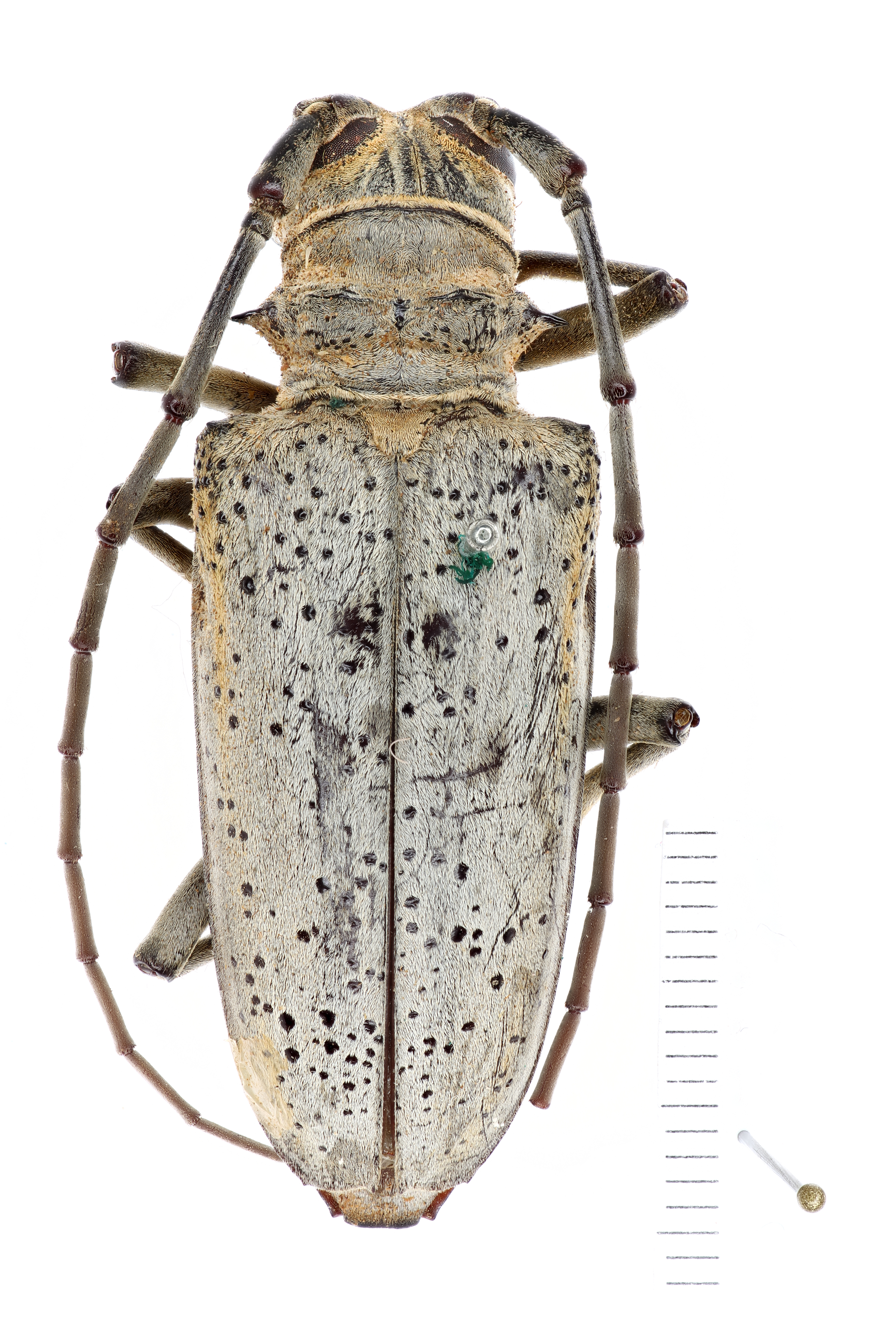

Scientific classification
- Domain: Eukaryota
- Kingdom: Animalia
- Phylum: Arthropoda
- Class: Insecta
- Order: Coleoptera
- Suborder: Polyphaga
- Infraorder: Cucujiformia
- Family: Cerambycidae
- Genus: Rosenbergia
- Species: R. megalocephala

Binomial name
- Rosenbergia megalocephala van der Poll, 1886

Synonyms
- Rosenbergia macrocephala Kriesche, 1919; Rosenbergia orangelineata Schwarzer, 1929

= Rosenbergia megalocephala =

Species of beetle

Rosenbergia megalocephala is a species of beetle in the family Cerambycidae. It was described by van der Poll in 1886. It is known from Australia.
