= Rosenbergia denserugata =

Scientific classification
- Kingdom: Animalia
- Phylum: Arthropoda
- Class: Insecta
- Order: Coleoptera
- Suborder: Polyphaga
- Infraorder: Cucujiformia
- Family: Cerambycidae
- Genus: Rosenbergia
- Species: R. denserugata

Binomial name
- Rosenbergia denserugata Breuning, 1936

Species of beetle

Rosenbergia denserugata is a species of beetle in the family Cerambycidae. It was described by Breuning in 1936.
