= Rosenbergia xenium =

Scientific classification
- Kingdom: Animalia
- Phylum: Arthropoda
- Class: Insecta
- Order: Coleoptera
- Suborder: Polyphaga
- Infraorder: Cucujiformia
- Family: Cerambycidae
- Genus: Rosenbergia
- Species: R. xenium

Binomial name
- Rosenbergia xenium Rigout, 1992

Synonyms
- Mimorosenbergia meeki Breuning, 1980; Rosenbergia hlaveki Rigout, 1992; Rosenbergia hoyoisi Rigout, 1992

Species of beetle

Rosenbergia xenium is a species of beetle in the family Cerambycidae. It was described by Rigout in 1992. It is known from Papua New Guinea.
