= Rosenbergia rubra =

Scientific classification
- Domain: Eukaryota
- Kingdom: Animalia
- Phylum: Arthropoda
- Class: Insecta
- Order: Coleoptera
- Suborder: Polyphaga
- Infraorder: Cucujiformia
- Family: Cerambycidae
- Genus: Rosenbergia
- Species: R. rubra

Binomial name
- Rosenbergia rubra (Gilmour, 1966)

Species of beetle

Rosenbergia rubra is a species of beetle in the family Cerambycidae. It was described by Gilmour in 1966.
