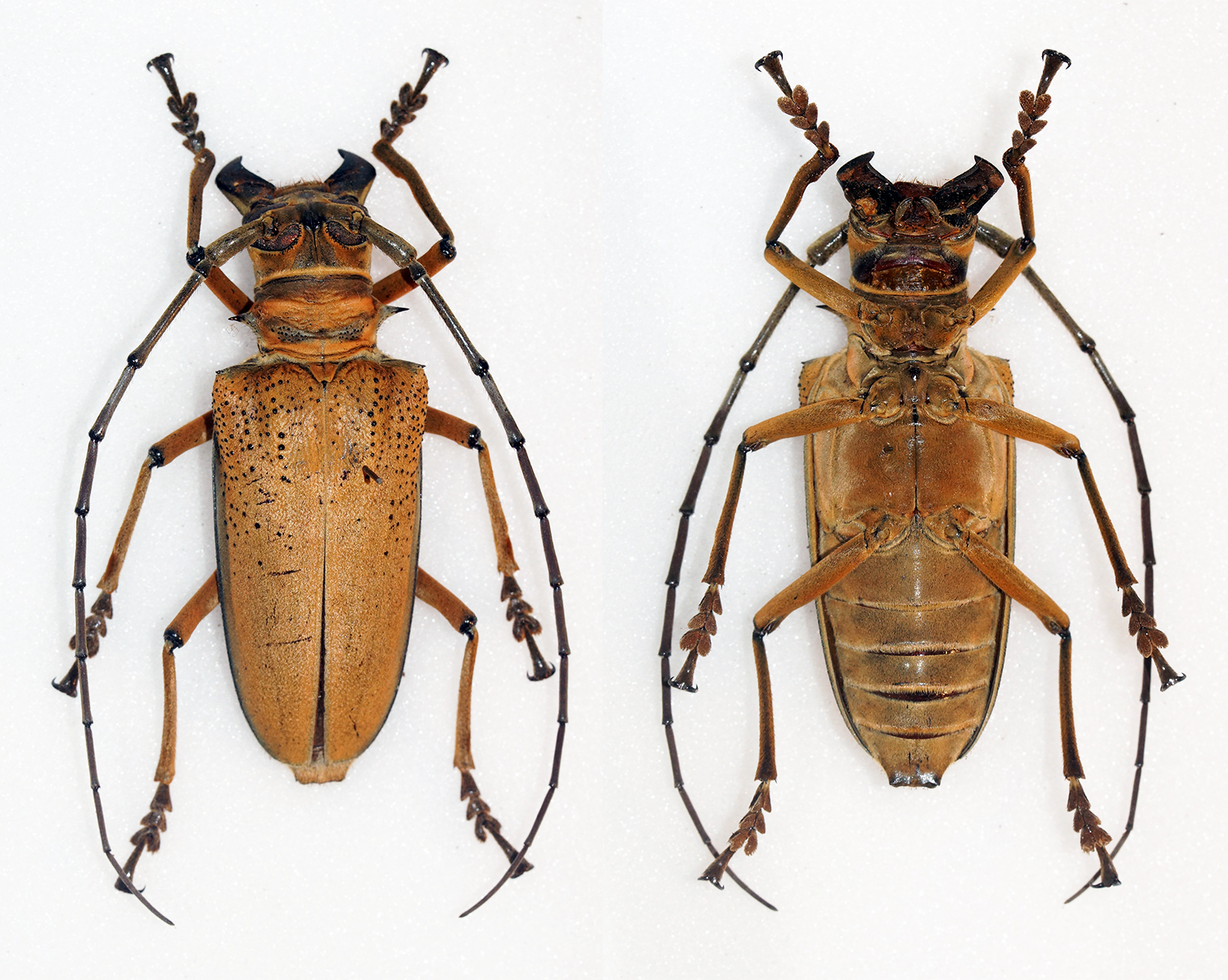

Scientific classification
- Domain: Eukaryota
- Kingdom: Animalia
- Phylum: Arthropoda
- Class: Insecta
- Order: Coleoptera
- Suborder: Polyphaga
- Infraorder: Cucujiformia
- Family: Cerambycidae
- Genus: Rosenbergia
- Species: R. mandibularis

Binomial name
- Rosenbergia mandibularis Ritsema, 1881

Synonyms
- Rosenbergia pseudomandibularis Gilmour, 1960; Rosenbergia rubroides Breuning, 1980

= Rosenbergia mandibularis =

Species of beetle

Rosenbergia mandibularis is a species of beetle in the family Cerambycidae. It was described by Coenraad Ritsema in 1881.
