= Rosenbergia scutellaris =

Scientific classification
- Domain: Eukaryota
- Kingdom: Animalia
- Phylum: Arthropoda
- Class: Insecta
- Order: Coleoptera
- Suborder: Polyphaga
- Infraorder: Cucujiformia
- Family: Cerambycidae
- Genus: Rosenbergia
- Species: R. scutellaris

Binomial name
- Rosenbergia scutellaris Aurivillius, 1924

Species of beetle

Rosenbergia scutellaris is a species of beetle in the family Cerambycidae. It was described by Per Olof Christopher Aurivillius in 1924.
