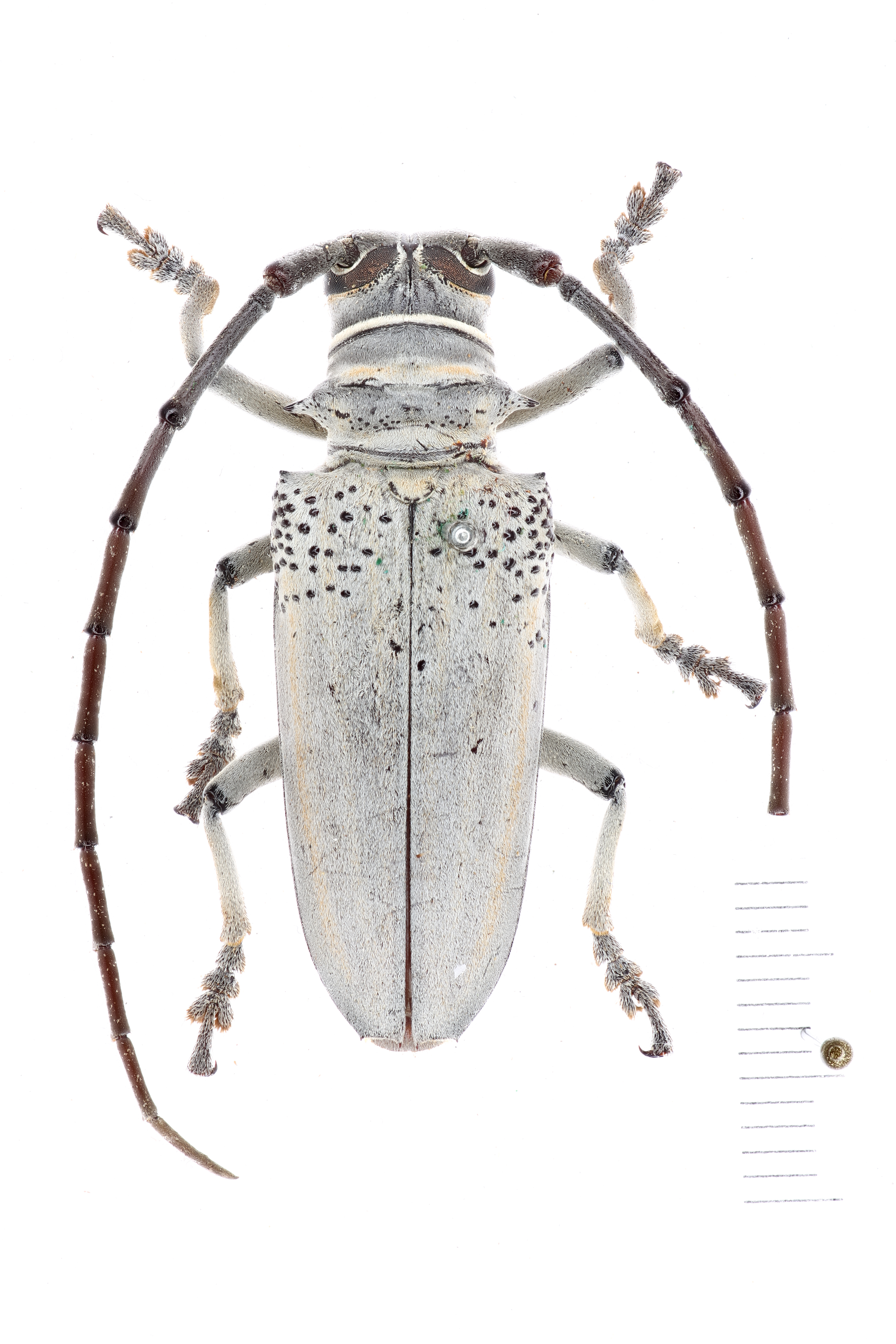
- Rosenbergia darwini, c.2008

Scientific classification
- Domain: Eukaryota
- Kingdom: Animalia
- Phylum: Arthropoda
- Class: Insecta
- Order: Coleoptera
- Suborder: Polyphaga
- Infraorder: Cucujiformia
- Family: Cerambycidae
- Genus: Rosenbergia
- Species: R. darwini

Binomial name
- Rosenbergia darwini Casadio, 2008

= Rosenbergia darwini =

Species of beetle

Rosenbergia darwini is a species of beetle in the family Cerambycidae. It was described by Casadio in 2008.
