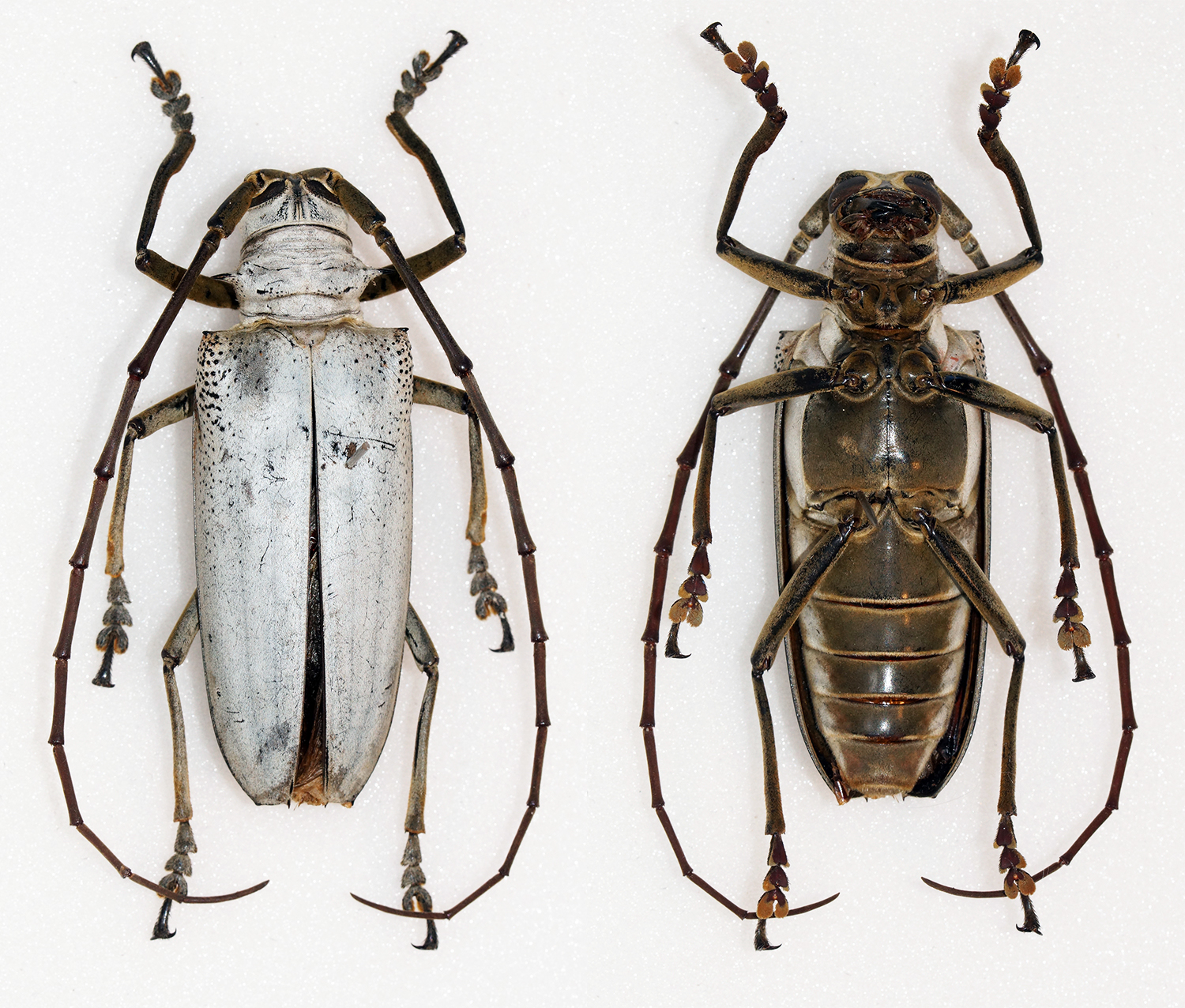
- Female

Scientific classification
- Kingdom: Animalia
- Phylum: Arthropoda
- Class: Insecta
- Order: Coleoptera
- Suborder: Polyphaga
- Infraorder: Cucujiformia
- Family: Cerambycidae
- Genus: Rosenbergia
- Species: R. lactiflua

Binomial name
- Rosenbergia lactiflua Fairmaire, 1883

Synonyms
- Rosenbergia franzi Gilmour, 1960; Rosenbergia papuana Kriesche, 1919; Rosenbergia salomonum Breuning, 1948

= Rosenbergia lactiflua =

Species of beetle

Rosenbergia lactiflua is a species of beetle in the family Cerambycidae. It was described by Fairmaire in 1883. It is known from Papua New Guinea and Solomon Islands. It includes the varietas Rosenbergia lactiflua var. coerulescens.
