= Rosenbergia bismarckiana =

Scientific classification
- Domain: Eukaryota
- Kingdom: Animalia
- Phylum: Arthropoda
- Class: Insecta
- Order: Coleoptera
- Suborder: Polyphaga
- Infraorder: Cucujiformia
- Family: Cerambycidae
- Genus: Rosenbergia
- Species: R. bismarckiana

Binomial name
- Rosenbergia bismarckiana Kriesche, 1920

Synonyms
- Rosenbergia albiventris Breuning, 1948; Rosenbergia lactiflua m. flavescens Breuning, 1948; Rosenbergia neopommerania Kriesche, 1919

Species of beetle

Rosenbergia bismarckiana is a species of beetle in the family Cerambycidae. It was described by Kriesche in 1920.
