= Rosenbergia dankersi =

Scientific classification
- Domain: Eukaryota
- Kingdom: Animalia
- Phylum: Arthropoda
- Class: Insecta
- Order: Coleoptera
- Suborder: Polyphaga
- Infraorder: Cucujiformia
- Family: Cerambycidae
- Genus: Rosenbergia
- Species: R. dankersi

Binomial name
- Rosenbergia dankersi Rigout, 2004

Species of beetle

Rosenbergia dankersi is a species of beetle in the family Cerambycidae. It was described by Rigout in 2004.
