= Rosenbergia vetusta =

Scientific classification
- Domain: Eukaryota
- Kingdom: Animalia
- Phylum: Arthropoda
- Class: Insecta
- Order: Coleoptera
- Suborder: Polyphaga
- Infraorder: Cucujiformia
- Family: Cerambycidae
- Genus: Rosenbergia
- Species: R. vetusta

Binomial name
- Rosenbergia vetusta Ritsema, 1881

Species of beetle

Rosenbergia vetusta is a species of beetle in the family Cerambycidae. It was described by Coenraad Ritsema in 1881. It is known from Papua New Guinea.
