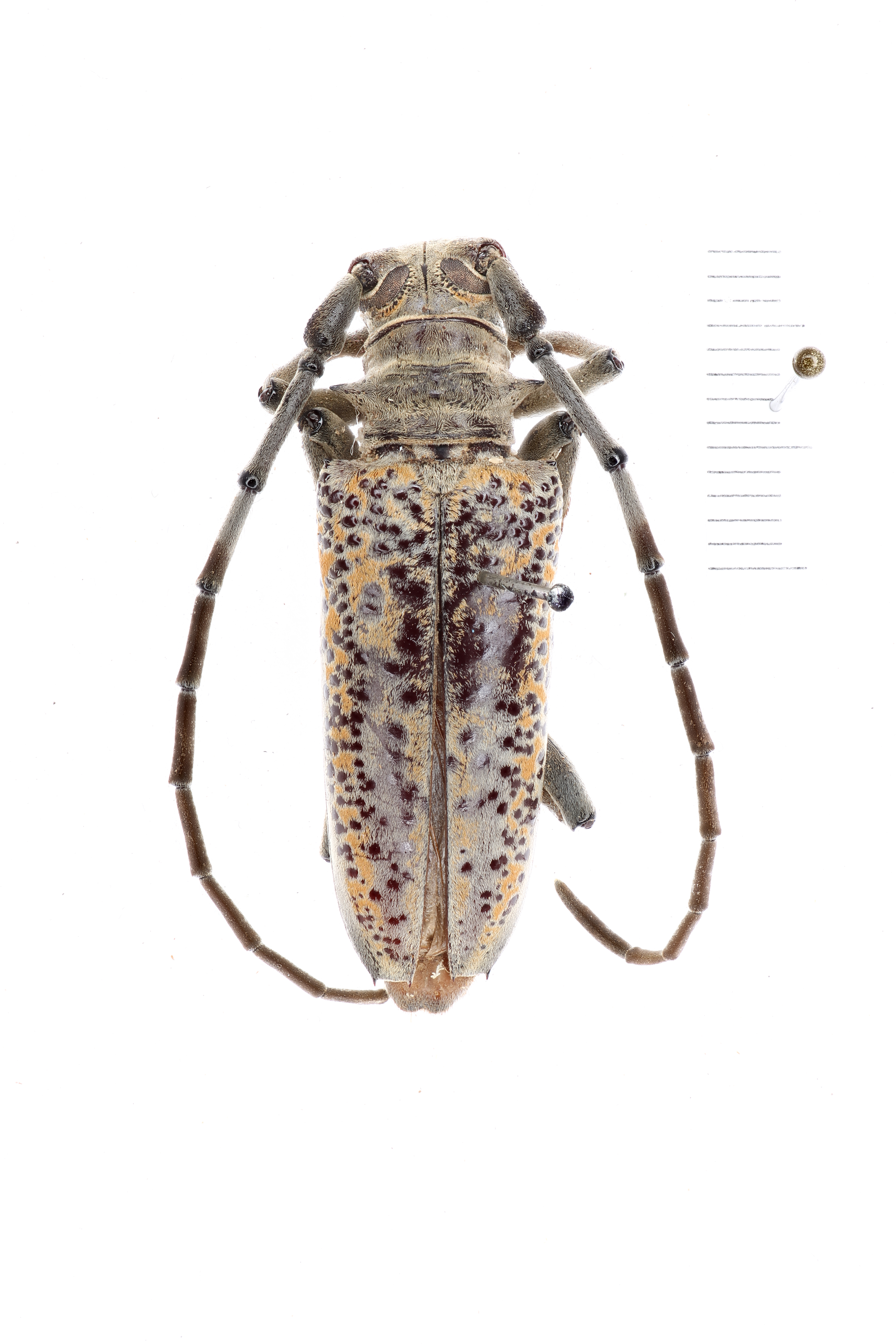

Scientific classification
- Domain: Eukaryota
- Kingdom: Animalia
- Phylum: Arthropoda
- Class: Insecta
- Order: Coleoptera
- Suborder: Polyphaga
- Infraorder: Cucujiformia
- Family: Cerambycidae
- Genus: Rosenbergia
- Species: R. exigua

Binomial name
- Rosenbergia exigua Gahan, 1888

= Rosenbergia exigua =

Species of beetle

Rosenbergia exigua is a longhorn beetle species found in New Guinea. It can grow to be up to 32 mm long. It was first described by Charles Joseph Gahan in 1888.
