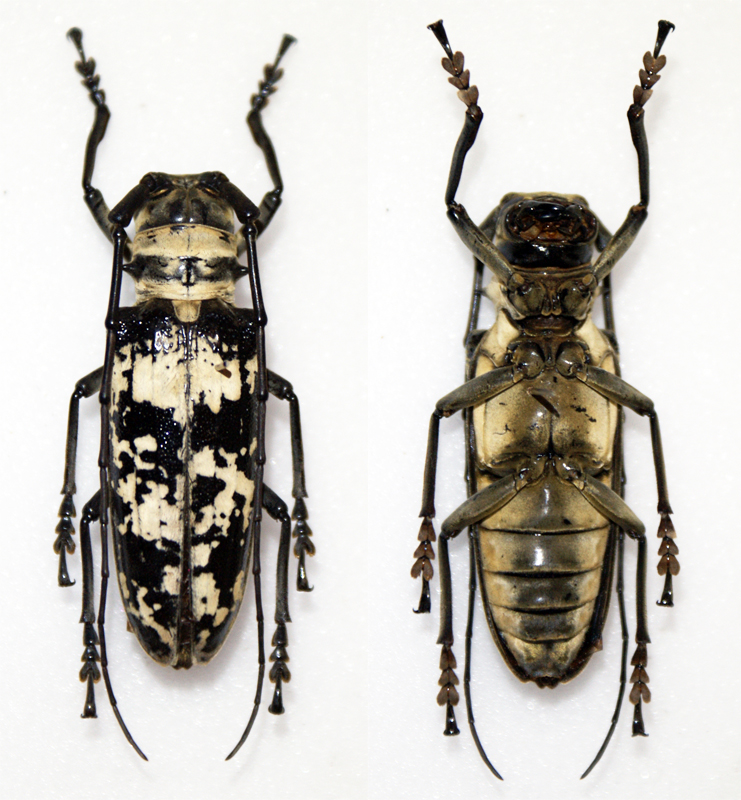

Scientific classification
- Kingdom: Animalia
- Phylum: Arthropoda
- Class: Insecta
- Order: Coleoptera
- Suborder: Polyphaga
- Infraorder: Cucujiformia
- Family: Cerambycidae
- Genus: Doesburgia
- Species: D. celebiana

Binomial name
- Doesburgia celebiana Tippmann, 1953

= Doesburgia =

Genus of beetles

Doesburgia celebiana is a species of beetle in the family Cerambycidae, and the only species in the genus Doesburgia. It was described by Tippmann in 1953. It was named after the Dutch town of Doesburg.
