= Rimularia exigua =

Scientific classification
- Domain: Eukaryota
- Kingdom: Fungi
- Division: Ascomycota
- Class: Lecanoromycetes
- Order: Baeomycetales
- Family: Trapeliaceae
- Genus: Rimularia
- Species: R. exigua

Binomial name
- Rimularia exigua Hertel & Rambold (1990)

Synonyms
- Rimularia exigua Hertel & Rambold (1989)

Species of lichen

Rimularia exigua is a species of lichen in the family Trapeliaceae. The type collection was found growing on boulders in a eucalypt forest in New South Wales.
