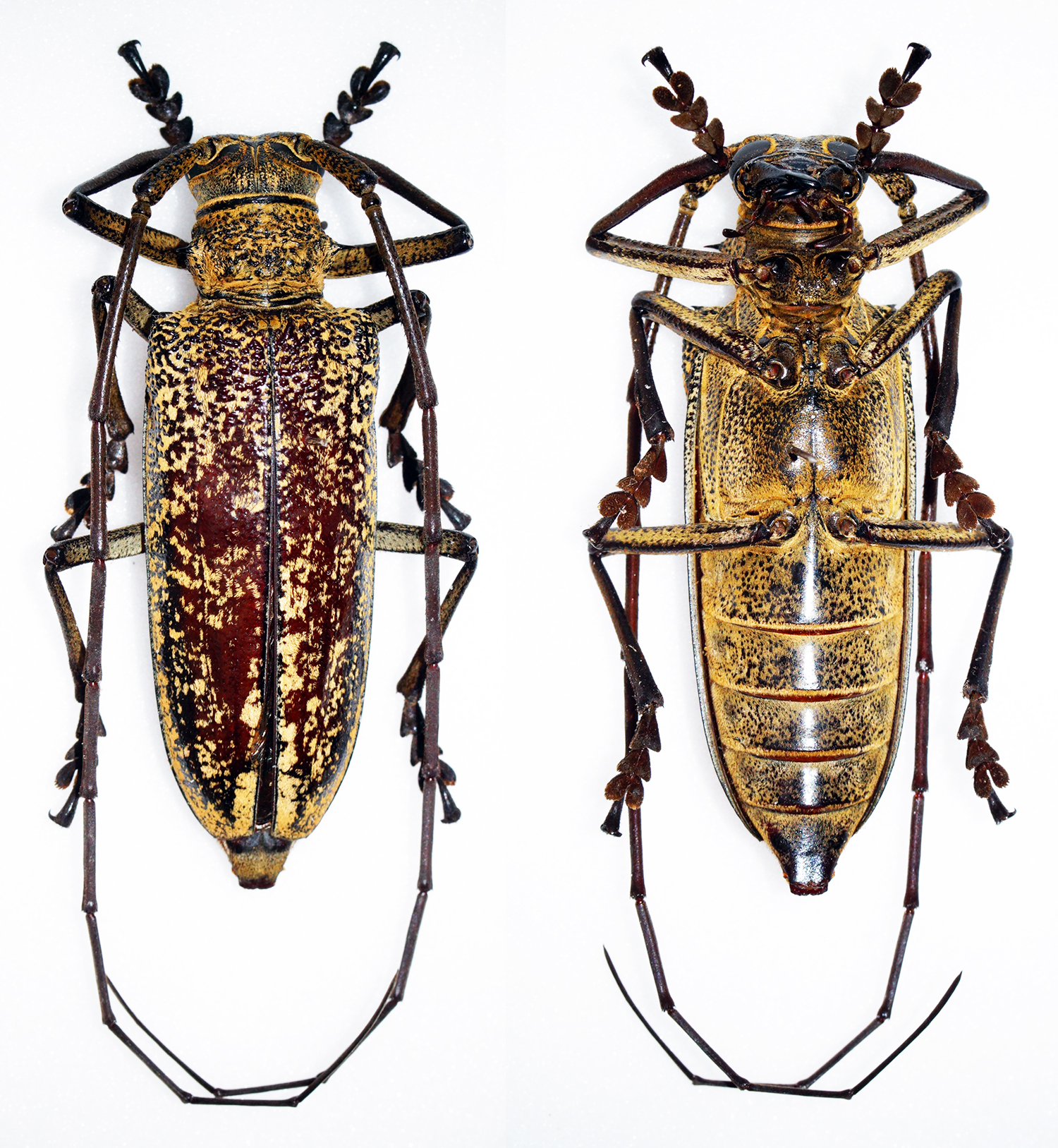
- Abatocera irregularis

Scientific classification
- Domain: Eukaryota
- Kingdom: Animalia
- Phylum: Arthropoda
- Class: Insecta
- Order: Coleoptera
- Suborder: Polyphaga
- Infraorder: Cucujiformia
- Family: Cerambycidae
- Genus: Abatocera

= Abatocera =

Genus of beetles

Abatocera is a genus of beetles in the family Cerambycidae and encompasses the following species:

subgenus Abatocera

- Abatocera arnaudi Rigout, 1987
- Abatocera irregularis Vollenhoven, 1871
- Abatocera leonina (Thomson, 1865)

subgenus Sternobatocera

- Abatocera keyensis Breuning, 1943
- Abatocera subirregularis Breuning, 1954
