= Aprionella =

Scientific classification
- Kingdom: Animalia
- Phylum: Arthropoda
- Class: Insecta
- Order: Coleoptera
- Suborder: Polyphaga
- Infraorder: Cucujiformia
- Family: Cerambycidae
- Genus: Aprionella
- Species: A. unicolor

Binomial name
- Aprionella unicolor Gilmour, 1959

Genus of beetles

Aprionella unicolor is a species of beetle in the family Cerambycidae, and the only species in the genus Aprionella. It was described by Gilmour in 1959.
