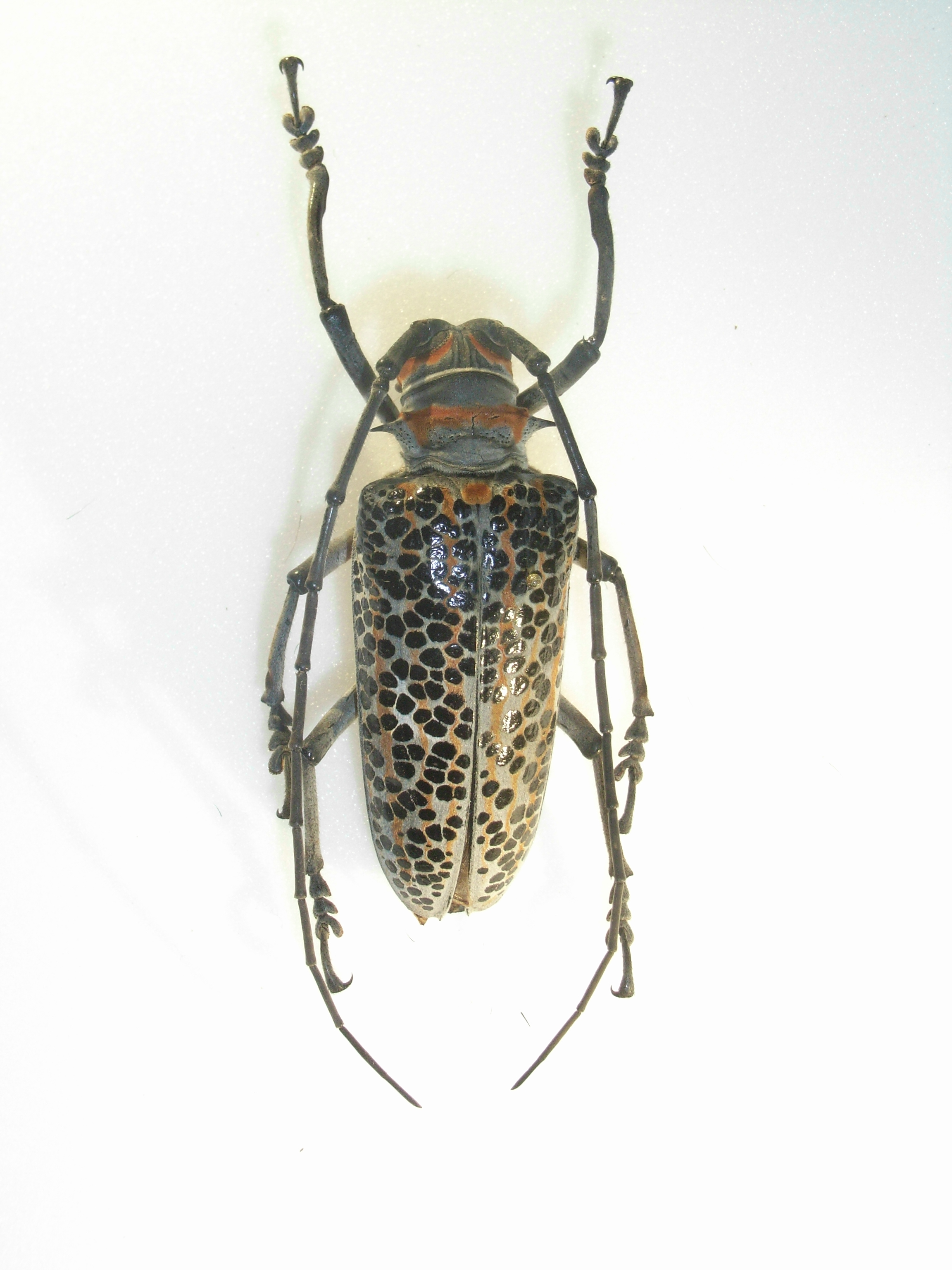

Scientific classification
- Domain: Eukaryota
- Kingdom: Animalia
- Phylum: Arthropoda
- Class: Insecta
- Order: Coleoptera
- Suborder: Polyphaga
- Infraorder: Cucujiformia
- Family: Cerambycidae
- Genus: Rosenbergia
- Species: R. straussi

Binomial name
- Rosenbergia straussi (Gestro, 1876)

Synonyms
- Apriona straussi Gestro, 1876; Rosenbergia lislei Rigout, 1981; Rosenbergia lislei var. noeli Rigout, 1982

= Rosenbergia straussi =

Species of beetle

Rosenbergia straussi is a species of beetle in the family Cerambycidae. It was described by Gestro in 1876.
