= Ring species =

Connected series of neighbouring populations

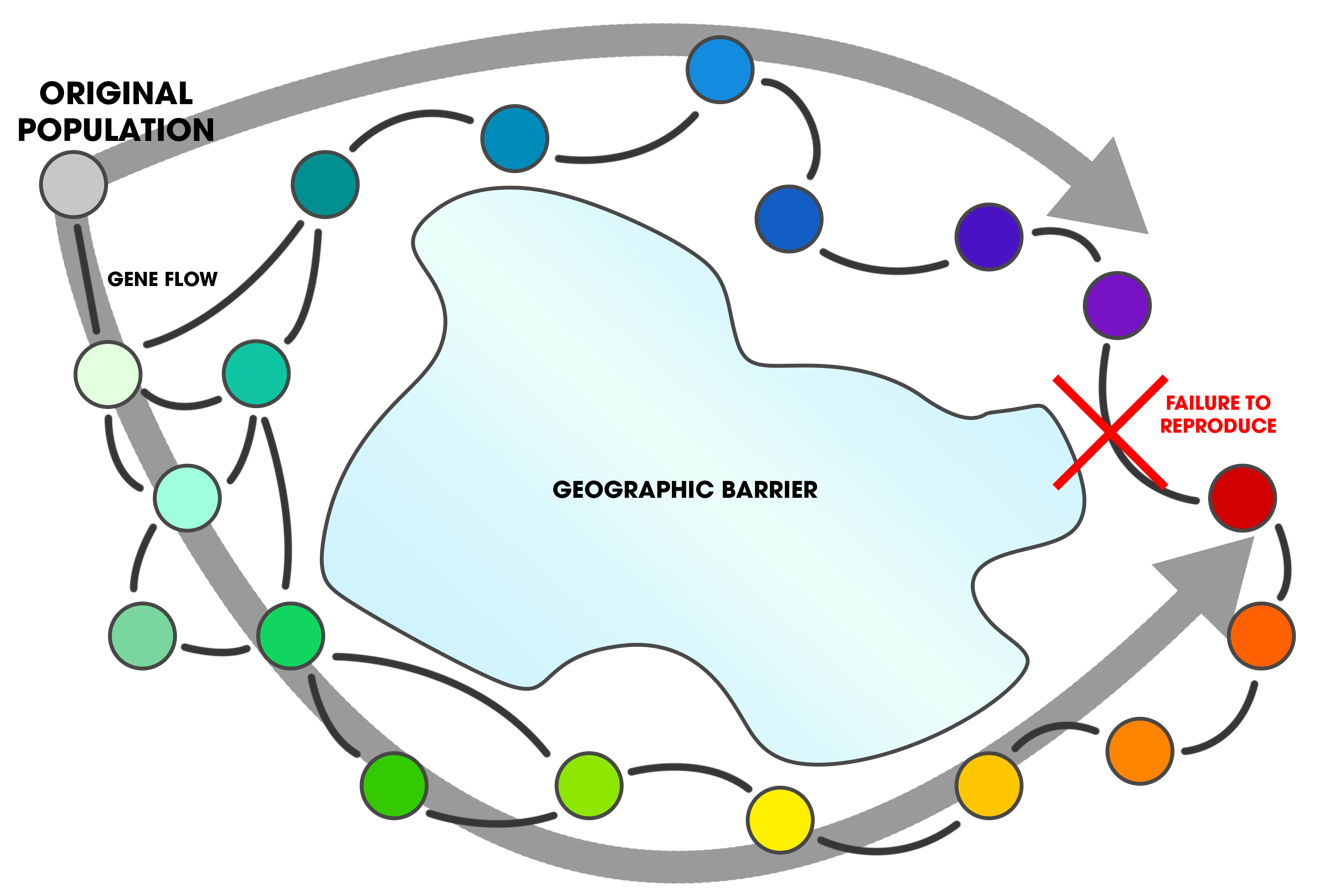
In a ring species, gene flow occurs between neighbouring populations of a species, but at the ends of the ring the populations don't interbreed.

The coloured bars show natural populations (colours), varying along a cline. Such variation may occur in a line (e.g. up a mountain slope) as in A, or may wrap around as in B. Where the cline bends around, populations next to each other on the cline can interbreed, but at the point at which the beginning meets the end again, as at C, the differences along the cline prevent interbreeding (gap between pink and green). The interbreeding populations are then called a ring species.

In biology, a ring species is a connected series of neighbouring populations, each of which interbreeds with closely sited related populations, but for which there exist at least two end populations in the series which are too distantly related to interbreed, though there is a potential gene flow between linked neighbouring populations. Such non-breeding, though genetically connected, end populations may co-exist in the same region (sympatry) thus closing a ring. The German term Rassenkreis, meaning "circle of races", is also used.

Ring species represent speciation and have been cited as evidence of evolution. They illustrate what happens over time as populations genetically diverge, specifically because they represent, in living populations, what normally happens over time between long-deceased ancestor populations and living populations, in which the intermediates have become extinct. The evolutionary biologist Richard Dawkins remarks that ring species "are only showing us in the spatial dimension something that must always happen in the time dimension".

Formally, the issue is that interfertility (ability to interbreed) is not a transitive relation; if A breeds with B, and B breeds with C, it does not mean that A breeds with C, and therefore does not define an equivalence relation. A ring species is a species with a counterexample to the transitivity of interbreeding. However, it is unclear whether any of the examples of ring species cited by scientists actually permit gene flow from end to end, with many being debated and contested.

== History ==
The Larus gulls interbreed in a ring around the arctic. 1: L. fuscus, 2: Siberian population of L. fuscus, 3: L. heuglini, 4: L. vegae birulai, 5: L. vegae, 6: L. smithsonianus, 7: L. argentatus

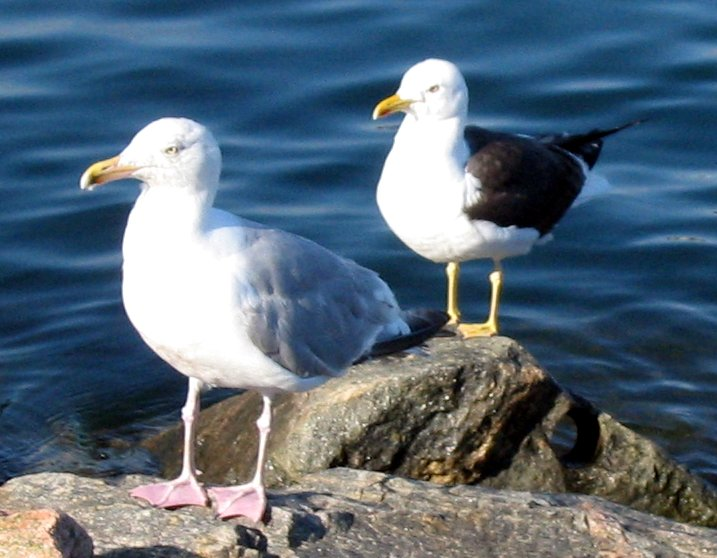
Herring gull (Larus argentatus) (front) and lesser black-backed gull (Larus fuscus) (behind) in Norway: two phenotypes with clear differences

The classic ring species is the Larus gull. In 1925 Jonathan Dwight found the genus to form a chain of varieties around the Arctic Circle. However, doubts have arisen as to whether this represents an actual ring species. In 1938, Claud Buchanan Ticehurst argued that the greenish warbler had spread from Nepal around the Tibetan Plateau, while adapting to each new environment, meeting again in Siberia where the ends no longer interbreed. These and other discoveries led Mayr to first formulate a theory on ring species in his 1942 study Systematics and the Origin of Species. Also in the 1940s, Robert C. Stebbins described the Ensatina salamanders around the Californian Central Valley as a ring species; but again, some authors such as Jerry Coyne consider this classification incorrect. Finally in 2012, the first example of a ring species in plants was found in a spurge, forming a ring around the Caribbean Sea.

== Speciation ==
The evolutionary biologist Ernst Mayr championed the concept of ring species, stating that it unequivocally demonstrated the process of speciation. A ring species is an alternative model to allopatric speciation, "illustrating how new species can arise through 'circular overlap', without interruption of gene flow through intervening populations…" However, Jerry Coyne and H. Allen Orr point out that rings species more closely model parapatric speciation.

Ring species often attract the interests of evolutionary biologists, systematists, and researchers of speciation leading to both thought provoking ideas and confusion concerning their definition. Contemporary scholars recognize that examples in nature have proved rare due to various factors such as limitations in taxonomic delineation or, "taxonomic zeal"—explained by the fact that taxonomists classify organisms into "species", while ring species often cannot fit this definition. Other reasons such as gene flow interruption from "vicariate divergence" and fragmented populations due to climate instability have also been cited.

Ring species also present an interesting case of the species problem for those seeking to divide the living world into discrete species. All that distinguishes a ring species from two separate species is the existence of the connecting populations; if enough of the connecting populations within the ring perish to sever the breeding connection then the ring species' distal populations will be recognized as two distinct species. The problem is whether to quantify the whole ring as a single species (despite the fact that not all individuals interbreed) or to classify each population as a distinct species (despite the fact that it interbreeds with its near neighbours). Ring species illustrate that species boundaries arise gradually and often exist on a continuum.

== Examples ==
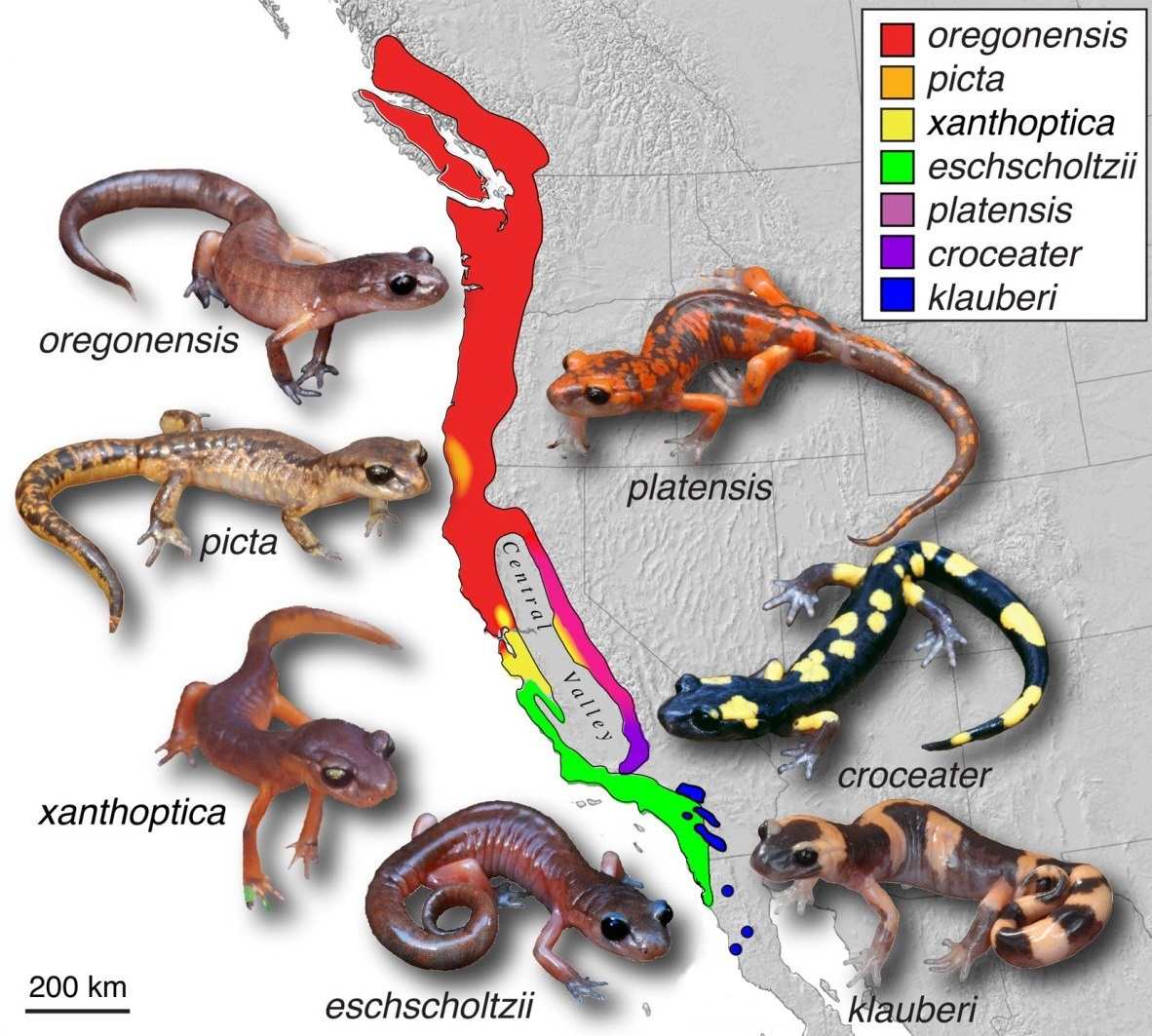
Ensatina salamanders, an example of a ring species

Speculated evolution and spread of the greenish warbler, Phylloscopus trochiloides: P. t. trochiloides P. t. obscuratus P. t. plumbeitarsus P. t. ludlowi P. t. viridanus Note: The P. t. nitidus in Caucasus Mountains not shown.

Many examples have been documented in nature. Debate exists concerning much of the research, with some authors citing evidence against their existence entirely. The following examples provide evidence that—despite the limited number of concrete, idealized examples in nature—continuums of species do exist and can be found in biological systems. This is often characterized by sub-species level classifications such as clines, ecotypes, complexes, and varieties. Many examples have been disputed by researchers, and equally "many of the [proposed] cases have received very little attention from researchers, making it difficult to assess whether they display the characteristics of ideal ring species."

The following list gives examples of ring species found in nature. Some of the examples such as the Larus gull complex, the greenish warbler of Asia, and the Ensatina salamanders of America, have been disputed.

- Acanthiza pusilla and A. ewingii
- Acacia karroo
- Alauda skylarks (Alauda arvensis, A. japonica and A. gulgula)
- Alophoixus
- Aulostomus (trumpetfish)
- Camarhynchus psittacula and C. pauper
- Chaerephon pumilus species complex
- Ensatina salamanders
- Euphorbia tithymaloides is a group within the spurge family that has reproduced and evolved in a ring through Central America and the Caribbean, meeting in the Virgin Islands where they appear to be morphologically and ecologically distinct.
- Great tit (however, some studies dispute this example)
- The greenish warbler (Phylloscopus trochiloides) forms a species ring, around the Himalayas. It is thought to have spread from Nepal around the inhospitable Tibetan Plateau, to rejoin in Siberia, where the plumbeitarsus and the viridanus appeared to no longer mutually reproduce.
- Hoplitis producta
- House mouse
- Junonia coenia and J. genoveva/J. evarete
- Lalage leucopygialis, L. nigra, and L. sueurii
- Larus gulls form a circumpolar "ring" around the North Pole. The European herring gull (L. argentatus argenteus), which lives primarily in Great Britain and Ireland, can hybridize with the American herring gull (L. smithsonianus), (living in North America), which can also hybridize with the Vega or East Siberian herring gull (L. vegae), the western subspecies of which, Birula's gull (L. vegae birulai), can hybridize with Heuglin's gull (L. heuglini), which in turn can hybridize with the Siberian lesser black-backed gull (L. fuscus). All four of these live across the north of Siberia. The last is the eastern representative of the lesser black-backed gulls back in north-western Europe, including Great Britain. The lesser black-backed gulls and herring gulls are sufficiently different that they do not normally hybridize; thus the group of gulls forms a continuum except where the two lineages meet in Europe. However, a 2004 genetic study entitled "The herring gull complex is not a ring species" has shown that this example is far more complex than presented here (Liebers et al., 2004): this example only speaks to the complex of species from the classical herring gull through lesser black-backed gull. There are several other taxonomically unclear examples that belong in the same species complex, such as yellow-legged gull (L. michahellis), glaucous gull (L. hyperboreus), and Caspian gull (L. cachinnans).
- Pelophylax nigromaculatus and P. porosus/P. porosus brevipodus (The names and classification of these species have changed since the publication suggesting a ring species.)
- Pernis ptilorhynchus and P. celebensis
- Perognathus amplus and P. longimembris
- Peromyscus maniculatus
- Phellinus
- Platycercus elegans (Crimson rosella) complex
- Drosophila paulistorum
- Phylloscopus collybita and P. sindianus
- Phylloscopus (Willow warblers)
- Powelliphanta
- Rhymogona silvatica and R. cervina (the names and classification of these species have changed since the publication suggesting a ring species)
- Melospiza melodia, a song sparrow, forms a ring around the Sierra Nevada of California with the subspecies heermanni and fallax meeting in the vicinity of the San Gorgonio Pass.
- Todiramphus chloris and T. cinnamominus

== See also ==
- Dialect continuum, a similar concept in linguistics
- Intergradation
