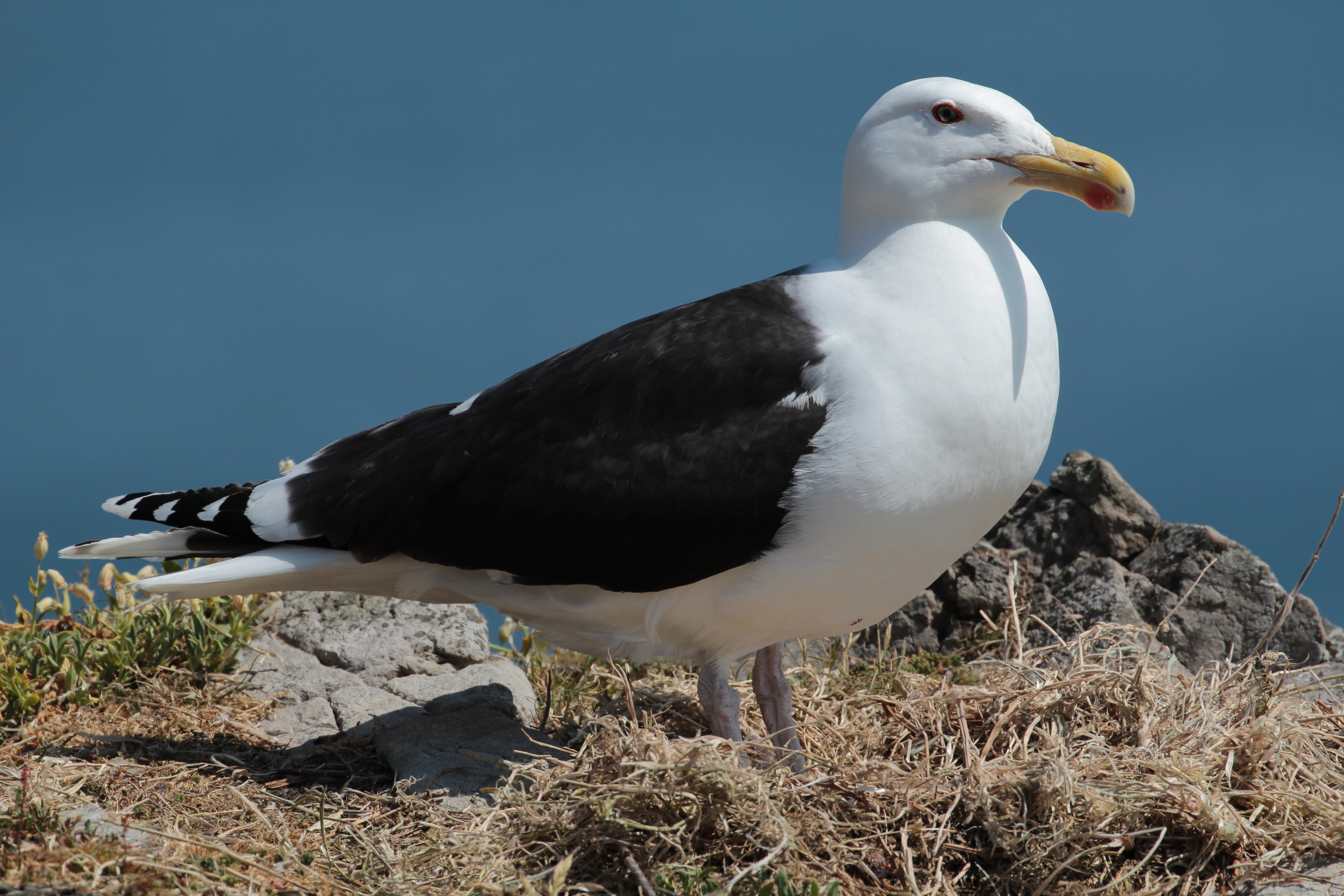
- Great black-backed gull Larus marinus

Scientific classification
- Kingdom: Animalia
- Phylum: Chordata
- Class: Aves
- Order: Charadriiformes
- Family: Laridae
- Subfamily: Larinae
- Genus: Larus; Linnaeus, 1758

Type species
- Larus marinus Linnaeus, 1758

Species
- See list

Audio
- Larus marinus

= Larus =

Genus of birds

Larus is a large genus of gulls with worldwide distribution (by far the greatest species diversity is in the Northern Hemisphere).

Many of its species are abundant and well-known birds in their ranges. Until about 2005–2007, most gulls were placed in this genus, but this arrangement is now known to be polyphyletic, leading to the resurrection of the genera Chroicocephalus, Ichthyaetus, Hydrocoloeus, and Leucophaeus for many other species formerly included in Larus.

They are in general medium-large birds, typically pale grey to black above and white below and on the head, often with black markings with white spots ("mirrors") on their wingtips and in a few species also some black on the tail. They have stout, longish bills and webbed feet; in winter, the head is often streaked or smudged dark grey. The young birds are brown, and take three to five years to reach adult plumage, with subadult plumages intermediate between the young and adult.

The taxonomy of the large gulls in the herring and lesser black-backed complex is complicated, with different authorities recognising from two species in the past, increasingly up to eight species more recently.

== Taxonomy ==
The genus Larus was introduced in 1758 by the Swedish naturalist Carl Linnaeus in the tenth edition of his Systema Naturae. The genus name is from Ancient Greek laros (λάῥος) or Latin larus, which appears to have referred to a gull or other large seabird.

The type species is the great black-backed gull (Larus marinus). The Latin name Larus marinus translates as "sea gull", and the gulls in this genus generally are the species most often known colloquially as "seagulls".

=== Species ===
The genus contains 25 extant species.

Genus Larus – Linnaeus, 1758 – twenty five species
| Common name | Scientific name and subspecies | Range | Size and ecology | IUCN status and estimated population |
|---|---|---|---|---|
| Pacific gull | Larus pacificus Latham, 1801 Two subspecies: L. p. pacificus Latham, 1801; L. p. georgis King, 1826 | Australia. | Size: Habitat: Diet: | LC |
| Belcher's gull or band-tailed gull | Larus belcheri Vigors, 1829 | the Pacific coast of South America. | Size: Habitat: Diet: | LC |
| Black-tailed gull | Larus crassirostris Vieillot, 1818 | coasts of the East China Sea, Japan, Manchuria and the Kuril Islands, to western Alaska in North America. | Size: Habitat: Diet: | LC |
| Olrog's gull | Larus atlanticus Olrog, 1958 | Atlantic coast of southern Brazil, Uruguay, and northern Argentina. | Size: Habitat: Diet: | NT |
| Heermann's gull | Larus heermanni Cassin, 1852 | Pacific coast of the United States, Mexico and extreme southwestern British Columbia. | Size: Habitat: Diet: | NT |
| Common gull | Larus canus Linnaeus, 1758 Three subspecies: L. c. canus – Linnaeus, 1758; L. c. heinei – Homeyer, 1853; L. c. kamtschatschensis – Bonaparte, 1857 | northern Palearctic (northern Europe, northern Asia), wintering south to the Mediterranean and China. | Size: Habitat: Diet: | LC |
| Short-billed gull or mew gull | Larus brachyrhynchus Richardson, 1831 | northwestern North America. | Size: Habitat: Diet: | LC |
| Ring-billed gull | Larus delawarensis Ord, 1815 | Canada and the northern United States, wintering south to the Caribbean. | Size: Habitat: Diet: | LC |
| Yellow-footed gull | Larus livens Dwight, 1919 | Gulf of California in Mexico. | Size: Habitat: Diet: | LC |
| Western gull | Larus occidentalis Audubon, 1839 | from British Columbia, Canada to Baja California, Mexico. | Size: Habitat: Diet: | LC |
| Caspian gull | Larus cachinnans Pallas, 1811 | Black and Caspian Seas and adjacent river basins, extending east into Central Asia; wintering west into Europe and south to the coasts of Arabia. | Size: Habitat: Diet: | LC |
| Kelp gull (called southern black-backed gull or karoro in New Zealand) | Larus dominicanus Lichtenstein, MHC, 1823 Five subspecies: L. d. dominicanus, Lichtenstein, 1823; L. d. vetula, (Bruch, 1853); L. d. judithae, (Jiguet, 2002); L. d. melisandae, (Jiguet, 2002); L. d. austrinus, (Fleming, 1924) | Antarctic Peninsula, southern South America, southern Africa, Southern Ocean Islands, southeastern Australia, and New Zealand. | Size: Habitat: Diet: | LC |
| European herring gull | Larus argentatus Pontoppidan, 1763 Two subspecies: L. a. argentatus – Pontoppidan, 1763; L. a. argenteus – Brehm & Schilling, 1822 | northern and northwestern Europe. | Size: Habitat: Diet: | LC |
| Vega gull (or East Siberian gull) | Larus vegae Palmén, 1887 | northeastern Siberia, wintering in Japan, Korea, southern and eastern China, and Taiwan. | Size: Habitat: Diet: | LC |
| Mongolian gull | Larus mongolicus Sushkin, 1925 | Mongolia and southeastern Russia, wintering in Japan, Korea, southern and eastern China, and Taiwan. | Size: Habitat: Diet: | LC |
| Yellow-legged gull | Larus michahellis Naumann, 1840 Two subspecies: L. m. michahellis Naumann, 1840; L. m. atlantis (Dwight, 1922), syn. Larus fuscus atlantis, Dwight, 1922 | Mediterranean Sea and Macaronesia, dispersing north as far as the British Isles after breeding. | Size: Habitat: Diet: | LC |
| Armenian gull | Larus armenicus Buturlin, 1934 | interior Turkey, the Caucasus and the Middle East, wintering in the eastern Mediterranean and the Persian Gulf. | Size: Habitat: Diet: | LC |
| Great black-backed gull | Larus marinus Linnaeus, 1758 | northwest European coasts, northeast North American coasts, and islands of the North Atlantic. | Size: Habitat: Diet: | LC |
| Glaucous gull | Larus hyperboreus Gunnerus, 1767 Four subspecies: L. h. hyperboreus, Gunnerus, 1767; L. h. pallidissimus, Portenko, 1939; L. h. barrovianus, Ridgway, 1886; L. h. leuceretes, Schleep, 1819 | Arctic Ocean coasts, wintering in the North Atlantic and North Pacific as far south as the British Isles and northernmost states of the United States, also on the Great Lakes. | Size: Habitat: Diet: | LC |
| Lesser black-backed gull | Larus fuscus Linnaeus, 1758 Five subspecies: L. f. graellsii Brehm, 1857; L. f. intermedius Schiøler, 1922; L. f. fuscus Linnaeus, 1758; L. f. heuglini Bree, 1876; L. f. barabensis Johansen, 1960 | Atlantic coasts of Europe and northwest Asia, wintering south to central Africa and India. | Size: Habitat: Diet: | LC |
| California gull | Larus californicus Lawrence, 1854 Two subspecies: L. c. californicus Lawrence, 1854; L. c. albertaensis Jehl, 1987 | western interior North America from the Northwest Territories, Canada south to eastern California and Colorado, wintering south to western Mexico. | Size: Habitat: Diet: | LC |
| American herring gull | Larus smithsonianus Coues, 1862 | North America from central and southern Alaska to the Great Lakes and northeast coast of the United States from Maine south to North Carolina, wintering south to the Caribbean. | Size: Habitat: Diet: | LC |
| Glaucous-winged gull | Larus glaucescens Naumann, 1840 | Pacific Ocean coasts of Russia and Alaska to the coast of Washington, wintering south to Japan and northwest Mexico. | Size: Habitat: Diet: | LC |
| Slaty-backed gull | Larus schistisagus Stejneger, 1884 | northeastern coasts of Asia, wintering south to eastern China. | Size: Habitat: Diet: | LC |
| Iceland gull | Larus glaucoides Meyer, B, 1822 Three subspecies: L. g. glaucoides Meyer, 1822; L. g. kumlieni Brewster, 1883; L. g. thayeri Brooks, WS, 1915 | Arctic Ocean coasts of Canada and Greenland, wintering from Iceland south to the British Isles and the far northeast USA, with subspecies thayeri wintering on the Pacific coast of North America. | Size: Habitat: Diet: | LC |

==== Fossils ====
Fossils of Larus gulls are known from the Middle Miocene, about 20-15 million years ago; allocation of earlier fossils to this genus is generally rejected. Biogeography of the fossil record suggests that the genus evolved in the northern Atlantic and spread globally during the Pliocene, when species diversity seems to have been highest, as with most seabirds.

- Larus sp. (Middle Miocene of Grund, Austria)
- Larus sp. (Middle Miocene of Romania)
- Larus sp. (Late? Miocene/Early Pliocene of Lee Creek Mine, U.S.) - several species
- Larus elmorei (Middle Pliocene of Bone Valley, southeastern U.S.)
- Larus lacus (Late Pliocene of Pinecrest, southeastern U.S.)
- Larus perpetuus (Pliocene of southeastern U.S.)
- Larus sp. (San Diego Late Pliocene of the southwestern U.S.)
- Larus oregonus (Late Pliocene - Late Pleistocene of the west-central U.S.)
- Larus robustus (Late Pliocene - Late Pleistocene of the west-central U.S.)
- Larus sp. (Late Pleistocene of Lake Manix western U.S.)

"Larus" raemdonckii (Early Oligocene of Belgium) is now at least tentatively believed to belong in the procellariiform genus Puffinus. "L." elegans (Late Oligocene?/Early Miocene of St-Gérand-le-Puy, France) and "L." totanoides (Late Oligocene?/Early Miocene of southeastern France) are now in Laricola, while "L." dolnicensis (Early Miocene of the Czech Republic) was actually a pratincole; it is now placed in Mioglareola.

The Early Miocene "Larus" desnoyersii (southeastern France) and "L." pristinus (John Day Formation, Willow Creek, U.S.) probably do not belong in this genus; the former may be a skua.

== Ring species ==
The Larus gulls formerly interpreted as a ring around the Arctic: 1. L. fuscus graellsii & L. f. intermedius (Western European lesser black-backed gulls); 2. L. fuscus fuscus (North East European lesser black-backed gull); 3. L. fuscus heuglini (Heuglin's gull); 4. L. vegae birulai (Birula's gull); 5. L. vegae sensu stricto (Vega gull); 6. L. smithsonianus (American herring gull); 7. L. argentatus (European herring gull)

The circumpolar group of Larus gull species has often been cited as a classic example of the ring species. The range of these gulls forms a ring around the North Pole. The European herring gull, which lives primarily in Great Britain and Northern Europe, can hybridize with the American herring gull (living in North America), which can also interbreed with the Vega or East Siberian gull, the western subspecies of which, Birula's gull, can hybridize with Heuglin's gull which, in turn, can interbreed with the Siberian lesser black-backed gull (all four of these live across the north of Siberia). The last is the eastern representative of the lesser black-backed gulls back in northwestern Europe, including Great Britain. However, the lesser black-backed gulls and herring gull are sufficiently different that they rarely interbreed; thus, the group of gulls forms a continuum except in Europe, where the two lineages meet. However, a recent genetic study has shown that this example is far more complicated than presented here, and probably does not constitute a true ring species.

== See also ==
- Hybridisation in gulls
- Gull eggs
