= Larus lacus =

†Larus lacus Temporal range: Pliocene

Scientific classification
- Kingdom: Animalia
- Phylum: Chordata
- Class: Aves
- Order: Charadriiformes
- Family: Laridae
- Genus: Larus
- Species: †L. lacus

Binomial name
- †Larus lacus Emslie, 1995

Extinct species of gull

Larus lacus is an extinct species of gull that lived in North America during the Late Pliocene.

== Etymology ==
The genus name Larus derives from Ancient Greek, referring to a seabird. The species name lacus derives from Latin, meaning "lake or standing body of water, in reference to the lagoonal deposits at the type locality."

== Description ==
Larus lacus specimens stem from Sarasota County, Florida. The humerus of Larus lacus most closely resembles the Hartlaub's gull (Chroicocephalus hartlaubii), black-headed gull (Chroicocephalus ridibundus), brown-hooded gull (Chroicocephalus maculipennis), and Franklin's gull (Leucophaeus pipixcan).
