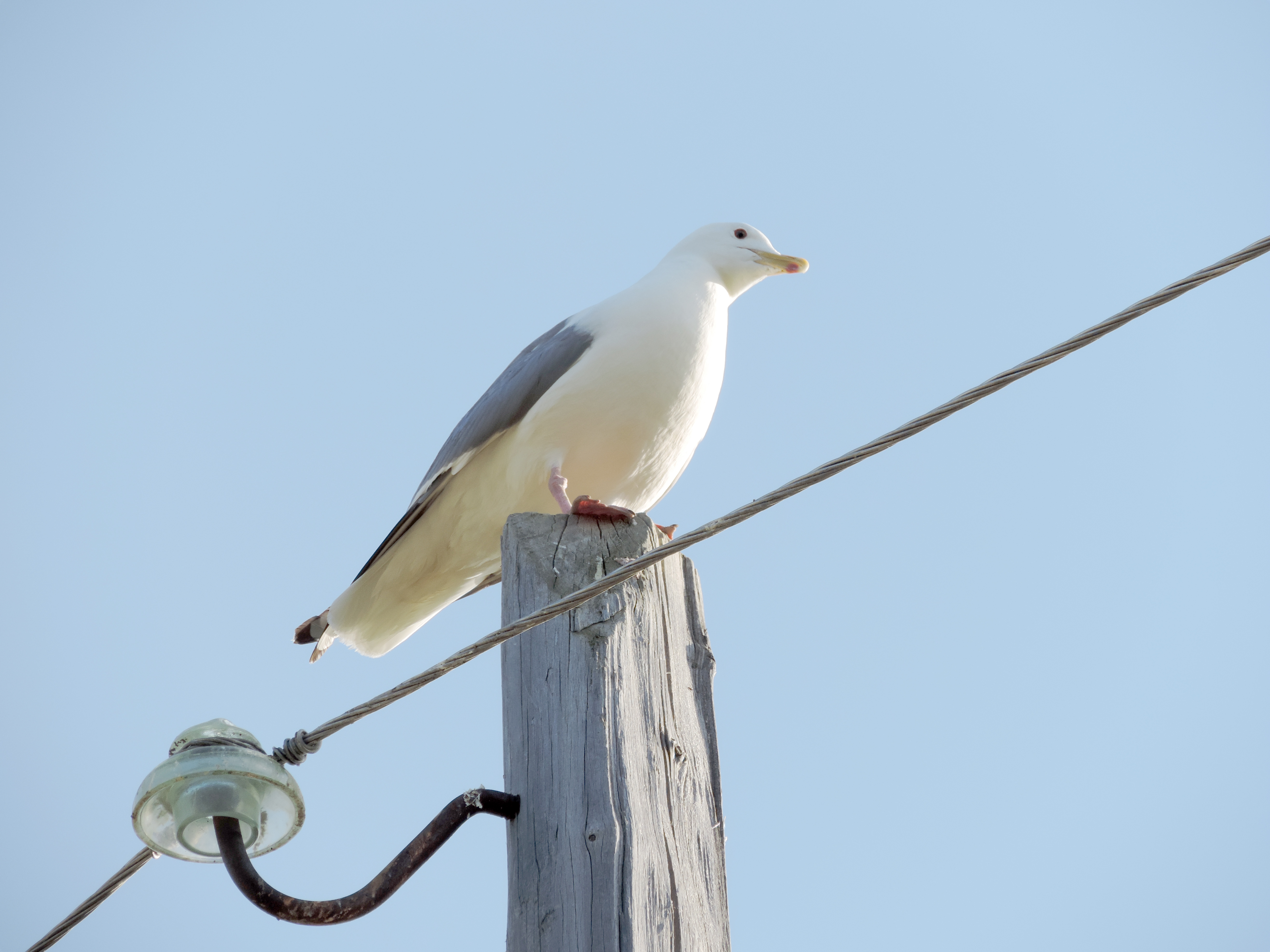
- Vega gull in Chukotka Autonomous Okrug, northeastern Siberia

Scientific classification
- Kingdom: Animalia
- Phylum: Chordata
- Class: Aves
- Order: Charadriiformes
- Family: Laridae
- Genus: Larus
- Species: L. vegae

Binomial name
- Larus vegae Palmén, 1887

Synonyms
- Larus argentatus vegae Larus heuglini vegae

= Vega gull =

Species of bird

The Vega gull, East Siberian gull, or East Siberian herring gull (Larus vegae) is a large gull of the herring gull/lesser black-backed gull complex which breeds in Northeast Asia. Its classification is still controversial and uncertain. It is variously treated as a separate species, as a subspecies of the American herring gull (L. smithsonianus) or included with both the American herring gull and European herring gull in L. argentatus. The Mongolian gull Larus mongolicus was formerly regarded as a subspecies of Vega gull. It was described in 1887 from specimens collected on the 1878–1880 Vega Expedition on the Swedish ship SS Vega.

== Description ==
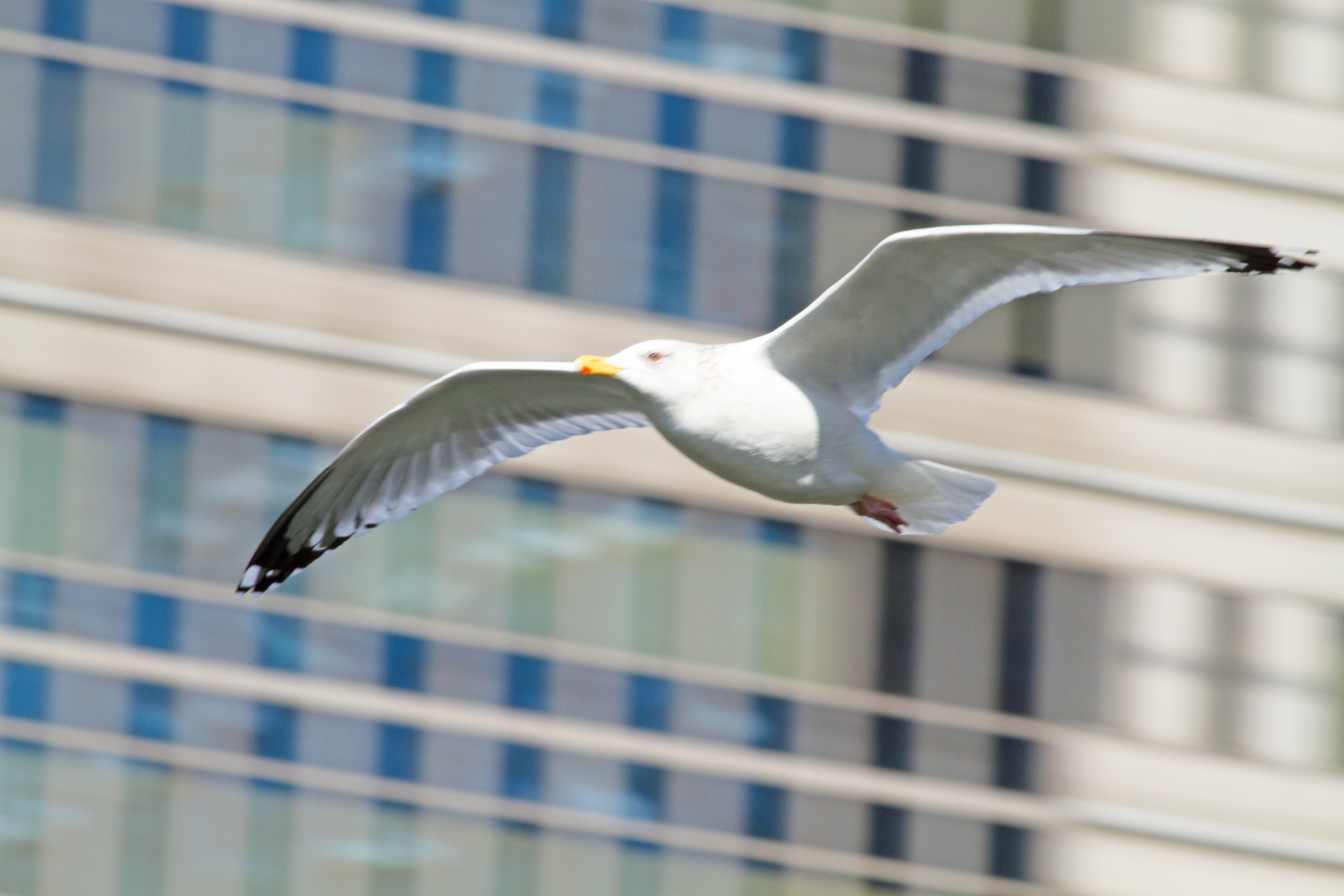
Adult Vega gull in flight in winter, Tokyo

The Vega gull is similar to the herring gull but is slightly darker grey above. The head of the Vega gull is heavily streaked with brown in winter, especially on the back and sides of the neck forming a collar. The legs are usually bright pink. First- and second-winter Vega gulls are darker than the similar Mongolian gull, notably on the crown of the head where Mongolian gulls even in first- and second-winter are a bit paler. Almost the full body of first- and second-winter Vega gulls displays darker brown flecks and streaks. Adult Vega gulls in winter can often be mistaken for the very similar-looking slaty-backed gull (L. schistisagus) and the western gull (L. occidentalis), but the Vega gull's grey is lighter than the two similar species. Eye colour is variable but tends to be dark with a red orbital ring. The bill is yellow with a red spot except for first- and second-winter gulls where the bill can be almost entirely dark grey to black, with the grey portion shrinking until it reaches maturity.

Vega gulls in the northwestern part of their breeding range are paler above. They are sometimes considered to be a separate subspecies named Birula's gull (Larus vegae birulai).

== Distribution and habitat ==
Vega gulls breed in northeastern Siberia, and migrate south to winter in Japan, Korea, eastern China, and Taiwan. They are regularly seen on St. Lawrence Island and Nome, Alaska and may breed there. There are also records from other parts of western Alaska, and a few photo documented records from Washington and California. In their winter range they are typically found in harbours, on rocky shores and at river mouths.

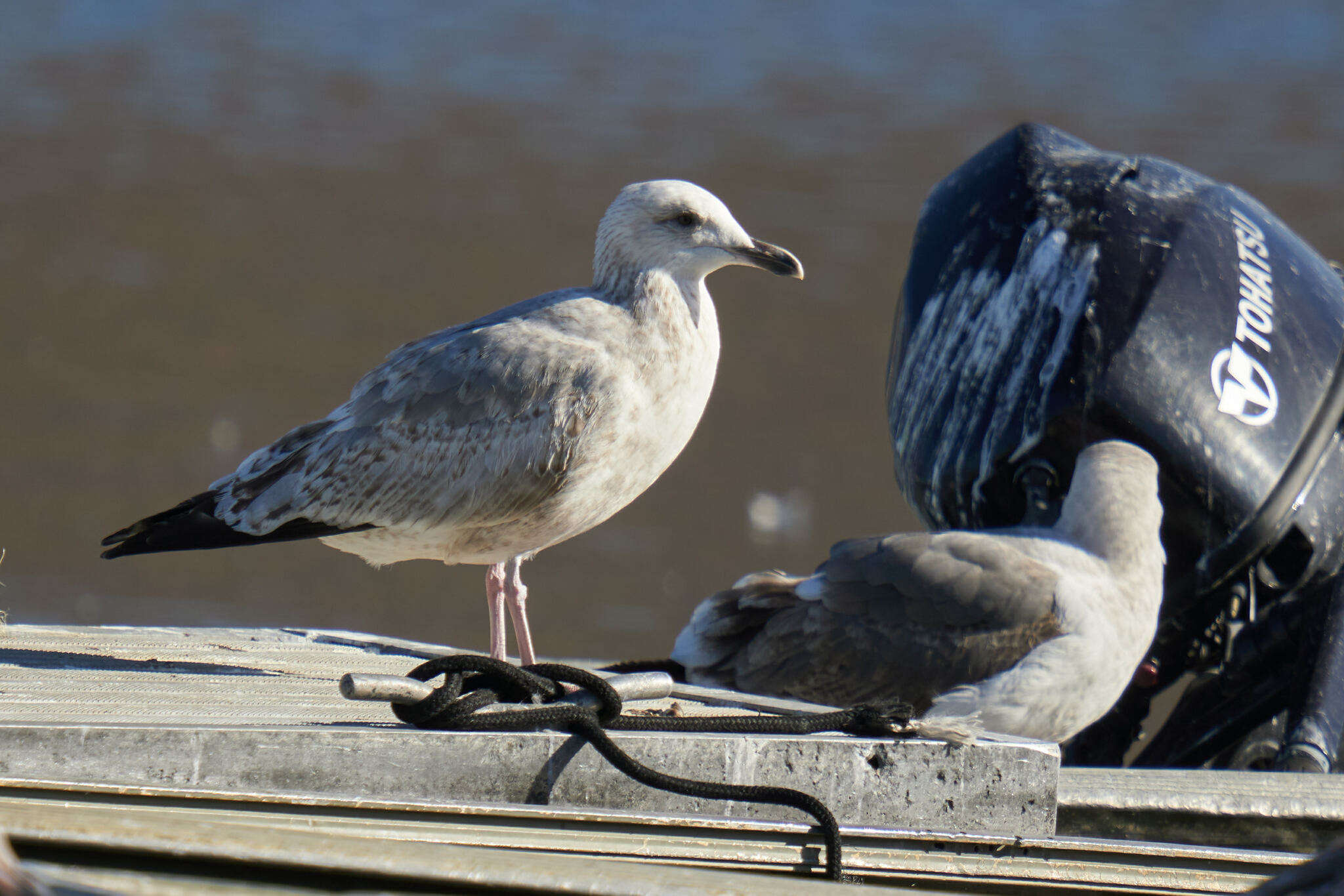
2nd-winter Vega Gull overwintering in San Diego, California
