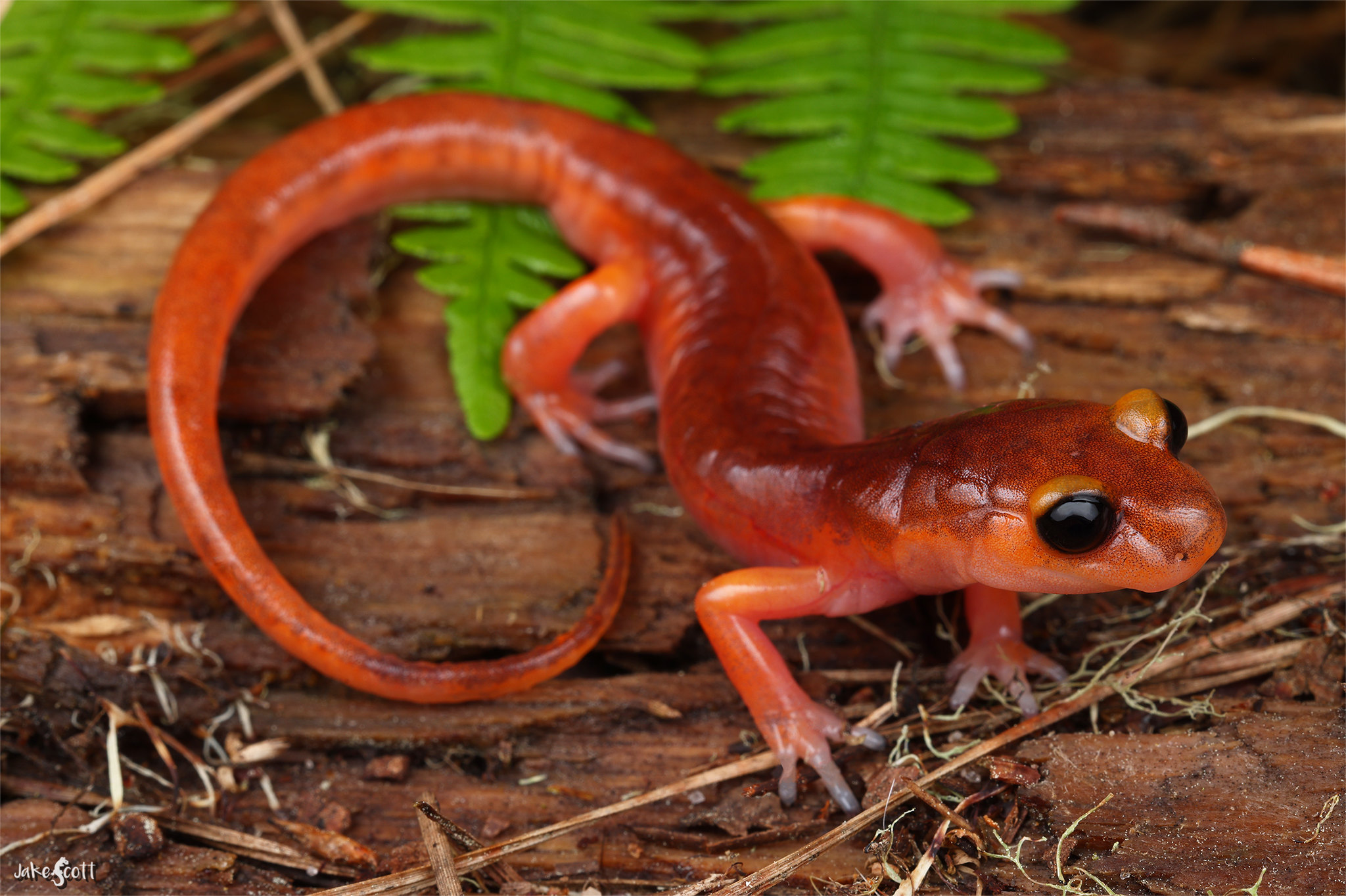
- Monterey Ensatina (Ensatina eschscholtzii eschscholtzii)

Conservation status
- Least Concern (IUCN 3.1)

Scientific classification
- Kingdom: Animalia
- Phylum: Chordata
- Class: Amphibia
- Order: Urodela
- Family: Plethodontidae
- Subfamily: Plethodontinae
- Genus: Ensatina; Gray, 1850
- Species: E. eschscholtzii

Binomial name
- Ensatina eschscholtzii Gray, 1850

Synonyms
- Ensatina klauberi; Heredia oregonensis; Plethodon croceater; Urotropis platensis

= Ensatina =

Species of salamanders

The ensatina (Ensatina eschscholtzii) is a species complex of plethodontid (lungless) salamanders found in coniferous forests, oak woodland and chaparral from British Columbia, through Washington, Oregon, across California (where all seven subspecies variations are located), all the way down to Baja California in Mexico. The genus Ensatina originated approximately 21.5 million years ago. It is usually considered as monospecific, being represented by a single species, Ensatina eschscholtzii, with several subspecies forming a ring species.

== Description ==
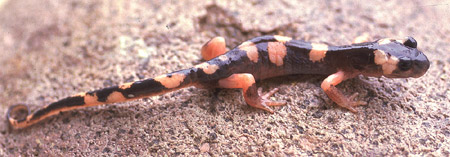
Ensatina eschscholtzii klauberi, the large-blotched ensatina

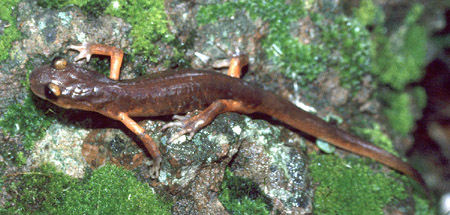
E. eschscholtzii eschscholtzi, the Monterey ensatina

The subspecies Ensatina e. eschscholtzii, the Monterey ensatina, can be found in Santa Cruz and Monterey Counties and into the California coastal mountains. With a head-to-tail length of just between 3–5 in (7.6–12.7 cm), E. e. eschecholtzi can be identified primarily by its tail, which is narrower at the base; it is the only subspecies that has such a tail structure, as well as five toes on the hind limbs.

Males often have longer tails than the females, and many of these salamanders have lighter-colored limbs, compared to the rest of the body. The adult females lay eggs underground, often in sets of threes, which hatch directly into fully-formed salamanders, skipping the usual aquatic juvenile phase.

The subspecies Ensatina eschscholtzii klauberi, or the large-blotched ensatina, can be found along the mountain ranges of Southern California, and south into a small region of the Sierra Juarez in northern Baja California.

E. e. klauberi is similar in size to E. e. eschscholtzii; it is mid-sized, with adults growIng a total length of 3–6 in (7.6–15.2 cm). Females tend to have shorter, wider bodies compared to the males. However, this subspecies differs from E. e. eschscholtzii in its coloration—nearly black, with blotches of orange, tail, and dark eyes.

=== As a ring species ===
Ensatina eschscholtzii has been described as a ring species in the mountains surrounding the Californian Central Valley. The complex population forms a horseshoe shape around the mountains, and although interbreeding can happen between each of the 19 populations around said horseshoe, the Ensatina eschscholtzii subspecies on the western end of the horseshoe cannot interbreed with the Ensatina klauberi on the eastern end. As such, it is thought to be an example of incipient speciation, providing an illustration of "nearly all stages in a speciation process" (Dobzhansky, 1958). Richard Highton, zoologist, argued that Ensatina is a genus of multiple species and not a continuum of one (meaning, by traditional definitions, it is not a ring species).

== Distribution and habitat ==
They are generally thought to be found in high elevations, from 520 to 2400m, in conifer forests and oak woodlands. However, populations were discovered along the coast in Volcán Riveroll, a volcanic area located in Baja California. It is thought that they are able to survive in this anomalous region due to the high moisture that comes in from the coast. It is unclear how these populations were able to end up in this coastal region, but it is hypothesized that "the subspecies was once more broadly distributed and became isolated as a result of climate change during the late Pleistocene and Holocene." If this is true, then it is estimated that Ensatina klauberi has been living in this region for thousands of years.

== Relationships with humans ==
Ensatina can usually be found under logs or brush, by or in streams and lakes, and in other moist places. They are easily distressed by improper handling, because they rely on cutaneous respiration, their thin skin is very sensitive to heating, drying and exposure to chemicals from warm hands. They may exude a sticky milky secretion from the tail.

== Diet ==
Ensatina are predators that hunt during wet weather or in wet environments for small invertebrates like spiders, mites, worms, crickets, etc. Similar to other Plethodontidae (lungless salamanders), Ensatinas shoot their tongues out to catch prey– similar to a frog.

== Reproduction and life cycle ==
Ensatina tend to breed and reproduce in the spring or fall depending on the environment and will lay batches of 3-25 eggs. However, this breeding only happens every other year. The location in which Ensatina lay their eggs can vary depending on their environment. Usually they like laying their eggs in moist environments on the forest floor; this can be under logs, in rotting stumps, under wet rocks, etc. Like many other amphibians Ensatina will guard their eggs for 3-5 months until they hatch.

When Ensatina are born they do not undergo a larval stage. The gills they use to survive as hatchlings are actually absorbed before hatching. After they are born, Ensatina will begin to hunt and reach sexual maturity after 3-4 years. Ensatina tend to live up to 15 years.

== Defensive behavior ==
Ensatina are not that big, growing up to half the length of a normal pencil. So when they feel threatened, they try to look bigger by raising their body up off the ground and elevating their tails. They also secrete a milky white substance on their tail and head that is actually poisonous.

More built into their appearance, Ensatina also are born with yellowish brown spots to help them camouflage into the brush and forest floor around them; another way of evading predators. Ensatina can also detach their tails like other salamanders to distract and escape predators.

== Subspecies ==
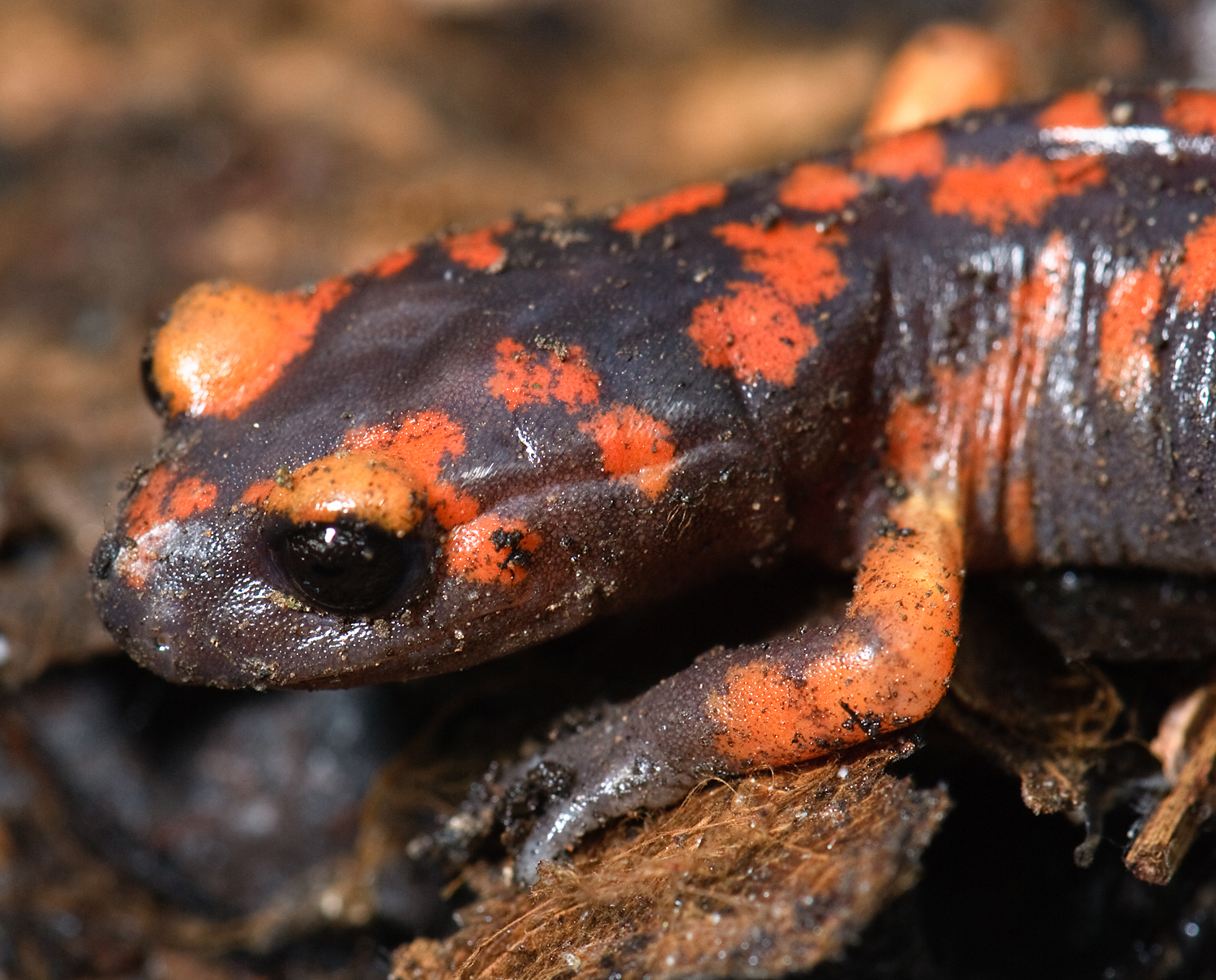
E. e. platensis from Fresno County, California

- Yellow-blotched ensatina — E. e. croceater (Cope, 1868)
- Monterey ensatina — E. e. eschscholtzii Gray, 1850
- Large-blotched ensatina — E. e. klauberi Dunn, 1929
- Oregon ensatina — E. e. oregonensis (Girard, 1856)
- Painted ensatina — E. e. picta Wood, 1940
- Sierra Nevada ensatina — E. e. platensis (Jiménez de la Espada, 1875)
- Yellow-eyed ensatina — E. e. xanthoptica Stebbins, 1949
