= Larus robustus =

†Larus robustus Temporal range: Pleistocene

Scientific classification
- Kingdom: Animalia
- Phylum: Chordata
- Class: Aves
- Order: Charadriiformes
- Family: Laridae
- Genus: Larus
- Species: †L. robustus

Binomial name
- †Larus robustus Shufeldt, 1891

Extinct species of gull

Larus robustus is an extinct species of gull that lived during the Late Pleistocene.

== Etymology ==
The genus name Larus derives from Ancient Greek, referring to a seabird. The species name robustus derives from Latin, meaning "hardness, strength."

== Description ==
Larus robustus specimens stem from Fossil Lake, Oregon. Charles H. Sternberg collected the type specimen. Larus robustus is large gull, smaller than the glaucous gull (Larus hyperboreus) and significantly larger than the American herring gull (Larus argentatus smithsonianus).
