= Larus perpetuus =

†Larus perpetuus Temporal range: Pliocene

Scientific classification
- Domain: Eukaryota
- Kingdom: Animalia
- Phylum: Chordata
- Class: Aves
- Order: Charadriiformes
- Family: Laridae
- Genus: Larus
- Species: †L. perpetuus

Binomial name
- †Larus perpetuus Emslie, 1995

Extinct species of gull

Larus perpetuus is an extinct species of gull that lived in North America during the Pliocene.

== Etymology ==
The genus name Larus derives from Ancient Greek, referring to a seabird. The species name perpetuus derives from Latin, meaning constant or forever, referencing the "long fossil history of this species."

== Description ==
Larus perpetuus specimens stem from Sarasota County, Florida (Late Pliocene), and Beaufort County, North Carolina (Early Pliocene). Its bone structure most closely resembles the black-tailed gull (Larus crassirostris), ring-billed gull (Larus delawarensis), and Audouin's gull (Ichthyaetus audouinii; formerly Larus audouinii).
