= Laricola =

Scientific classification
- Domain: Eukaryota
- Kingdom: Animalia
- Phylum: Chordata
- Class: Aves
- Order: Charadriiformes
- Family: †Laricolidae
- Genus: †Laricola; Mlíkovský, 2002

Type species
- Laricola elegans Milne-Edwards, 1868

Species
- See list

Genus of birds

Laricola is a genus of extinct gull-like birds that lived during the late Oligocene and early Miocene in what is now Europe.

== Taxonomy ==
Mlíkovský described the genus Laricola in 2002. Milne-Edwards (1863–1868) had previously classified three of the genus' members (Laricola elegans, L. totanoides, and L. desnoyersii) as Larus. The type species is Laricola elegans (Milne-Edwards, 1868). Laricola have "proportionally longer and more slender legs" than extant species of the family Laromorphae.

Laricola fossils stem from France, and allegedly the Czech Republic.

== Species ==
The genus contains five species.

Laricola elegans (Milne-Edwards, 1868)

Laricola totanoides (Milne-Edwards, 1868)

Laricola desnoyersii (Milne-Edwards, 1863)

Laricola intermedia (De Pietri et al., 2014)

Laricola robusta (De Pietri et al., 2014)
