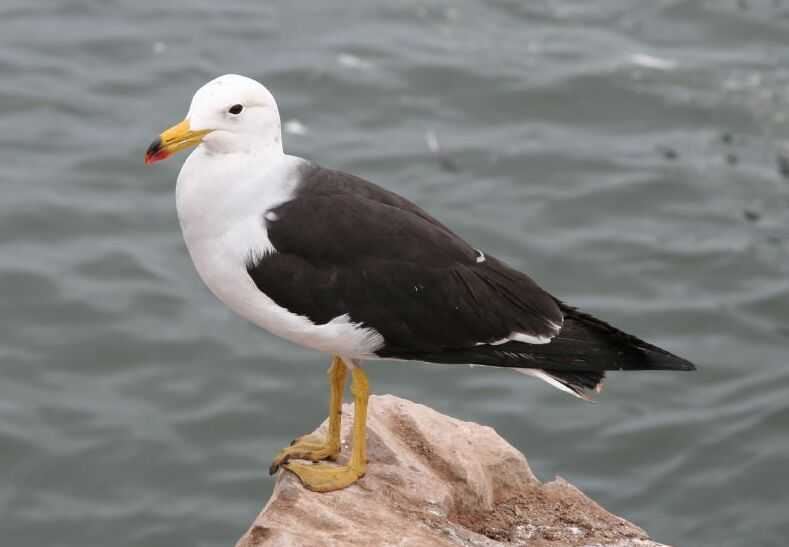
- Breeding adult
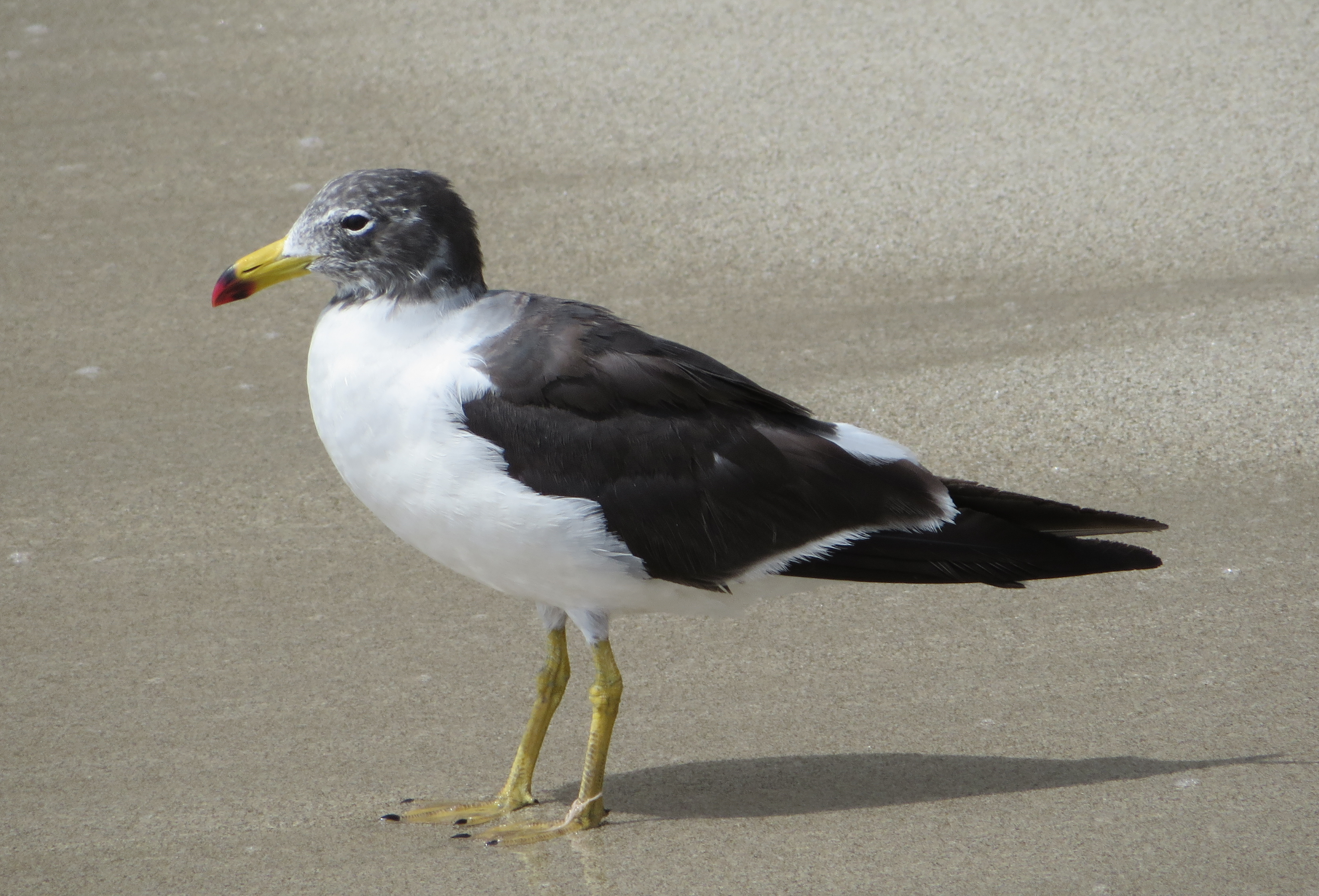
- Non-breeding adult

Conservation status
- Least Concern (IUCN 3.1)

Scientific classification
- Kingdom: Animalia
- Phylum: Chordata
- Class: Aves
- Order: Charadriiformes
- Family: Laridae
- Genus: Larus
- Species: L. belcheri

Binomial name
- Larus belcheri Vigors, 1829

= Belcher's gull =

Species of bird

Belcher's gull (Larus belcheri), also known as the band-tailed gull, is a bird in the family Laridae found along the Pacific coast of South America. It formerly included the very similar Olrog's gull as a subspecies, but that bird occurs on the Atlantic coast of South America and is now accepted as a separate species Larus atlanticus. Belcher's gull is a medium-sized gull with a blackish mantle, white head and underparts, a black band on the otherwise white tail, and a yellow bill with a red and black tip. Non-breeding adults have a brownish-black head and a white eye-ring. The name commemorates the British explorer Sir Edward Belcher, who performed survey work on the Pacific coast of South America.

== Description ==
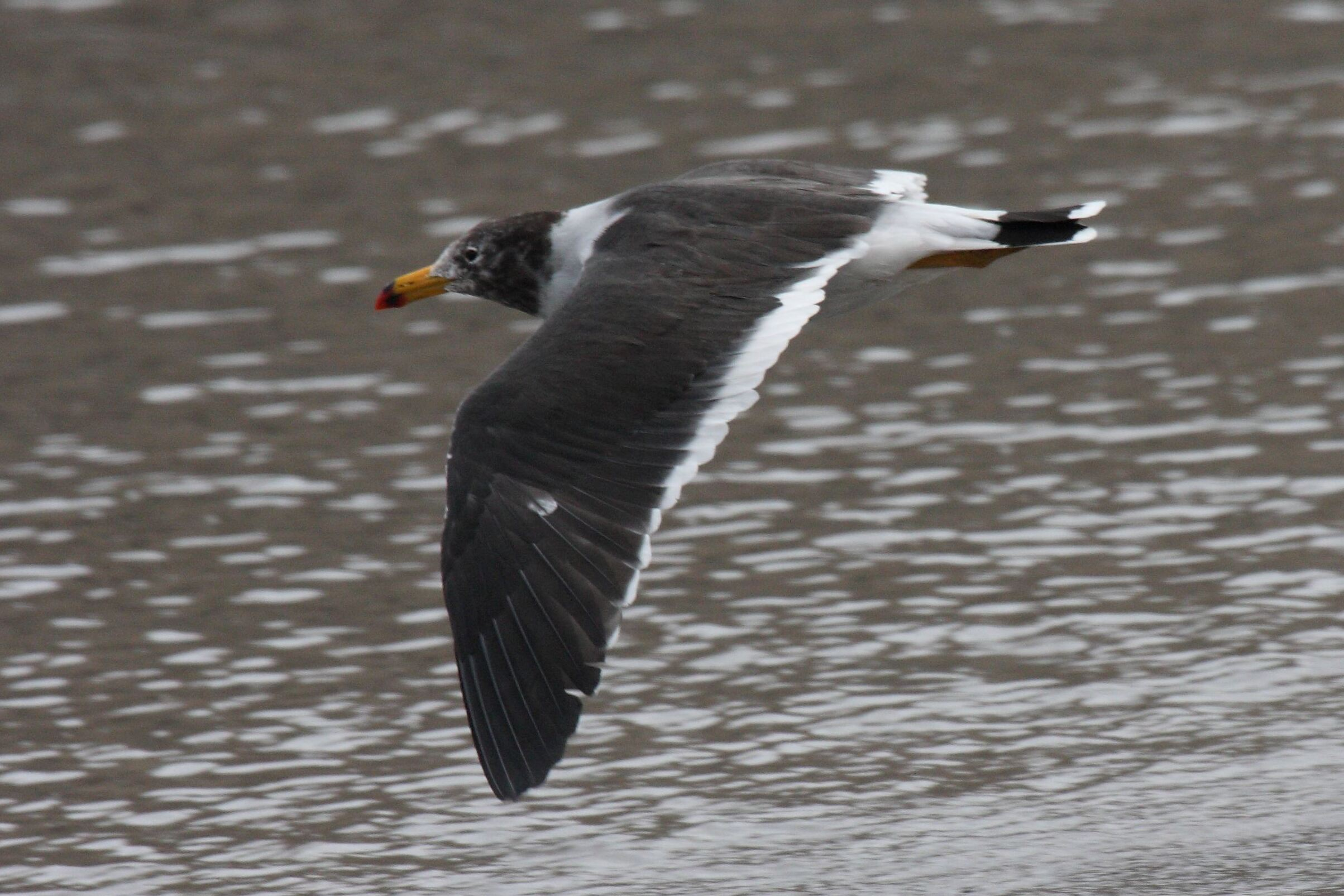
The band on the tail is a diagnostic feature.

Belcher's gull is 48–54 centimetres (19–21 in), with a wingspan of about 120 cm (47 in). The sexes are similar in appearance, and in the breeding season, the adult has a white head, very pale grey neck, and white underparts. The mantle and back are greyish-black, and the tail is white with a broad black subterminal band and a white trailing edge. The wing coverts and primaries are black and the secondaries dark grey with white tips. The eye is black, the bill yellow with a distinctive red and black tip, and the legs and feet yellow. Outside the breeding season the head is dark brown with a white ring surrounding the eye. The juvenile is mottled brown and white and attains the adult plumage during its third year.

Belcher's gull can be confused with the slightly larger kelp gull (Larus dominicanus), but that species has a small white tip on its otherwise black wing and lacks the black tail band found on Belcher's gull. Belcher's gull also has a red tip to the bill in all plumages except fresh juvenile, while in kelp gull, the tip is blackish in immatures and yellow with a subterminal red spot, not at the tip, in adults.

== Distribution and habitat ==
Belcher's gull is found on the Pacific coast of South America. Its range extends from northern Peru to northern Chile in the area influenced by the Humboldt Current. Its habitat includes rocky shores, bays and offshore islands. It ventures several kilometres offshore to forage and also feeds on rocky shores when the tide is out. It is a non-migratory species.

== Ecology ==
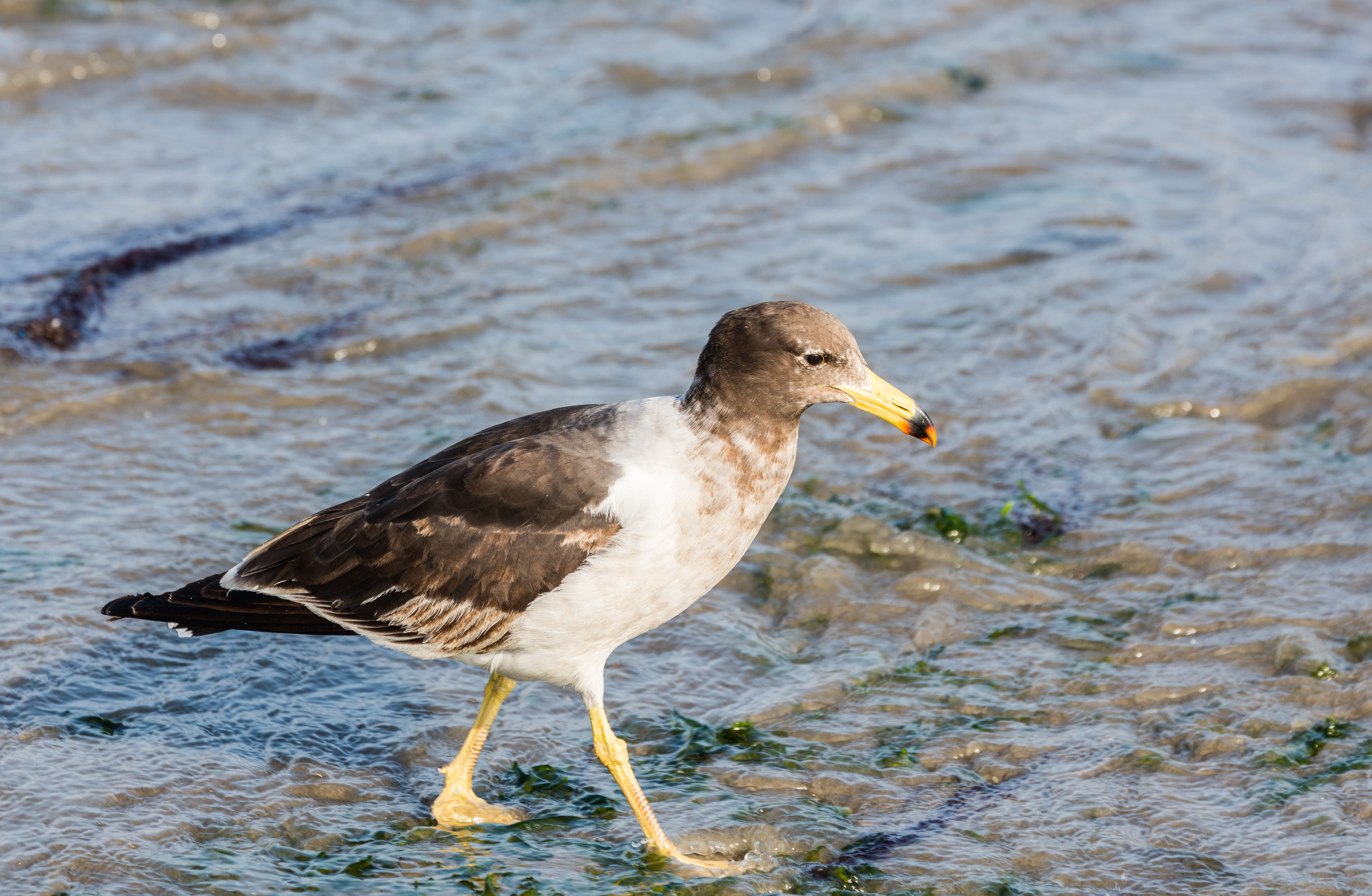
Foraging on the beach in Peru

Belcher's gull is an omnivore and scavenger. It feeds on fish, crabs, molluscs and carrion, and seasonally on the eggs and nestlings of seabirds. It often associates with Guanay cormorants, pestering them until they regurgitate their prey, which it then consumes.

Breeding takes place from December onwards in small colonies of up to one hundred pairs. The nest is a scrape in the sand or among rocks near the high tide line.

There are usually three eggs averaging 65 by 45 mm (2.6 by 1.8 in), pale blotched with dark olive markings.

== Status ==
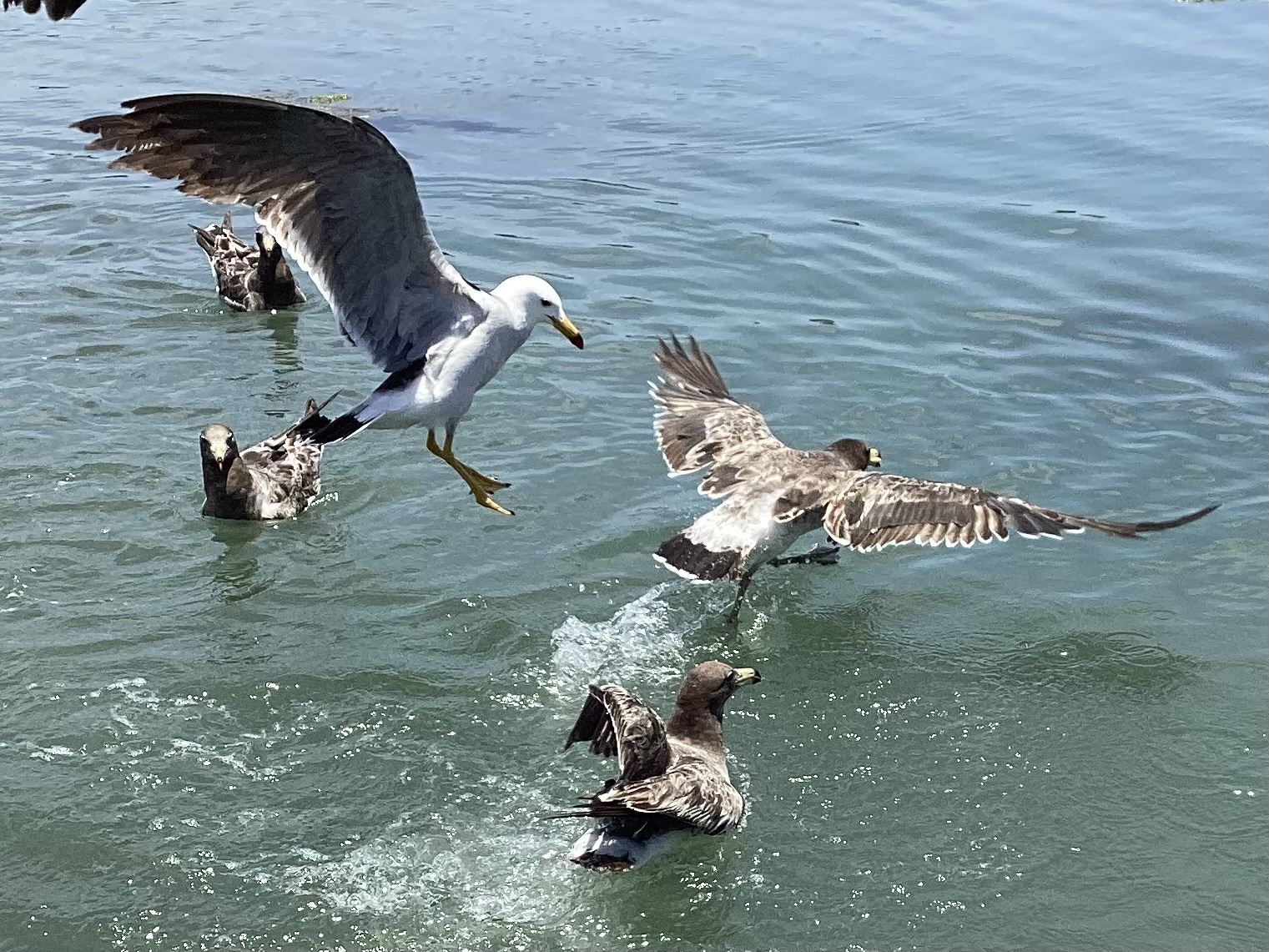
Adult and immature Belcher's gulls, Callao, Peru

Belcher's gull is estimated to have a total population of under ten thousand individuals and an estimated distribution range of 280,000 square kilometres (110,000 sq mi). Persecution of this bird by humans has diminished, and its population is thought to be increasing. For these reasons, despite its small total population size and limited range, the International Union for Conservation of Nature considers it to be of "least concern".
