= Glaucous-winged gull =

- Vancouver Island, BC, Canada

Conservation status
- Least Concern (IUCN 3.1)

Scientific classification
- Kingdom: Animalia
- Phylum: Chordata
- Class: Aves
- Order: Charadriiformes
- Family: Laridae
- Genus: Larus
- Species: L. glaucescens

Binomial name
- Larus glaucescens Naumann, 1840

Species of bird

The glaucous-winged gull (Larus glaucescens) is a large, white-headed gull. The genus name is from Latin Larus which appears to have referred to a gull or other large seabird. The specific glaucescens is Neo-Latin for "glaucous" from the Ancient Greek, glaukos, denoting the grey color of its wings.

== Range and lifespan ==
The glaucous-winged gull is rarely found far from the ocean. It is a resident from the western coast of Alaska to the coast of Washington. These glaucous winged gulls can be found in the Puget Sound region as well. It also breeds on the northwest coast of Alaska, in the summertime and in the Russian Far East. During winter, they can be found along the coast of California, Oregon, Baja California, Baja California Sur, and Sonora. Glaucous-winged gulls are thought to live about 15 years, but some live much longer; a bird in British Columbia, for example, lived for more than 21 years, while one in the US state of Washington lived for at least 22 years, 9 months. The longevity record, though, is more than 37 years, for a bird banded as a chick in British Columbia.

It is an exceptionally rare vagrant to the Western Palearctic region, with records from Morocco, the Canary Islands and, most recently, from Ireland in February and March 2016. It has also been recorded in Britain in the winters of 2006/2007 and 2008/2009. The 2008/2009 record was from Saltholme Pools, Cleveland, and attracted hundreds of twitchers.

== Description ==
This gull is a large bird, being close in size and shape to the closely related Western gull (L. occidentalis). It measures 50–68 cm (20–27 in) in length and 120–150 cm (47–59 in) in wingspan, with a body mass of 730–1,690 g (1.61–3.73 lb). It weighs around 1,010 g (2.23 lb) on average. Among standard measurements, the wing chord is 39.2 to 48 cm (15.4 to 18.9 in), the bill is 4.6 to 6.4 cm (1.8 to 2.5 in) and the tarsus is 5.8 to 7.8 cm (2.3 to 3.1 in). It has a white head, neck, breast, and belly, a white tail. The silver-gray wings and back form the mantle, which is darker than that of the Glaucous gull and paler than the Herring gull and Western Gull. The primary flight feathers (wingtips) are grey, usually the same shade as the mantle. Its legs are pink and the beak is yellow with a red subterminal spot (the spot near the end of the bill that chicks peck in order to stimulate regurgitative feeding). The irises are typically very dark, and surrounded by pink orbital skin. The forehead is somewhat flat. During the winter, the head and nape is darker with a varied smudged or mottled pattern, and the bill colour becomes duller, often with dark markings near the tip. Young birds are brown or gray with black beaks, and take four years to reach adult plumage.

== Behaviour ==
The glaucous-winged gull nests in the summer, and each pair produces two or three chicks which fledge at six weeks.

It feeds along the coast, scavenging for dead or weak animals, fish, mussels and scraps. In urban areas it is well known for its tendency to accept food from people and peck open unprotected garbage bags in search of edibles.

Its call is a low-pitched "kak-kak-kak" or "wow", or a more high-pitched wailing.

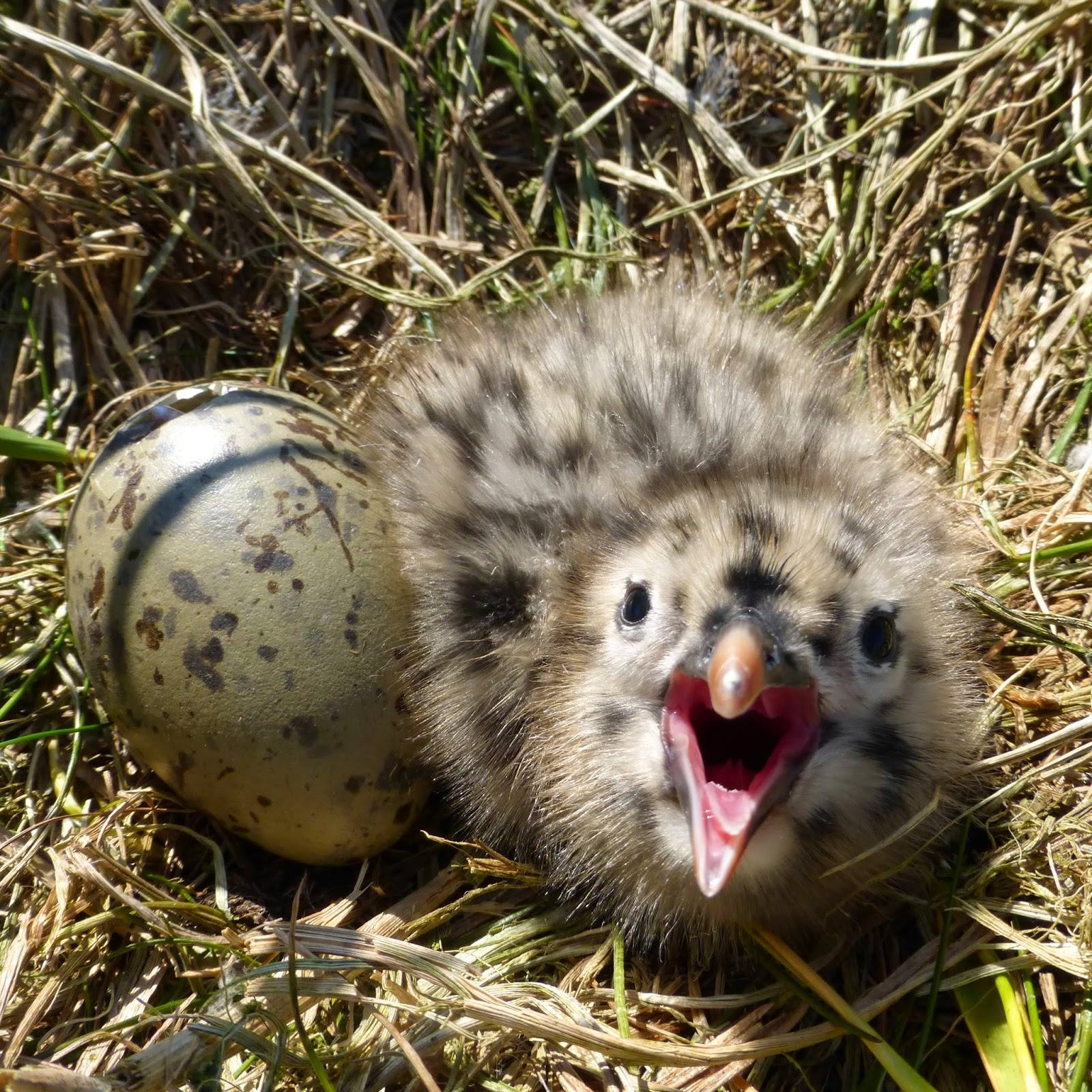
Newborn chick and egg in nest, St. Lazaria Island, Alaska

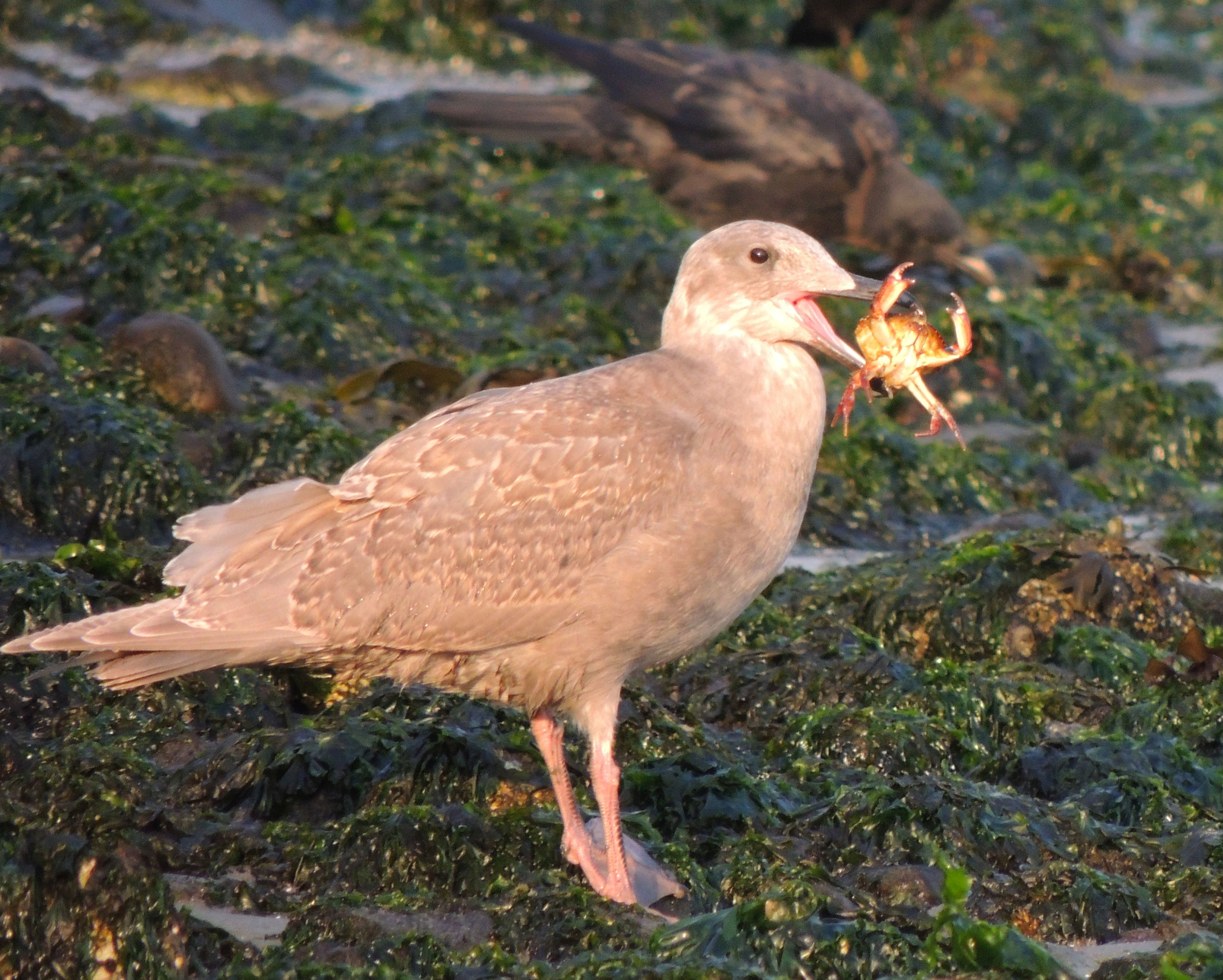
Juvenile feeding on a crab

off Tofino, Vancouver Island

== Hybridization ==
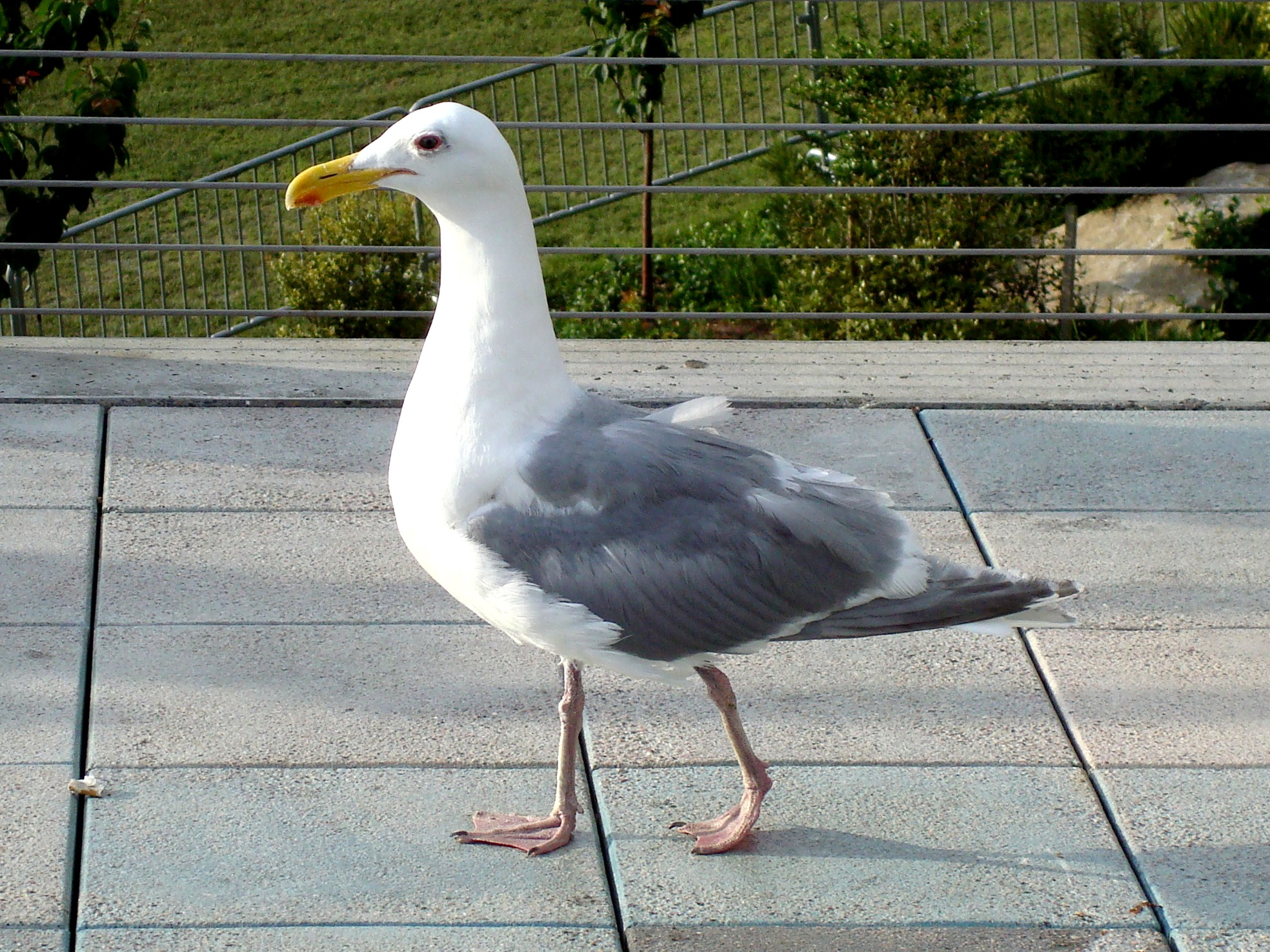
Glaucous-winged x Western Gull hybrid. Note the dark grey wingtips and large bill.

The Glaucous-winged Gull frequently hybridizes with the Western Gull where their ranges overlap in Washington and Oregon. In the Puget Sound area, hybrids may outnumber pure birds and backcross with either parent species leading to further identification problems. Referred to as the Olympic Gull, this hybrid is found along the Pacific coast from British Columbia south to California. Hybrids are variable and have characteristics of either parent species. Often they resemble Glaucous-winged Gulls but have darker grey wingtips which strongly contrast from the mantle, and may have a heavier bill more typical of Western Gulls. Hybrids also tend to exhibit dark head markings in nonbreeding plumage, compared to the virtually unstreaked white head of pure Western Gulls.

The prevalence of 'Olympic Gull' hybrids is an example of bounded hybrid superiority, where natural selection favours hybrids in areas of intermediate habitat. One study found that females paired with hybrid males have higher breeding success than pairs of the same species. In the central part of the hybrid zone, clutch size was larger among pairs with hybrid males, many of which established breeding grounds in more vegetative cover than pure western gull males, which preferred sand habitat resulting in heavier predation. In the northern section of the hybrid zone, there was no difference in clutch size, but breeding success is higher due to the hybrids being more similar to western gulls in foraging behaviour, feeding more on fish than glaucous-winged gulls. Little evidence of assortative mating was observed, except for weak assortative mating among hybrids in absence of mixed species pairs.

This species also hybridizes regularly with the American herring gull in southern Alaska, sometimes referred to as the Cook Inlet gull. This hybrid combination may be found along the Pacific coast from Alaska down to southern California, and are highly variable, sometimes resembling Thayer's gull but with a larger bill and inconsistent wing pattern. They typically have paler eyes and darker primaries than Glaucous-winged, and the winter head pattern of either parent species (Herring gull has a more streaked winter hood).

Hybrids with Glaucous gull are common in west Alaska where up to 50% of birds in the Seward Peninsula are hybrids, and rare visitors further south to Japan and California. Hybrids with Slaty-backed gull are uncommon but have been known to breed on the east coast of the Kamchatka Peninsula and Commander Islands, reaching south to Japan in winter.
