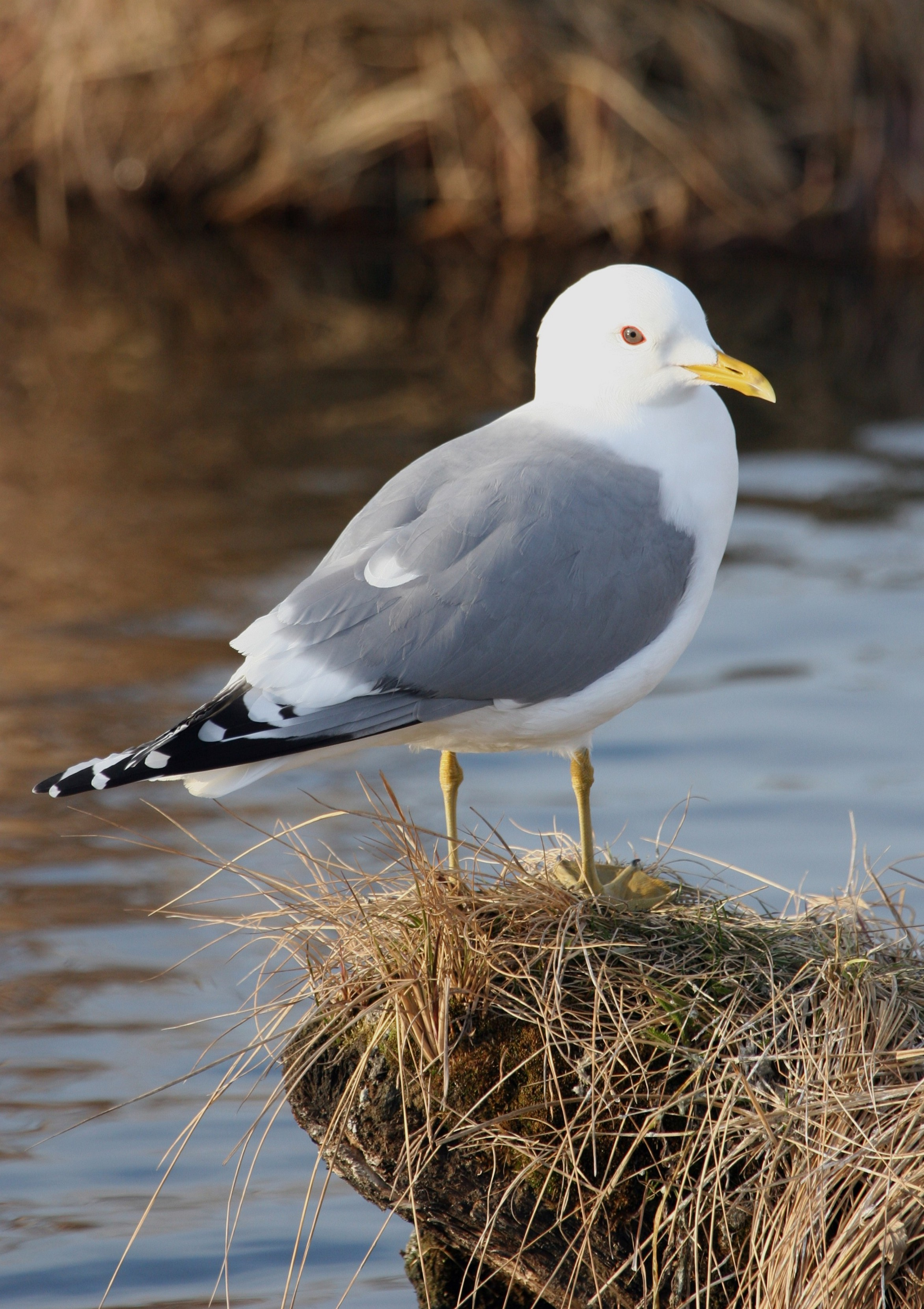
- Adult in summer plumage
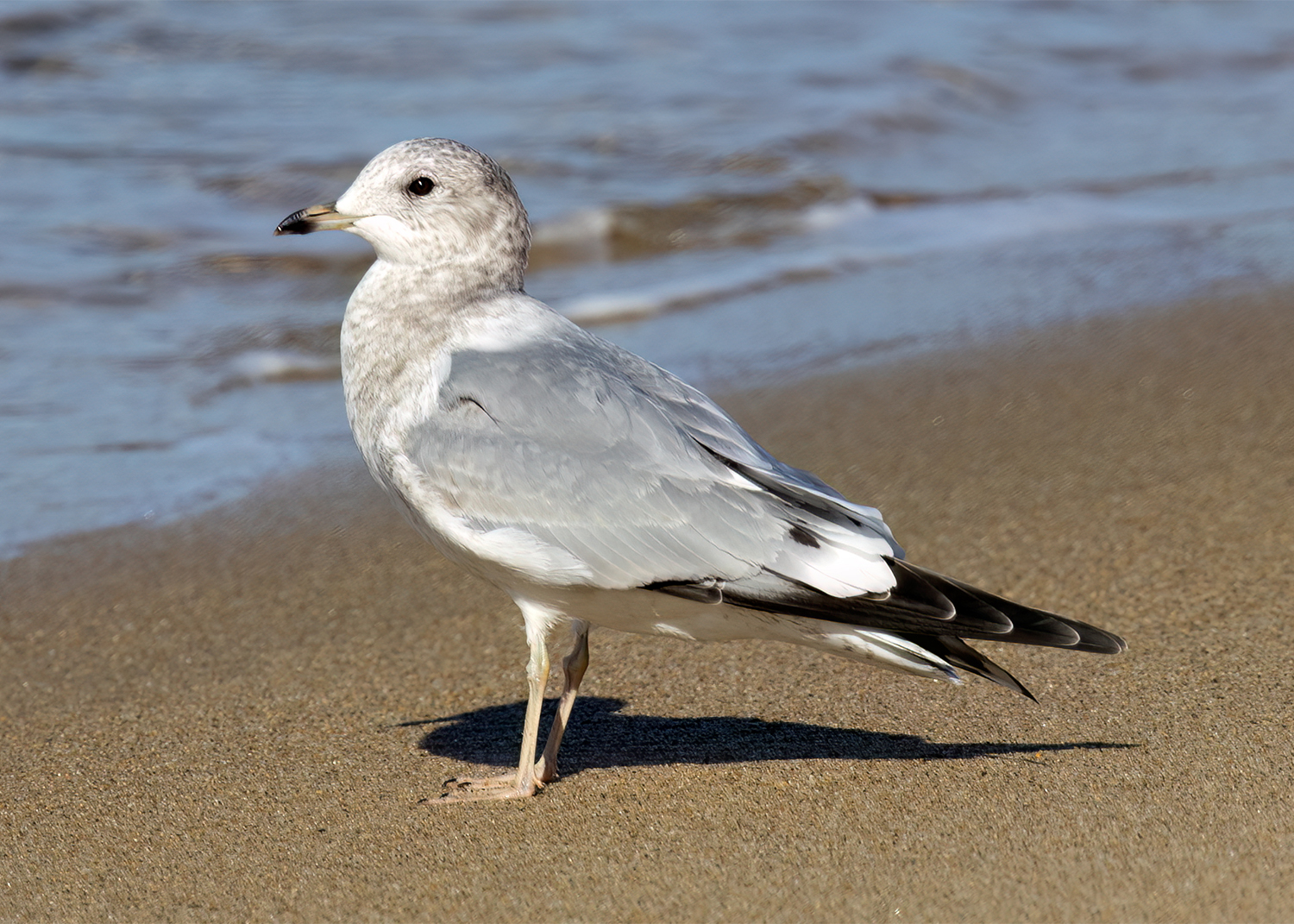
- Adult in winter plumage

Scientific classification
- Kingdom: Animalia
- Phylum: Chordata
- Class: Aves
- Order: Charadriiformes
- Family: Laridae
- Genus: Larus
- Species: L. brachyrhynchus

Binomial name
- Larus brachyrhynchus Richardson, 1831

= Short-billed gull =

Gull species native to western North America

The short-billed gull (Larus brachyrhynchus) is a species of gull that breeds in northwestern North America. In North America, it was previously known as the mew gull, when it was considered conspecific with the palearctic common gull (Larus canus). Most authorities, including the American Ornithological Society in 2021, have split the two populations as distinct species.

== Taxonomy ==
The species was first described by Scottish naturalist John Richardson in 1831 as the 'short-billed mew gull', Larus brachyrhynchus.

Though some authorities, including the American Ornithologist's Union from 1931 onwards, have long considered brachyrhynchus to be a subspecies of the common gull, others have recognized the two as distinct species. In 2021, the American Ornithological Society agreed to split the short-billed gull as a distinct species based on differences in genetics, plumage, morphology and vocalizations. Though 'mew gull' has been used as name for the species in North America, the name short-billed gull was chosen due to the usage of "mew gull" in recent literature to denote all forms of L. canus and the fact that short-billed gull was previously used in older AOS checklists since 1886.

== Description ==
The short-billed gull has a length 40–45 cm (16–18 in) and a wingspan 100–120 cm (39–47 in). It is smaller than other gulls in the Common gull complex, with a shorter bill and longer wings. Its wings appear long and narrow in flight relative to its short body. In breeding plumage, adults have a white head, pale eyes surrounded by a red orbital skin, yellow legs and bill with no markings. In winter, the head is marked with brown mottling, the eye orbital skin becomes grayish and the bill becomes duller with a faint dark marking. In flight, the two outermost primary feathers (p9 and p10) have conspicuous white spots or "mirrors". Between p5 and p8, the primaries have white "tongue tips" which form a 'string of pearls' transitioning to the broad white trailing edge. p4 usually has a black markings in many birds. In comparison, common gulls have a larger bill and shorter wings. The wingtips of common gulls have more extensive black wingtips with smaller mirrors on p9-10, a narrower trailing edge, and typically lack black markings on p4 as well as the white tongue tip on p8.

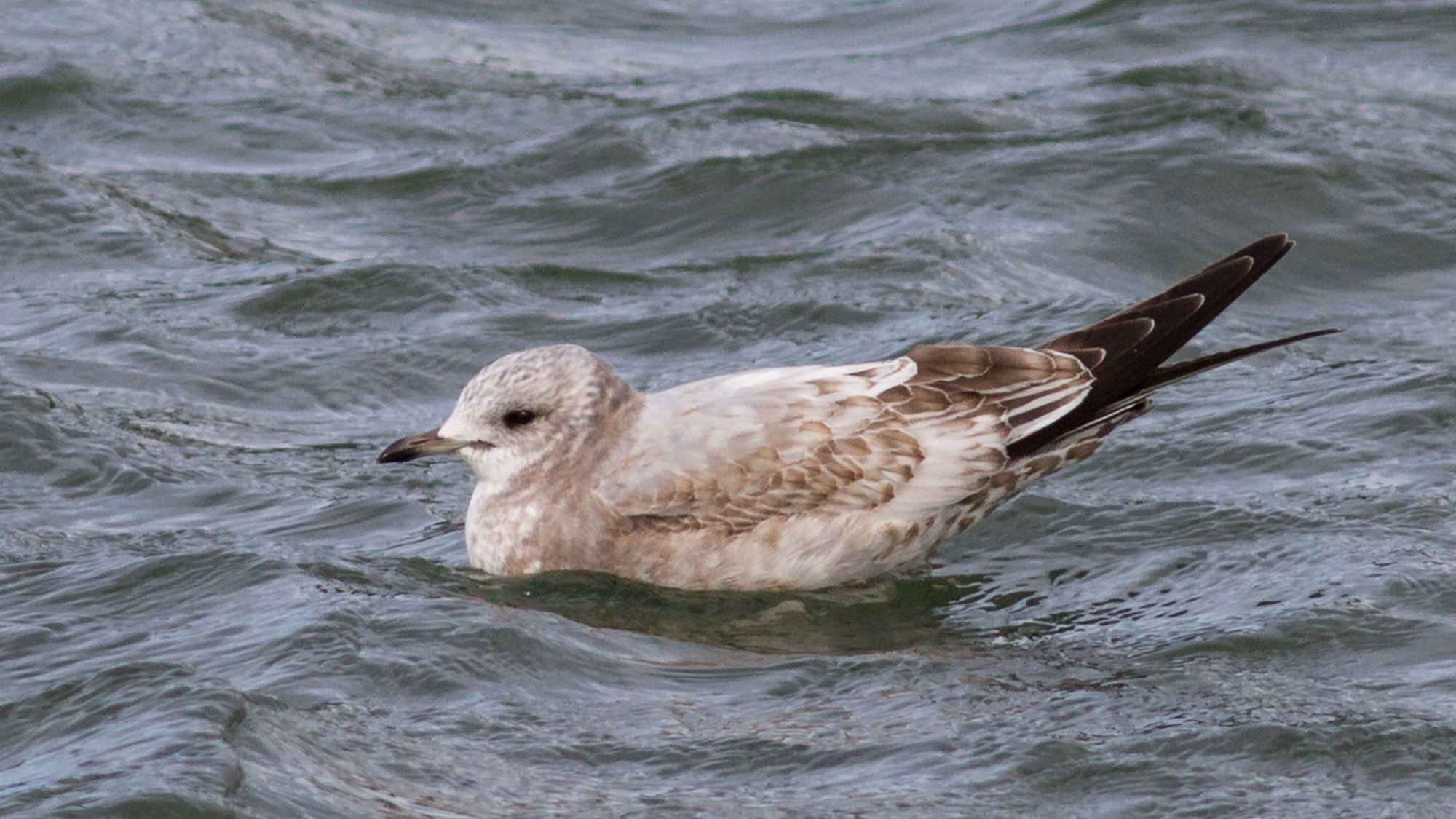
First-winter short-billed gull

Short-billed gulls take 3 years to attain breeding plumage. Juveniles are brownish overall with dark brown wingtips. They appear darker and more smudged on the head and neck, compared to the paler and finely-marked common gull, which more closely resembles Ring-billed gull at this stage. Many first-year birds retain juvenile plumage through the winter, but some grow grayish saddle feathers intermixed with juvenile feathers. The bill becomes pink at the base with a black tip by the first winter. Second-year birds resemble adults but may have brown wing covert feathers and black markings on the tertials, lacking white spots on the wingtips except the p10 mirror. Third-year birds are similar to adults but may have dark markings on primary coverts, secondaries, underwing and tail, with more extensive black on the wingtips.

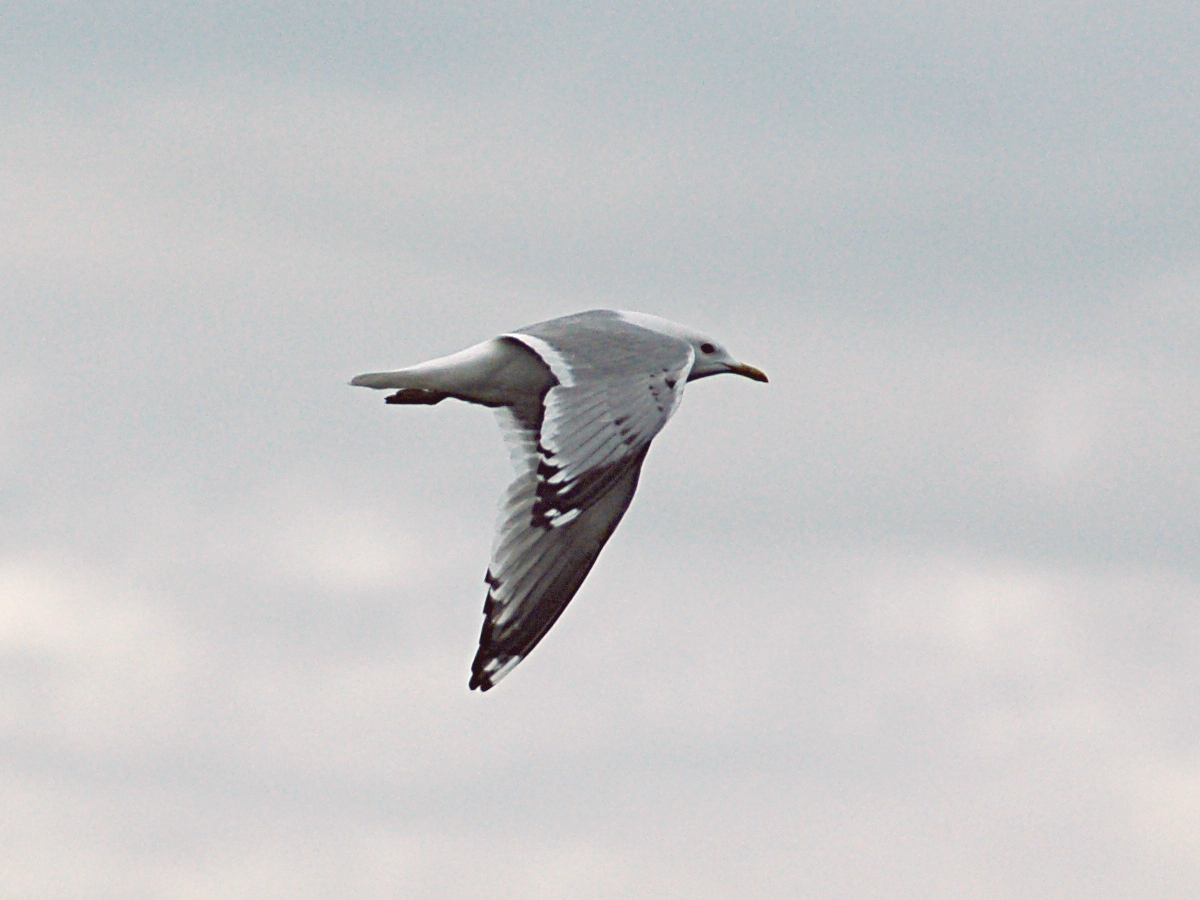
Subadult (third-year) short-billed gull in flight. Note the white tongue tips forming a "string of pearls" between primaries 5 and 8.

== Distribution ==
The short-billed gull breeds in colonies along coastal areas and inland wetlands, mainly in Alaska and Northwest Canada. Most birds winter along the Pacific coast down to the Sacramento Valley, and less frequently to Baja California, the Northern Rockies and Ontario. It is a very rare visitor to eastern North America and a vagrant to east Asia. There are two records of short-billed gull in Europe, on the Azores in 2003 and the Faroe Islands in 2026.
