= Larus oregonus =

†Larus oregonus Temporal range: Pleistocene

Scientific classification
- Kingdom: Animalia
- Phylum: Chordata
- Class: Aves
- Order: Charadriiformes
- Family: Laridae
- Genus: Larus
- Species: †L. oregonus

Binomial name
- †Larus oregonus Shufeldt, 1891

Extinct species of gull

Larus oregonus is an extinct species of gull that lived during the Late Pleistocene.

== Etymology ==
The genus name Larus derives from Ancient Greek, referring to a seabird. The species name oregonus derives from Oregon, the state where Edward Drinker Cope collected the type specimen.

== Description ==
Larus oregonus specimens stem from Fossil Lake, Oregon and Camp Cady, California. Larus oregonus is about the same size as the ring-billed gull (Larus delawarensis).
