= Larus elmorei =

†Larus elmorei Temporal range: Pliocene

Scientific classification
- Kingdom: Animalia
- Phylum: Chordata
- Class: Aves
- Order: Charadriiformes
- Family: Laridae
- Genus: Larus
- Species: †L. elmorei

Binomial name
- †Larus elmorei Brodkorb, 1953

Extinct species of gull

Larus elmorei is an extinct species of gull that lived during the mid-Pliocene.

== Etymology ==
The genus name Larus derives from Ancient Greek, referring to a seabird. The species name elmorei derives from the last name of George C. Elmore, Mining Superintendent of the American Agricultural Chemical Company in Florida, who collected the type specimen.

== Description ==
Larus elmorei specimens stem from the Bone Valley Formation in Polk County, Florida. Larus elmorei is most similar in size to the California gull (Larus californicus), being slightly smaller.
