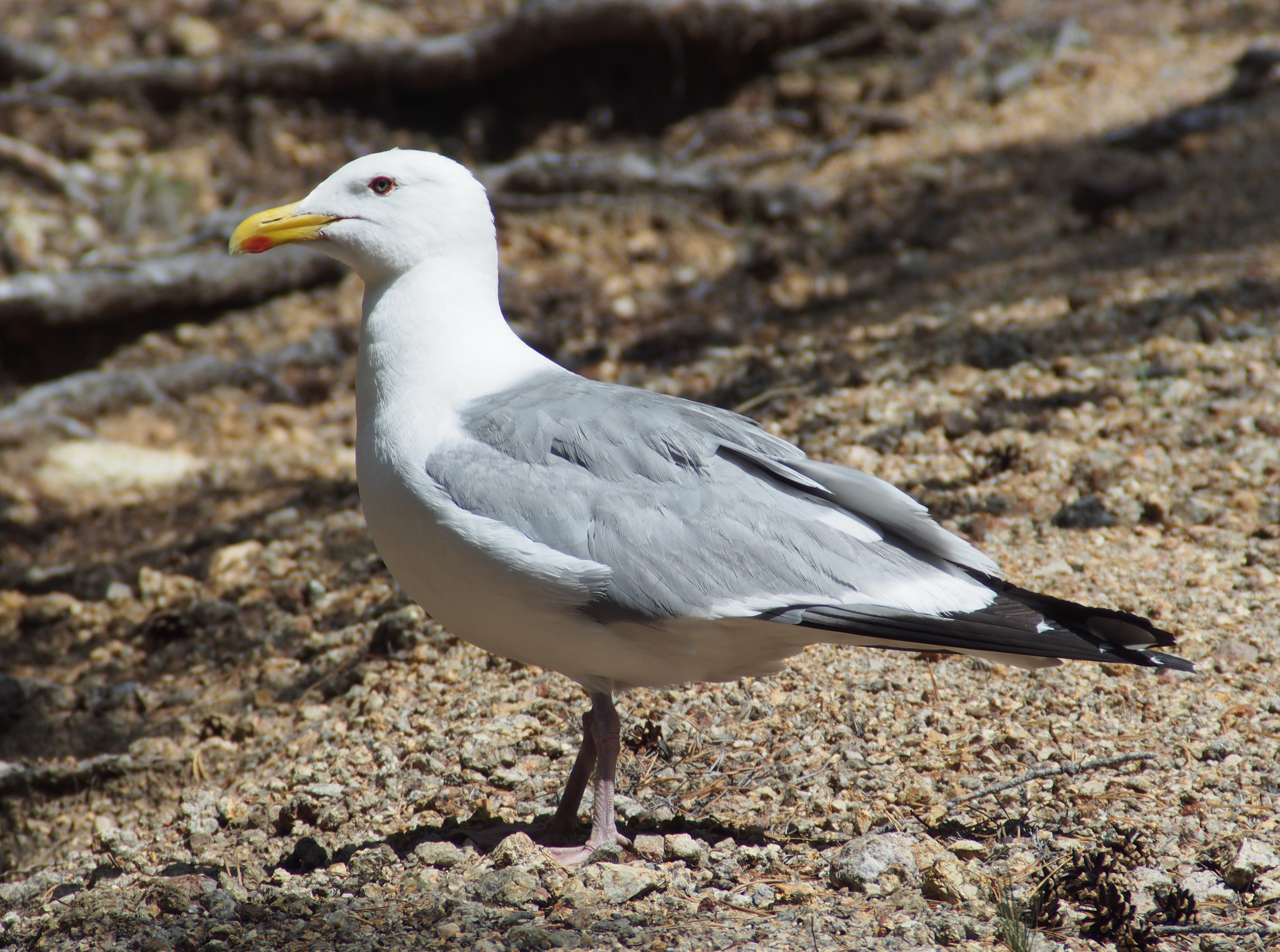
- Mongolian gull on Lake Baikal, Russia.

Scientific classification
- Kingdom: Animalia
- Phylum: Chordata
- Class: Aves
- Order: Charadriiformes
- Family: Laridae
- Genus: Larus
- Species: L. mongolicus

Binomial name
- Larus mongolicus Sushkin, 1925

Synonyms
- Larus argentatus mongolicus; Larus vegae mongolicus; Larus cachinnans mongolicus

= Mongolian gull =

Species of bird

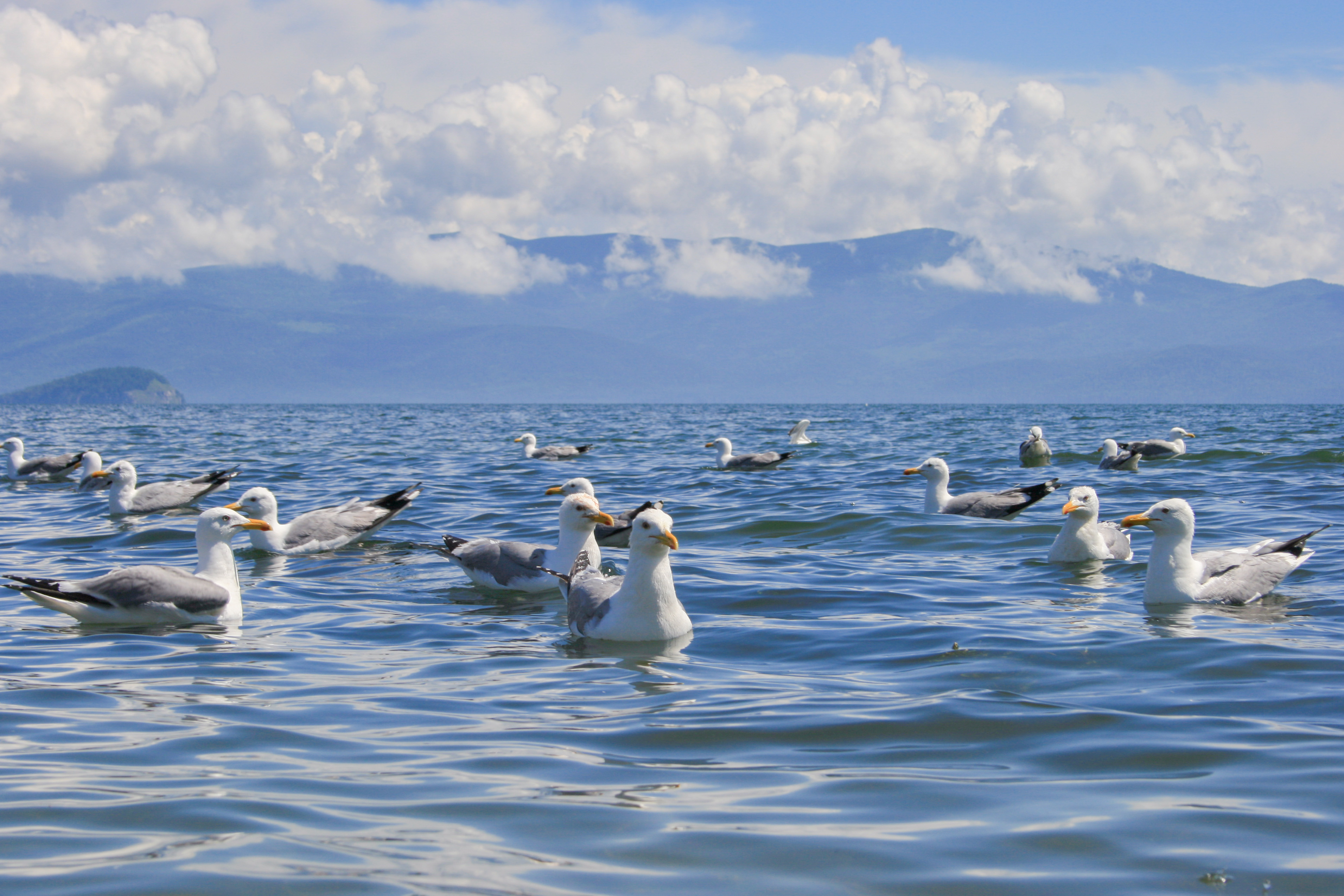
Adult Mongolian gulls swimming on Lake Baikal

The Mongolian gull (Larus mongolicus) is a large gull in the large white-headed gull (Larus) complex which breeds in interior eastern Asia.

== Taxonomy ==
The Mongolian gull was formally described in 1925 by the Russian ornithologist Petr Sushkin based on specimens collected near the Üüreg Lake in northwest Mongolia. He considered it to be a subspecies of the then broad view of the herring gull and coined the trinomial name Larus argentatus mongolicus.

When the herring gull was split into multiple more closely defined species, this Mongolian population was subsequently considered to be a subspecies of either the Vega gull (Larus vegae) from further north in northeastern Siberia, or of the Caspian gull (Larus cachinnans) from further west. In 2024 it was raised to separate species rank based on its distinct morphology and vocal repertoire.

== Description ==
Mongolian gull is closely similar to its relatives Caspian gull and Vega gull, and also to the European herring gull (Larus argentatus), with identification needing careful examination of the wing pattern and moult, and in young birds, the wing and tail patterns. In weight, at 1.15–1.58 kg for males and 0.85–1.1 kg for females, it is somewhat heavier than Caspian gull but about the same as Vega gull and the nominate subspecies of European herring gull. The mantle and wings are mid grey with black primary tips, distinctly darker grey than European herring gull and slightly darker than Caspian gull, but about the same as Vega gull. There is some variation within the species, with darker grey towards the west of the range in NW Mongolia, and paler in birds from Lake Baikal; these last can be almost as pale as European herring gull of the subspecies L. a. argenteus. The legs are pink in most individuals, but in some, tinged yellow to even bright yellow; the eyes are dull yellowish, sometimes brownish; the bill is stout, as in European herring gull and Vega gull, stouter than in Caspian gull.

== Distribution and habitat ==
The Mongolian gull breeds primarily on large inland lakes, either fresh or saline, from the Altai Republic to Lake Baikal in central southern Russia, in northern Mongolia, and at Lake Khanka in northeast China; there is also a small population breeding on islands in the Yellow Sea west of South Korea, within the normal wintering area. In winter it migrates southeast to the coasts of Japan, the Korean Peninsula, eastern and southern China, Taiwan, and northern Vietnam. Reports from the Indian Ocean are considered unlikely, with sightings claimed from India, Pakistan and the Persian Gulf being unreliable; there are no ringing recoveries from that region, only from the Pacific coasts of Asia.
