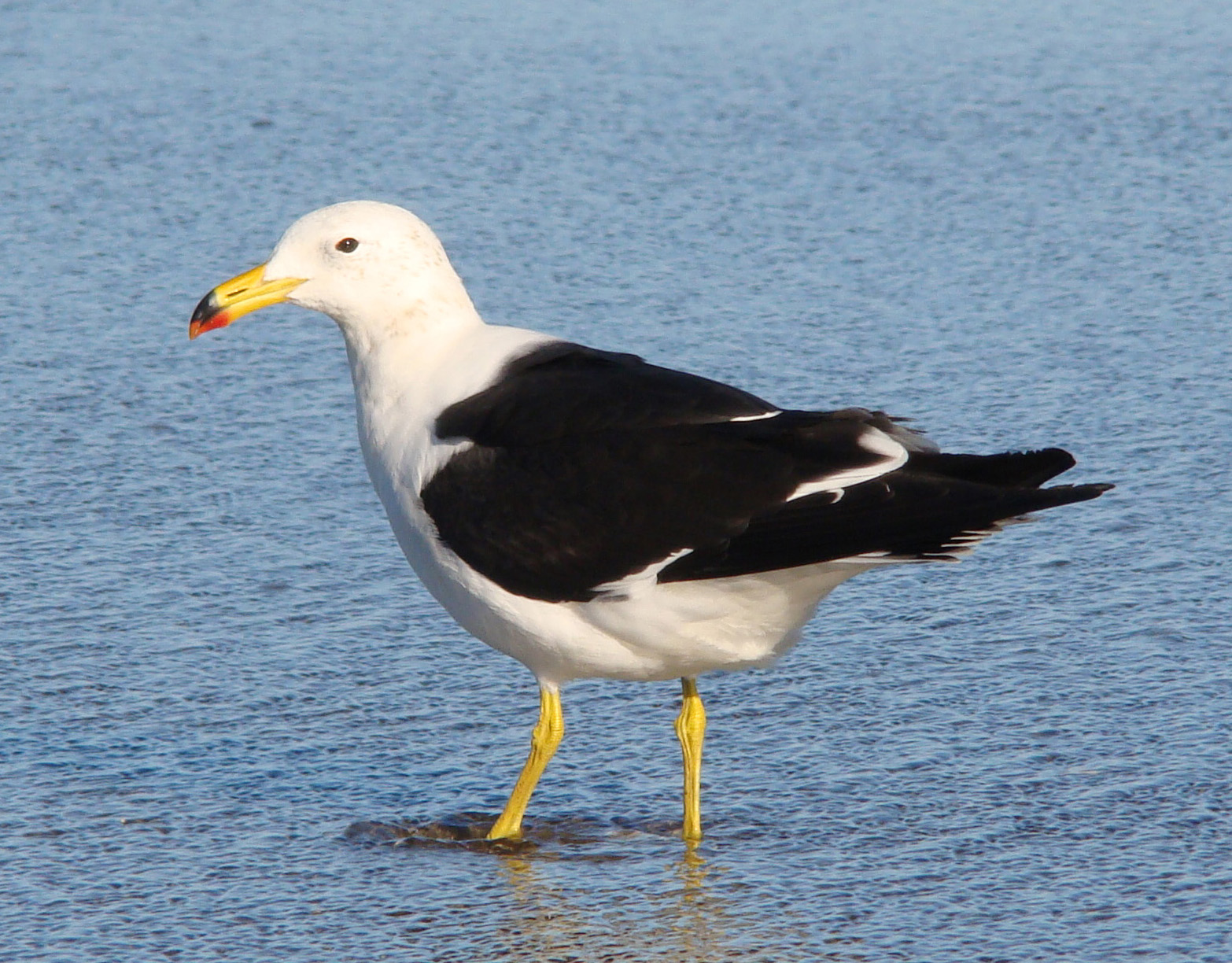

Conservation status
- Near Threatened (IUCN 3.1)

Scientific classification
- Kingdom: Animalia
- Phylum: Chordata
- Class: Aves
- Order: Charadriiformes
- Family: Laridae
- Genus: Larus
- Species: L. atlanticus

Binomial name
- Larus atlanticus Olrog, 1958

= Olrog's gull =

Species of bird

Olrog's gull (Larus atlanticus) is a species of gull found along the Atlantic coast of southern Brazil, Uruguay, and northern Argentina. It was formerly considered a subspecies of the very similar L. belcheri. It is a large gull with a black back and wings, white head and underparts, a black band in the otherwise white tail, and a yellow bill with a red and black tip. Nonbreeding adults have a blackish head and a white eye ring. The species is named after Swedish-Argentine biologist Claes C. Olrog. It has a rather restricted breeding range and is threatened by habitat loss, and the IUCN has rated it as being "near threatened".

== Description ==
Olrog's gull is a large gull with a white head, neck, rump, breast, and belly. The back and wings are black except for a white trailing edge to the wings. The tail is white with a broad black band at the back. The beak is yellow with a black band and red tip. The eyes are brown with a red orbital ring and the legs and feet are dull yellow. The length of this gull is 50 to 60 cm (20 to 24 in) and it has a wingspan of 130 to 140 cm (51 to 55 in). Males are a little larger than females. Juveniles have black heads and brownish plumage.

== Distribution ==
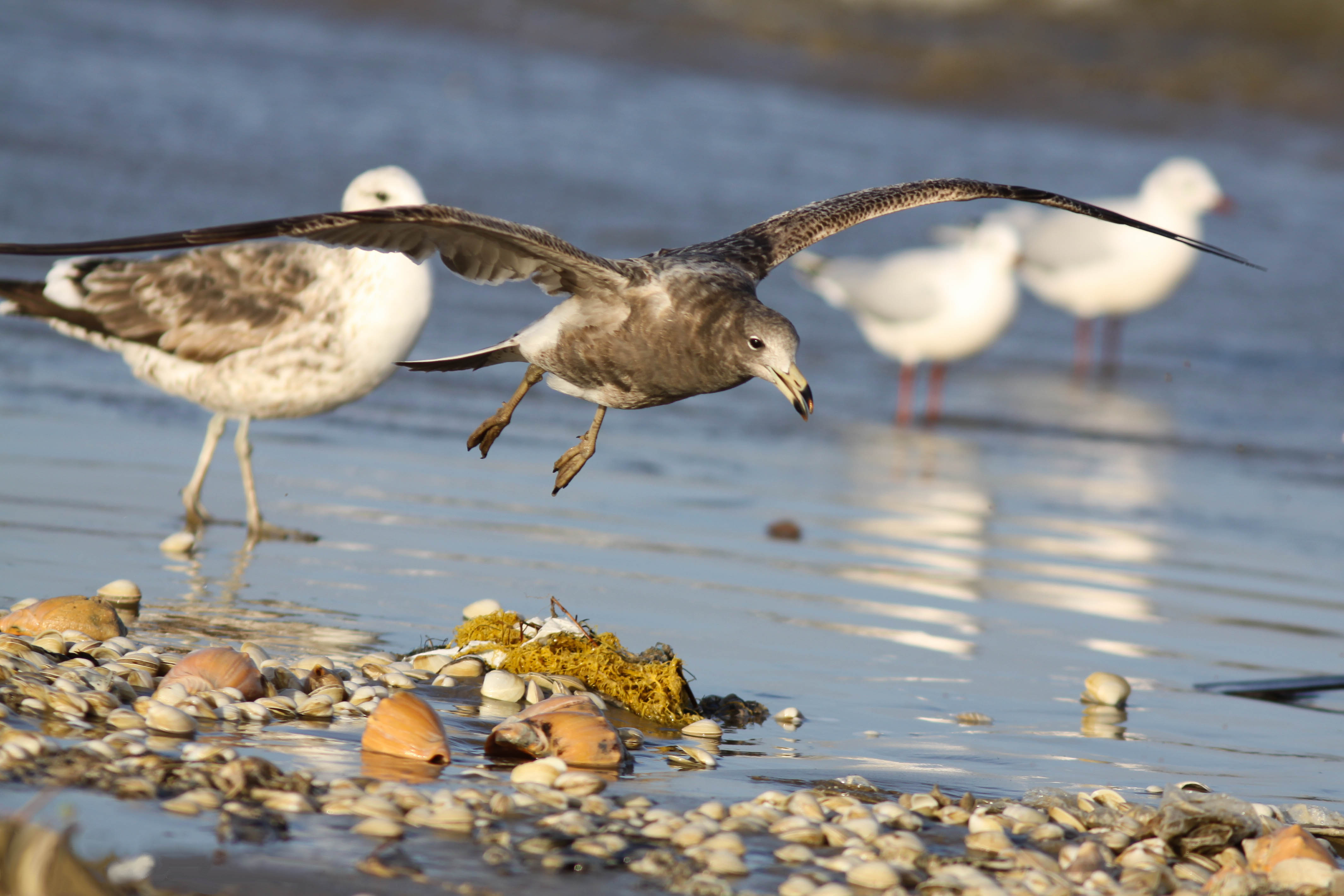
South Brazil

Olrog's gull is native to the Atlantic coast of Argentina, Uruguay, and southern Brazil. It breeds at a very limited number of colonies between 38.49° and 45.11°S, about two-thirds of which are in the estuary of the Bahia Blanca River. It nests on the ground just above high-water mark, on low islands and islets. At other times, it is to be seen on rocky coasts, harbours, beaches, coastal lagoons, brackish water, and estuaries.

== Behavior ==
During the breeding season, Olrog's gull feeds largely on crabs, which are picked up from the exposed shore or the seabed while walking or swimming, or dipping under the surface of shallow water. This particular diet gives the gull its name in its native range: gaviota cangrejera, or crab-eater gull.

At other times of year, it supplements its crab diet with bivalve molluscs and polychaete worms. Other prey items include insects, gastropod molluscs, fish, and fish waste, and the birds sometimes visit sewage outlets and refuse dumps.

Breeding starts in September and October. Olrog's gull is monogamous and nests in dense colonies. The nest is on rock, sand, or shingle and is usually lined with vegetation, but sometimes with seaweed, feathers, shells or bones. Two or three olive-brown eggs with brown splotches are laid and the incubation period is about 30 days. Fledging takes place between November and January according to the location of the colony.
