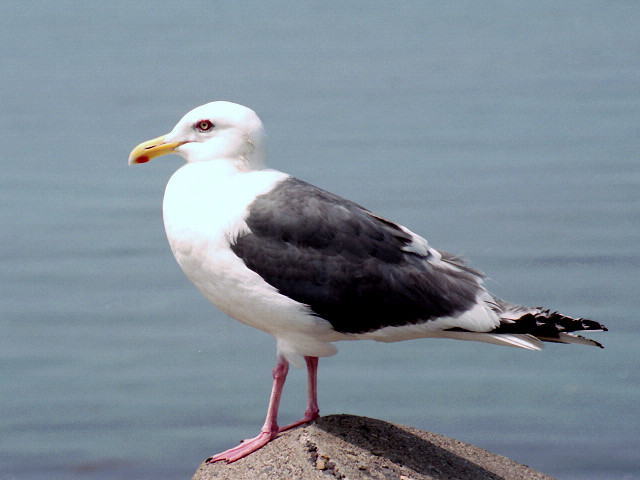

Conservation status
- Least Concern (IUCN 3.1)

Scientific classification
- Kingdom: Animalia
- Phylum: Chordata
- Class: Aves
- Order: Charadriiformes
- Family: Laridae
- Genus: Larus
- Species: L. schistisagus

Binomial name
- Larus schistisagus Stejneger, 1884

= Slaty-backed gull =

Species of bird

The slaty-backed gull (Larus schistisagus) is a large, white-headed gull that breeds on the north-eastern coast of the Palearctic, but travels widely during nonbreeding seasons. It is similar in appearance to the western gull and the glaucous-winged gull. Another alternate name is Pacific gull, though it also applies to a Southern Hemisphere species, L. pacificus.

== Etymology ==
The genus name is from Latin larus, which appears to have referred to a gull or other large seabird. The specific schistisagus is from Neo-Latin schistus, "slate", and Latin sagus, "cloak".

== Distribution and habitat ==
The Slaty-backed Gull is native to the Pacific coast of northeastern Asia. Individuals have strayed to various places throughout North America, including Alaska, New England and Texas. On 3 November 2012, an individual was spotted in Finland. The species has only been spotted three times before in Europe.

== Description ==
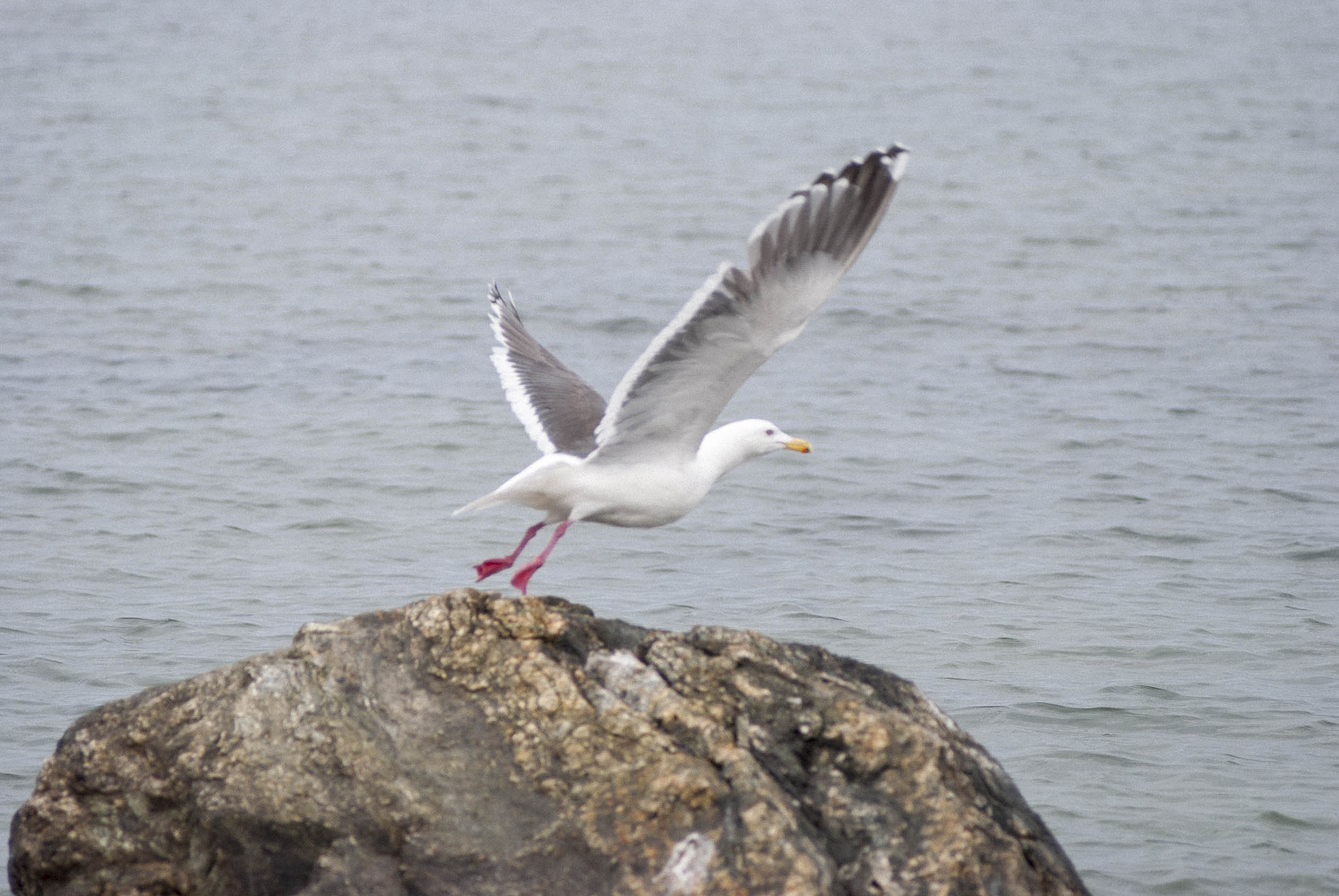
Slaty-backed gull showing distinctive "string of pearls" wing pattern on the tongue tips of the mid-primaries.

It is tied with the yellow-footed gull for fourth-largest gull species, measuring 55–68.5 cm (21.7–27.0 in) in length, 132–160 cm (52–63 in) in wingspan, and 1.05–1.7 kg (2.3–3.7 lb) in weight. Among standard measurements, the wing chord is 40 to 48 cm (16 to 19 in), the bill is 4.8 to 6.5 cm (1.9 to 2.6 in), and the tarsus is 6 to 7.6 cm (2.4 to 3.0 in). It has a white head, belly, and tail with a dark slaty-gray back and wings with a broad white trailing edge. The wings and back are slightly darker than those of the western gull (Kodak grey scale 9.5 to 12 compared to Kodak 9 to 11 of the darker southern subspecies of Western Gull). On the outer primaries (p9 and p10), there are white spots called mirrors. The inner webs to primaries are pale grey, and the mid-primaries have long grey tongues tipped with large white crescents, forming a "string of pearls" pattern connecting to the broad white trailing edge of the secondaries. Its eyes are yellow surrounded by purple to deep pink orbital skin. The legs are pink and short when compared with those of similar-looking gulls, and the body appears more stout with a "pot-bellied" appearance. The bill is yellow with orange-red subterminal spot (the spot near the end of the bill that chicks peck to stimulate regurgitative feeding). Immature gulls' plumage is brown, similar to that of the great black-backed gull, but paler, and is practically indistinguishable from the immature herring gull in the field.
