= Carabus nanschanicus =

Scientific classification
- Kingdom: Animalia
- Phylum: Arthropoda
- Class: Insecta
- Order: Coleoptera
- Suborder: Adephaga
- Family: Carabidae
- Genus: Carabus
- Species: C. nanschanicus

Binomial name
- Carabus nanschanicus Semenov, 1898

Species of beetle

Carabus nanschanicus is a species of black coloured ground beetle in the Carabinae subfamily that can be found in Qinghai and Sichuan provinces of China.
