= Theodor Pleske =

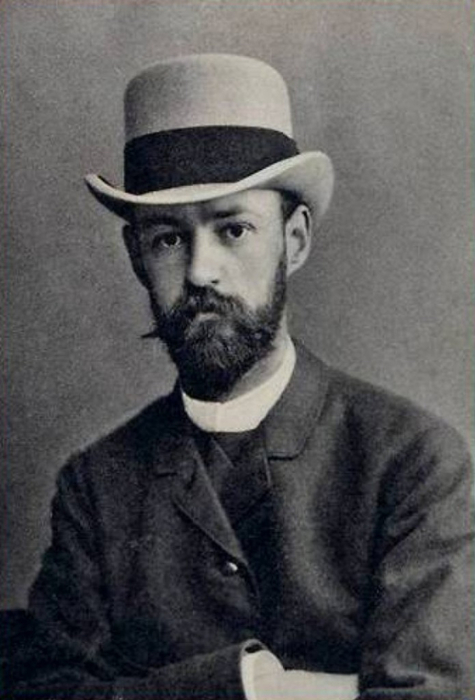
Pleske before 1900

Theodor Eduard Pleske (Russian: Фёдор Эдуардович (Дмитриевич) Плеске, romanized: Fyodor Eduardovich (Dmitriyevich) Pleske; 23 July [O.S. 11 July] 1858 – 1 August 1932) was a Russian entomologist and ornithologist who worked at the Zoological Museum in St. Petersburg.

== Early life and education ==
Pleske was born in Peterhof to the upper class German family of Eduard Ludwig Pleske (1817–1873) and Margaret Elisabeth Oom (1882–1880). His brother was Eduard Dmitrievich Pleske (1854–1904) who served in the finance ministry. Pleske went to the St. Petri-Schule, graduating in 1878 to join St. Petersburg University.

== Career ==
In 1880, he joined an expedition to the Kola Peninsula organized by the St. Petersburg Society of Naturalists. He was already interested in birds and made collections which he donated to the Zoological Museum in 1881, where he worked under V. F. Russov and M. N. Bogdanov. After graduating, he worked in Vladivostok in the administration but his health suffered and he returned in 1883 to St Petersburg and joined the museum as a volunteer. After the retirement of Bogdanov in 1886 he became an assistant of the director A. A. Strauch. He worked on the birds of the Kola peninsula and then studied the collections of Russov from Turkmenistan. In 1893, Strauch recommended Pleske for election to the Academy of Sciences. Pleske was made a member of the managing committee of the museum. Under Pleske, the museum was to be reconstructed.

Somewhere in 1896, Pleske suffered from the pressures of the reconstruction and resigned. V. V. Zalensky was made director of the museum and Pleske. He also officially resigned from the Academy of Sciences on 2 October 1896. Pleske had a conflict with Andrei Petrovich Semenov (or Semenov-Tian-Shansky) which may also have precipitated his resignation. Following the Russian revolution, many wealthy people had to seek work again. In 1918, Pleske applied for work at the museum and he chose not to work with birds due to potential exposure to arsenic and instead began to work on insects. He worked on the Stratiomyiidae. In 1919, he again work on birds, examining the material from the Russian polar expedition of 1900–1902.

After the death of V. L. Bianchi in 1920 he was made head of the Department of Ornithology. When P. P. Sushkin joined in 1921, he moved back to study Diptera. He also began to work on the organization of library. In 1928 he described Omissus after findings made on the Murmansk coast. In 1932, Pleske may have been arrested as his name was repressed from the members of the Academy of Sciences. The reasons are unknown. He died on 1 August 1932, and was buried in the Smolensky Lutheran Cemetery in St. Petersburg.

== Sources ==
- "Плеске, Федор Дмитриевич" . Brockhaus and Efron Encyclopedic Dictionary (in Russian). 1906.
