= Old German Owl pigeon =

Breed of pigeon

Old German Owl
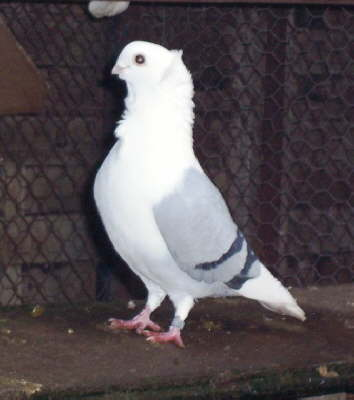
- Old German Owl
- Conservation status: Common
- Other names: Altdeutsches Mövchen
- Country of origin: Germany

Classification
- US Breed Group: Fancy
- EE Breed Group: Owl pigeons

The Old German Owl (Columba livia domestica) is an elegant and distinctive breed of fancy pigeon, and the originator of the short faced German Shield Owls. It was the first breed in Germany to be called Mövchen or "little gull" due to its resemblance to the European Herring Gull in color and patterns. The breed was again formally recognized in Germany in 1956, but the first official standard was not adopted in Europe until 1960. The standard was adopted by the National Pigeon Association of America in 1999.

== Gallery ==
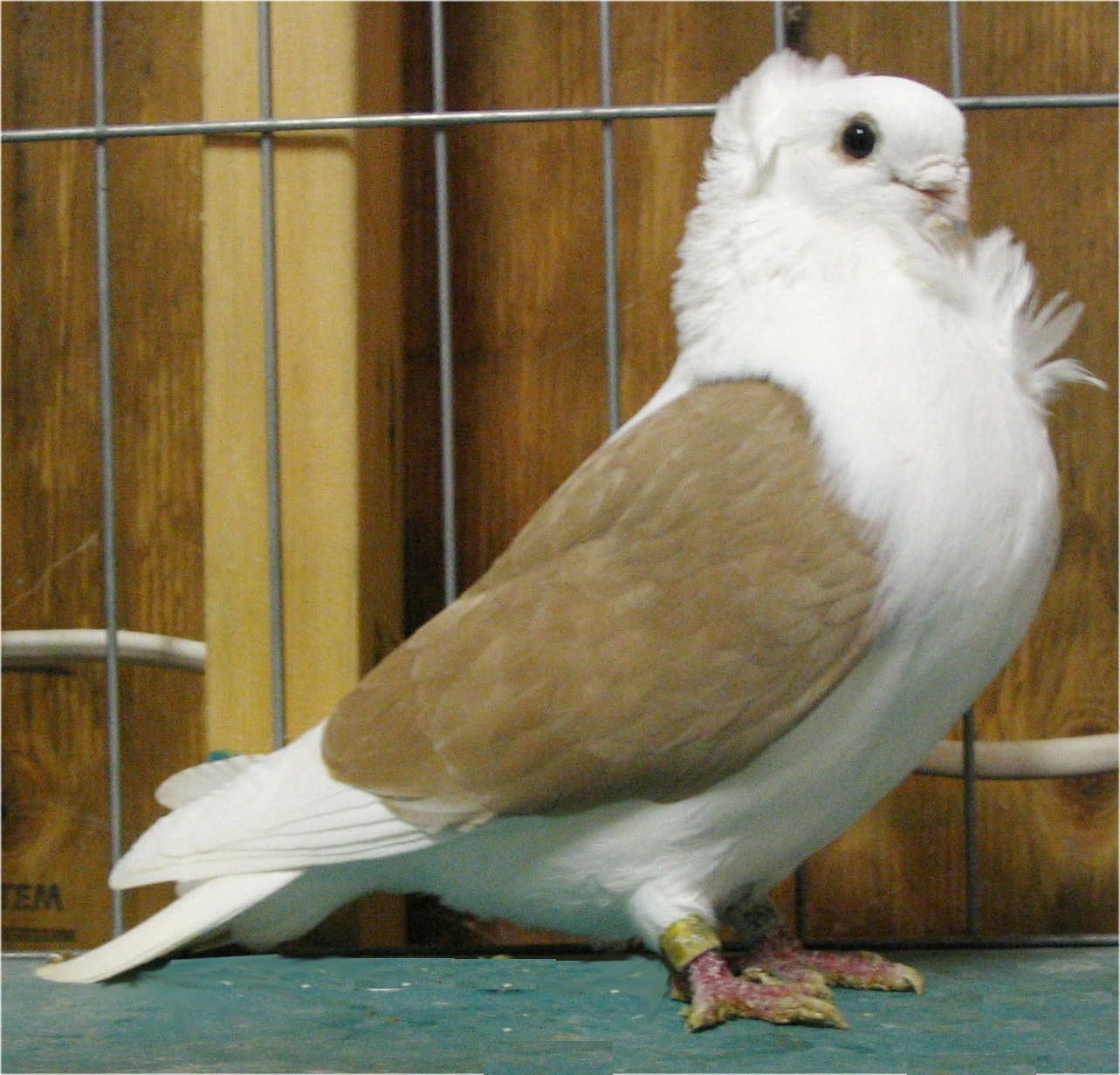
Yellow Old German Owl

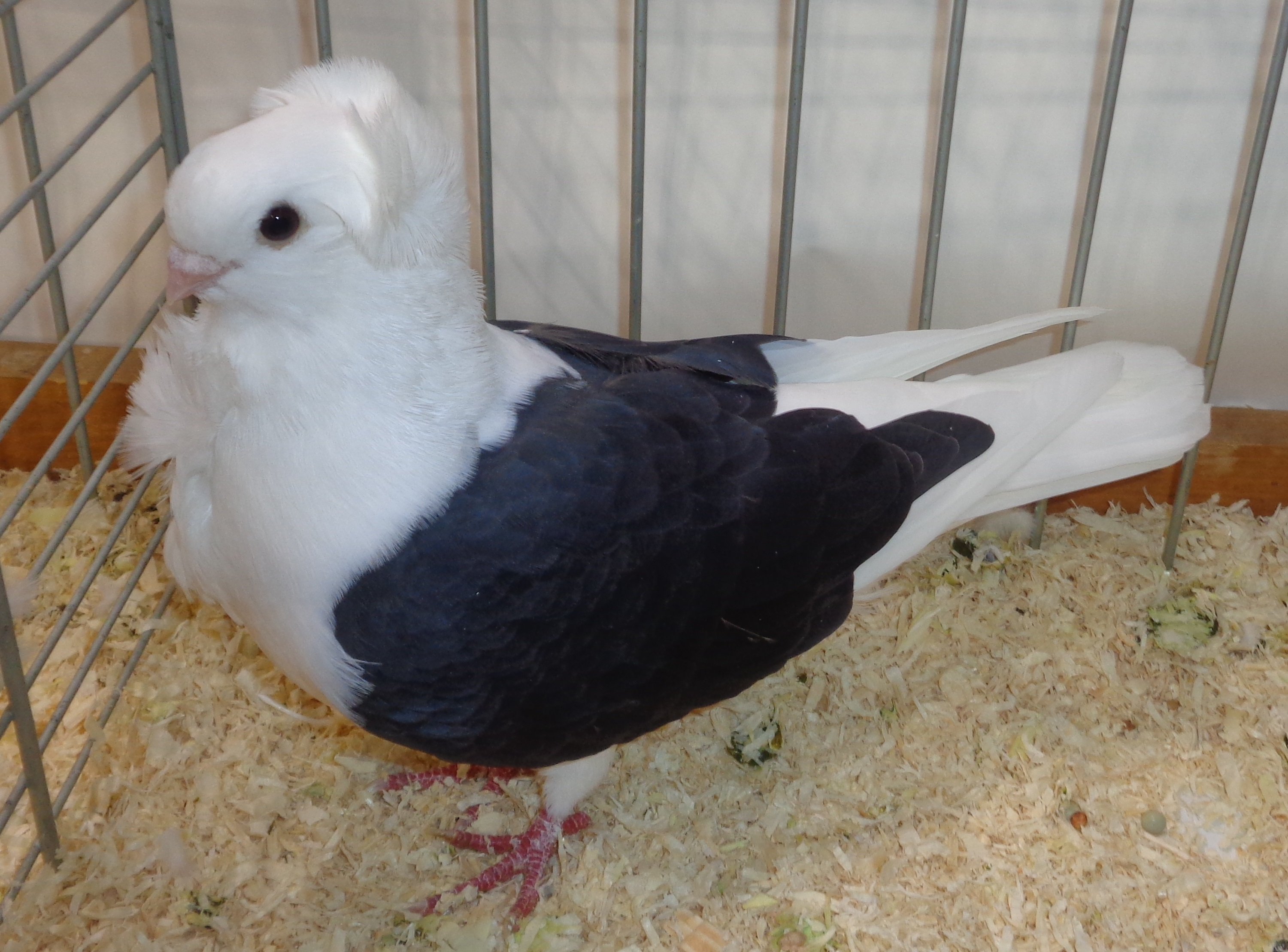
Black Old German Owl

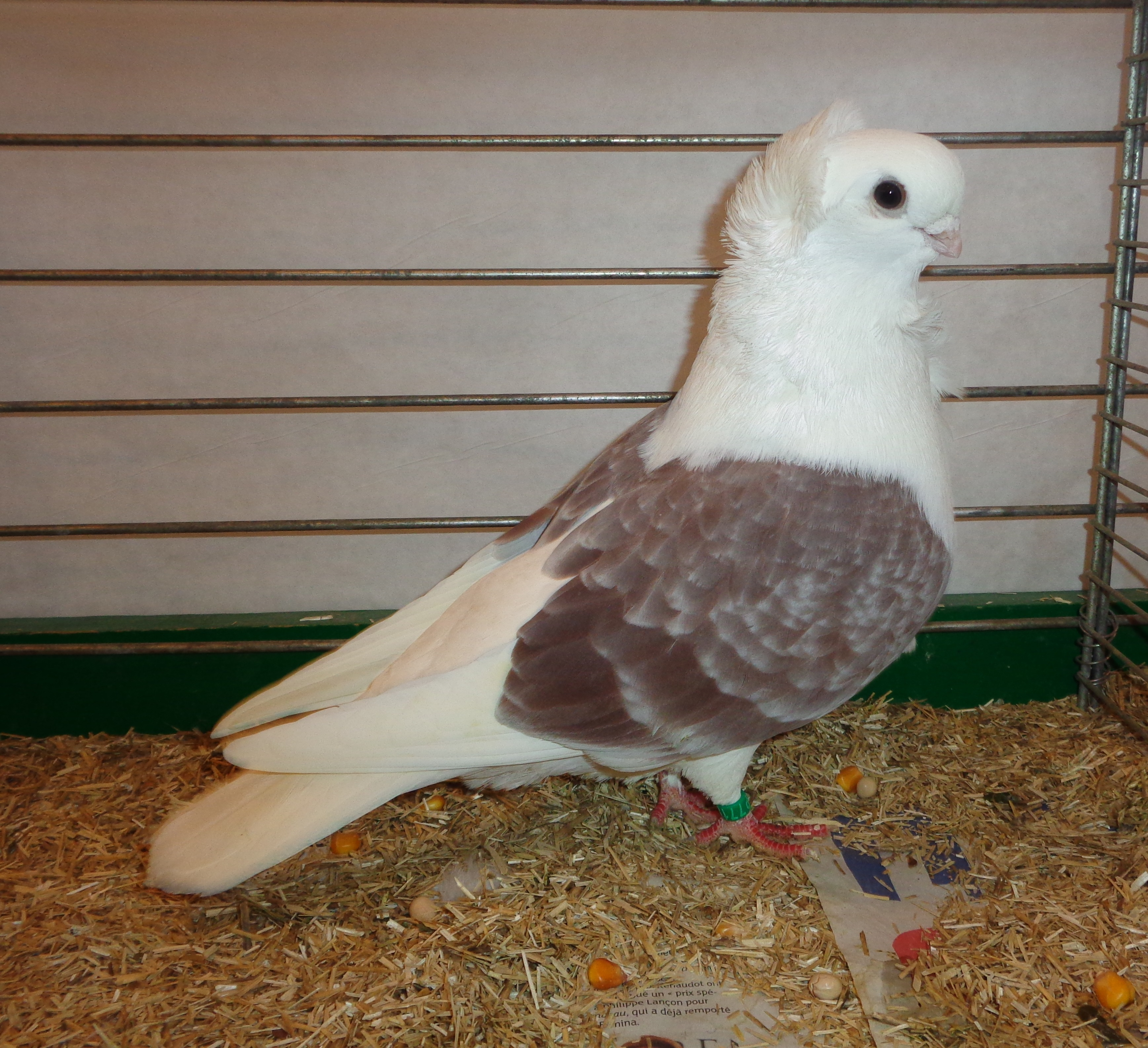
Red Check Old German Owl

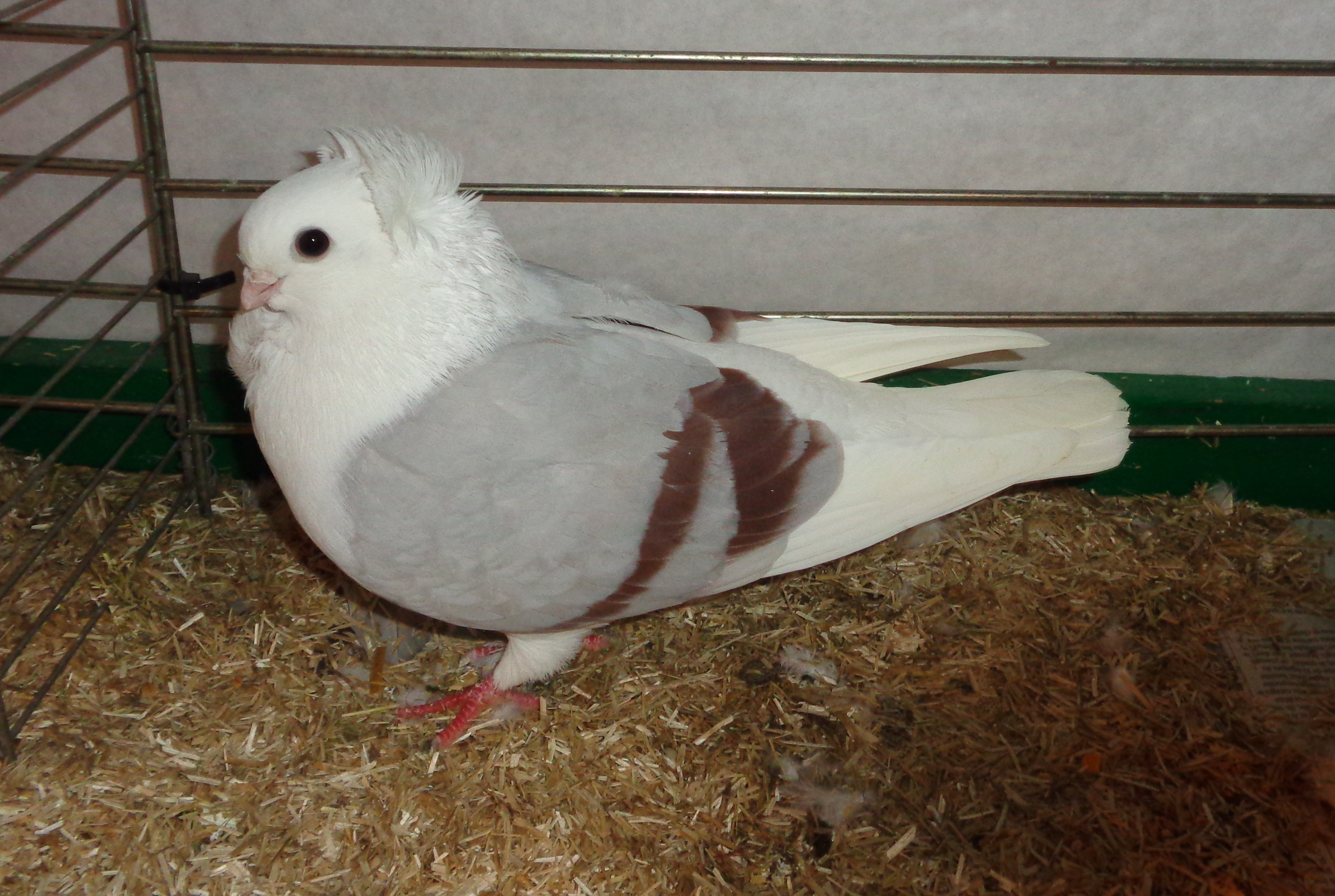
Red Bar Old German Owl

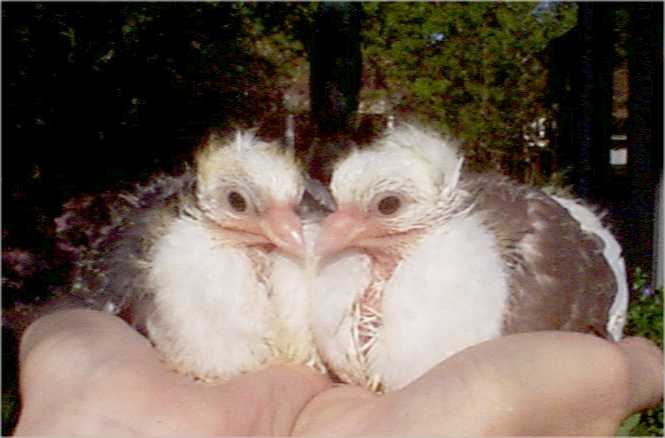
14 days old

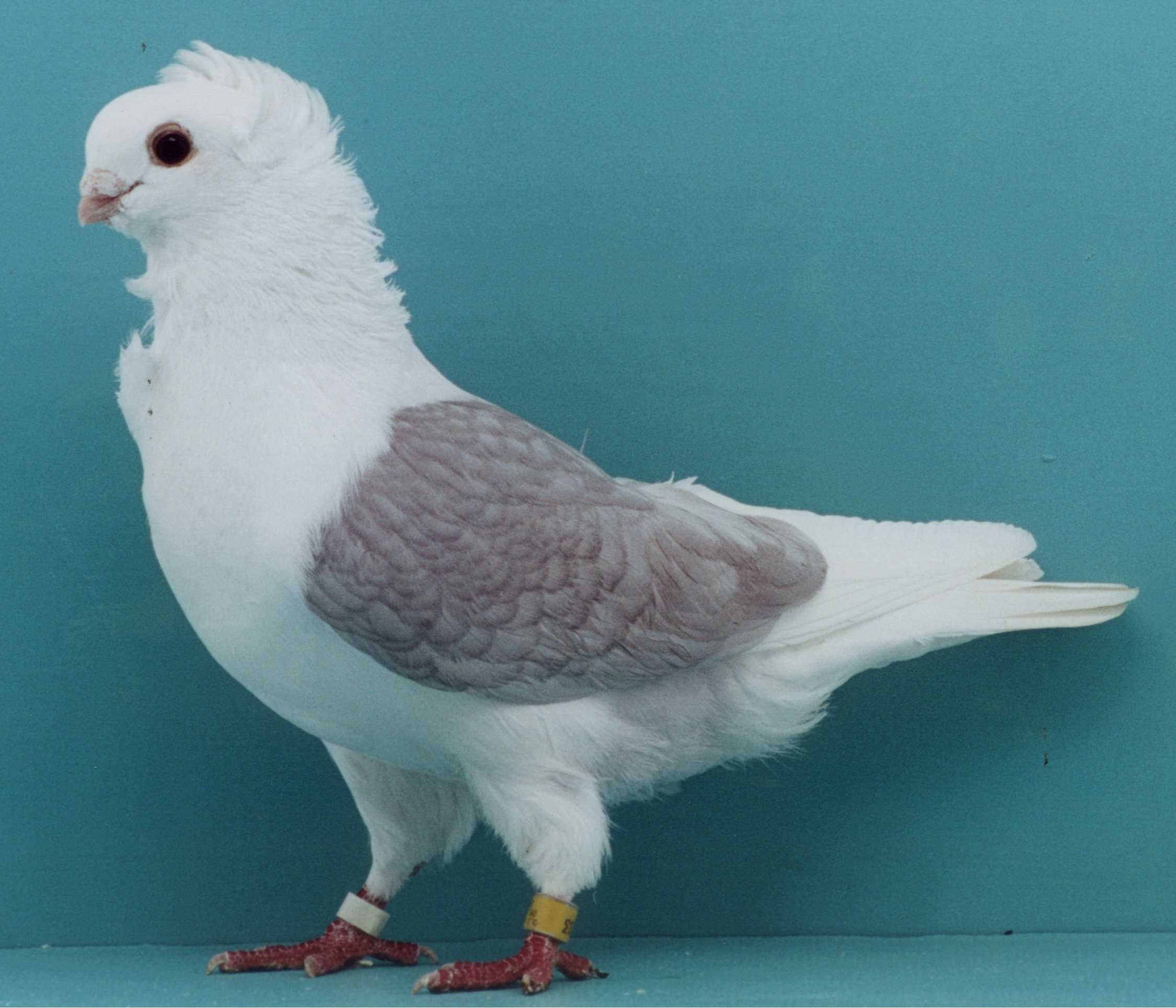
Silver NPA Champion

== Standard ==
- Origin:
- General characteristics:
- Element characteristics:
  - Head: Nearly round, broad, with a well arched forehead and a small full shell crest, closing with rosettes.
  - Eyes: Large, bright and lively bull eyes. Cere is light and delicate.
  - Beak: Medium length, broad, light flesh color. The wattle is small and undeveloped.
  - Neck: Short, stocky, held up, slanting slightly backwards and upright. The throat has a slight dewlap and a well-developed frill.
  - Breast: Broad, well rounded and held forward prominently.
  - Back: Broad in the shoulders, becoming narrower toward the tail, and sloping downward.
  - Wings: Lying close to the body, covering the back, and resting on the tail.
  - Tail: Held tightly together, short.
  - Legs: Short, shanks are scarcely visible. The feet and toes are never feathered.
  - Feathers: Well developed, lying tightly against the body.
- Current available colors and patterns: Blue, ash red, recessive red, brown, spread, checks, and bars in black, red, brown and white and dilutes of these base colors.. Self white and red.
- Colors and markings: All colors are to be as smooth, clear, and saturated as possible. The body color is pure white. The shield marked variety ideally has 10 white flight feathers with colored thumb feathers. The tail marked variety is pure white except for the colored tail feathers which include a wedge-shaped portion of the back and body under the tail.
- Undesirable elements: Long body or long feathers; narrow, flat, long or angular head; skimpy, crooked, or too low set crest; missing rosettes; heavy, smudged, uneven bars or checks, long thin beak, coarse or dark eye ceres, missing frill, narrow breast, drooping wings, too upright a station, poor (unsaturated) color, noticeably colored thighs, colored feathers on the head or body, if shield marked, white feathers in shield, uneven, unsymmetrical, incomplete shields, white thumb feathers, if tail marked, white or faulty tail feathers, white plumage under tail area.
- Order of rating: Overall impression, body form, head and beak, crest, neck and frill, color and markings.

== See also ==
- List of pigeon breeds
- Pigeon keeping
