= Carabus alexandrae =

Scientific classification
- Kingdom: Animalia
- Phylum: Arthropoda
- Class: Insecta
- Order: Coleoptera
- Suborder: Adephaga
- Family: Carabidae
- Genus: Carabus
- Species: C. alexandrae

Binomial name
- Carabus alexandrae Semenov, 1887

Species of beetle

Carabus alexandrae is a species of black coloured ground beetle from Carabinae subfamily, that is endemic to Gansu, China.

== Subspecies ==
The species have 3 subspecies all of which could be found in Gansu Province of China:

- Carabus alexandrae alexandrae Semenov, 1887
- Carabus alexandrae cratocephaloides Semenov, 1887
- Carabus alexandrae subidolon Deuve, 1994
