= Carabus alexandrae cratocephaloides =

Scientific classification
- Kingdom: Animalia
- Phylum: Arthropoda
- Class: Insecta
- Order: Coleoptera
- Suborder: Adephaga
- Family: Carabidae
- Genus: Carabus
- Species: C. alexandrae
- Subspecies: C. a. cratocephaloides

Trinomial name
- Carabus alexandrae cratocephaloides Semenov, 1887

Subspecies of beetle

Carabus alexandrae cratocephaloides is a subspecies of black coloured beetle in the family Carabidae that is endemic to Gansu, China. The females of the subspecies are, on average, approximately 28 millimetres (1.1 in) long.
