= Carabus exiguus =

Scientific classification
- Kingdom: Animalia
- Phylum: Arthropoda
- Class: Insecta
- Order: Coleoptera
- Suborder: Adephaga
- Family: Carabidae
- Genus: Carabus
- Species: C. exiguus

Binomial name
- Carabus exiguus Semenov, 1898

Species of beetle

Carabus exiguus is a species of black-coloured ground beetle in the Carabinae subfamily that is endemic to China.

== Subspecies ==
The species have 10 subspecies, all of which could be found in China:

- Carabus exiguus absconditus Imura, 2002
- Carabus exiguus cithara Cavazzuti, 2002
- Carabus exiguus evae Brezina et Hackel, 2007
- Carabus exiguus exiguus Semenov, 1898
- Carabus exiguus fanianus Imura, 1993
- Carabus exiguus lanzhouicus Deuve, 1989
- Carabus exiguus nivium Breuning, 1933
- Carabus exiguus ochotonarum Brezina, 1996
- Carabus exiguus tagong Kleinfeld & Puchner, 2007
- Carabus exiguus wudumontanus Imura, 1998
