= Phytoecia elyandti =

Scientific classification
- Domain: Eukaryota
- Kingdom: Animalia
- Phylum: Arthropoda
- Class: Insecta
- Order: Coleoptera
- Suborder: Polyphaga
- Infraorder: Cucujiformia
- Family: Cerambycidae
- Genus: Phytoecia
- Species: P. elyandti

Binomial name
- Phytoecia elyandti Semenov-Tian-Shanskij, 1891

Synonyms
- Coptosia elyandti (Semenov-Tian-Shanskij, 1891); Phytoecia glasunovi Semenov-Tian-Shanskij, 1895

Species of beetle

Phytoecia elyandti is a species of beetle in the family Cerambycidae. It was described by Semenov-Tian-Shanskij in 1891. It is known from Turkmenistan, Kyrgyzstan, Tajikistan, Kazakhstan, and Uzbekistan.
