= Carabus exiguus exiguus =

Scientific classification
- Kingdom: Animalia
- Phylum: Arthropoda
- Class: Insecta
- Order: Coleoptera
- Suborder: Adephaga
- Family: Carabidae
- Genus: Carabus
- Species: C. exiguus
- Subspecies: C. e. exiguus

Trinomial name
- Carabus exiguus exiguus Semenov, 1898

Subspecies of beetle

Carabus exiguus exiguus is a black-coloured subspecies of ground beetle in the Carabinae subfamily that is endemic to Sichuan, China.
