= Carabus alexandrae alexandrae =

Scientific classification
- Kingdom: Animalia
- Phylum: Arthropoda
- Class: Insecta
- Order: Coleoptera
- Suborder: Adephaga
- Family: Carabidae
- Genus: Carabus
- Species: C. alexandrae
- Subspecies: C. a. alexandrae

Trinomial name
- Carabus alexandrae alexandrae Semenov, 1887

Subspecies of beetle

Carabus alexandrae alexandrae is a subspecies of black coloured beetle from family Carabidae, that is endemic to Gansu, China. The females of the subspecies are 24 millimetres (0.94 in) long.
