= Carabus alajensis =

Scientific classification
- Domain: Eukaryota
- Kingdom: Animalia
- Phylum: Arthropoda
- Class: Insecta
- Order: Coleoptera
- Suborder: Adephaga
- Family: Carabidae
- Genus: Carabus
- Species: C. alajensis

Binomial name
- Carabus alajensis Semenov, 1896

Species of beetle

Carabus alajensis is a species of either black- or brown-coloured ground beetle from family Carabidae, endemic to Kyrgyzstan.
