= Carabus exiguus evae =

Scientific classification
- Kingdom: Animalia
- Phylum: Arthropoda
- Class: Insecta
- Order: Coleoptera
- Suborder: Adephaga
- Family: Carabidae
- Genus: Carabus
- Species: C. exiguus
- Subspecies: C. e. evae

Trinomial name
- Carabus exiguus evae Brezina & Hackel, 2007

Subspecies of beetle

Carabus exiguus evae is a black-coloured subspecies of ground beetle in the subfamily Carabinae that is endemic to Qinghai, China.
