= Carabus exiguus fanianus =

Scientific classification
- Kingdom: Animalia
- Phylum: Arthropoda
- Class: Insecta
- Order: Coleoptera
- Suborder: Adephaga
- Family: Carabidae
- Genus: Carabus
- Species: C. exiguus
- Subspecies: C. e. fanianus

Trinomial name
- Carabus exiguus fanianus Imura, 1993

Subspecies of beetle

Carabus exiguus fanianus is a bronze-coloured subspecies of ground beetle in the subfamily Carabinae that is endemic to Shaanxi, China.
