= Carabus alexandrae subidolon =

Scientific classification
- Kingdom: Animalia
- Phylum: Arthropoda
- Class: Insecta
- Order: Coleoptera
- Suborder: Adephaga
- Family: Carabidae
- Genus: Carabus
- Species: C. alexandrae
- Subspecies: C. a. subidolon

Trinomial name
- Carabus alexandrae subidolon Deuve, 1994

Subspecies of beetle

Carabus alexandrae subidolon is a subspecies of beetle in the family Carabidae that is endemic to Gansu, China.
