= Omissus =

Variant of European herring gull

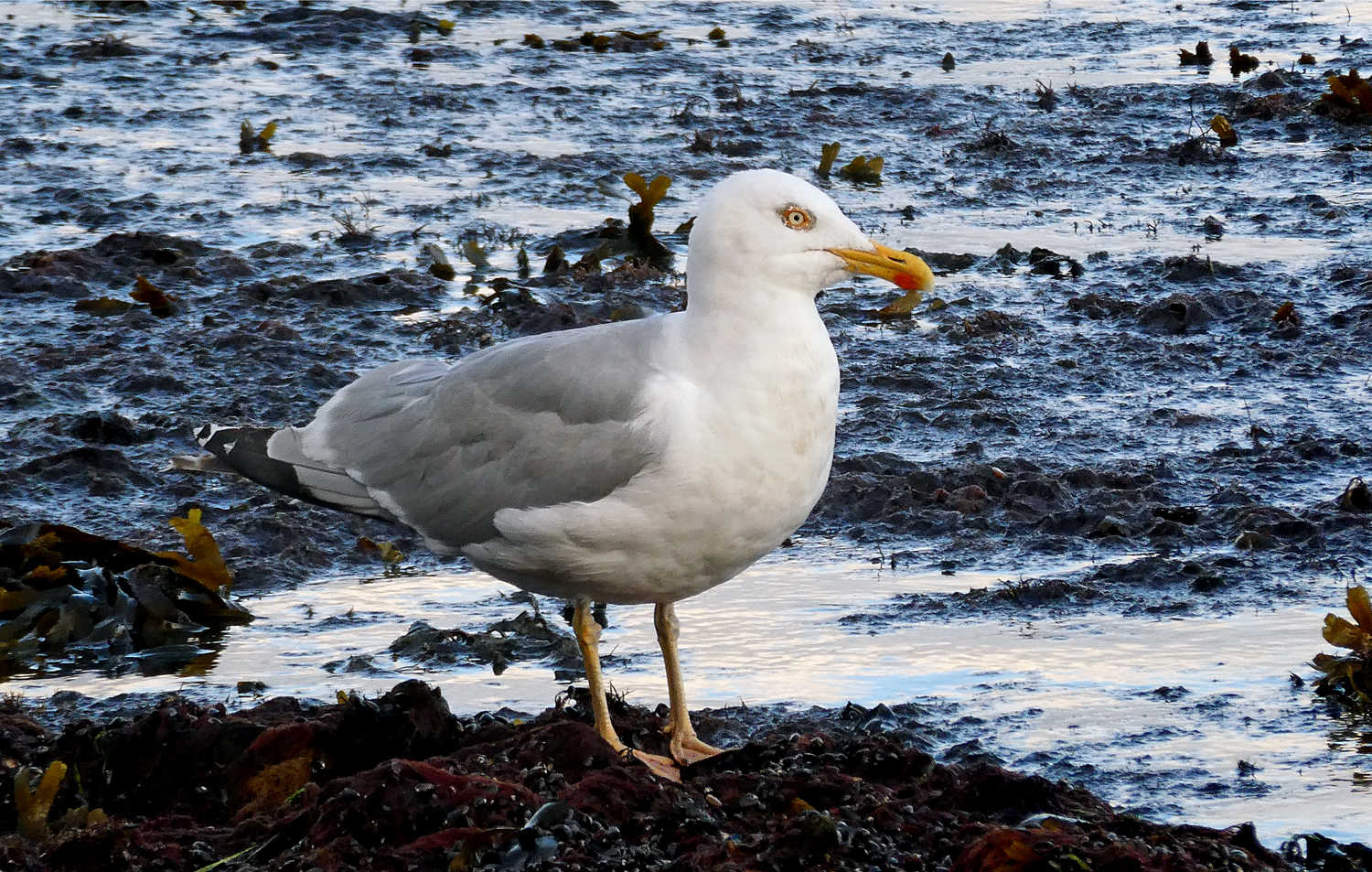
European herring gull of the omissus variant in Ystad 2020.

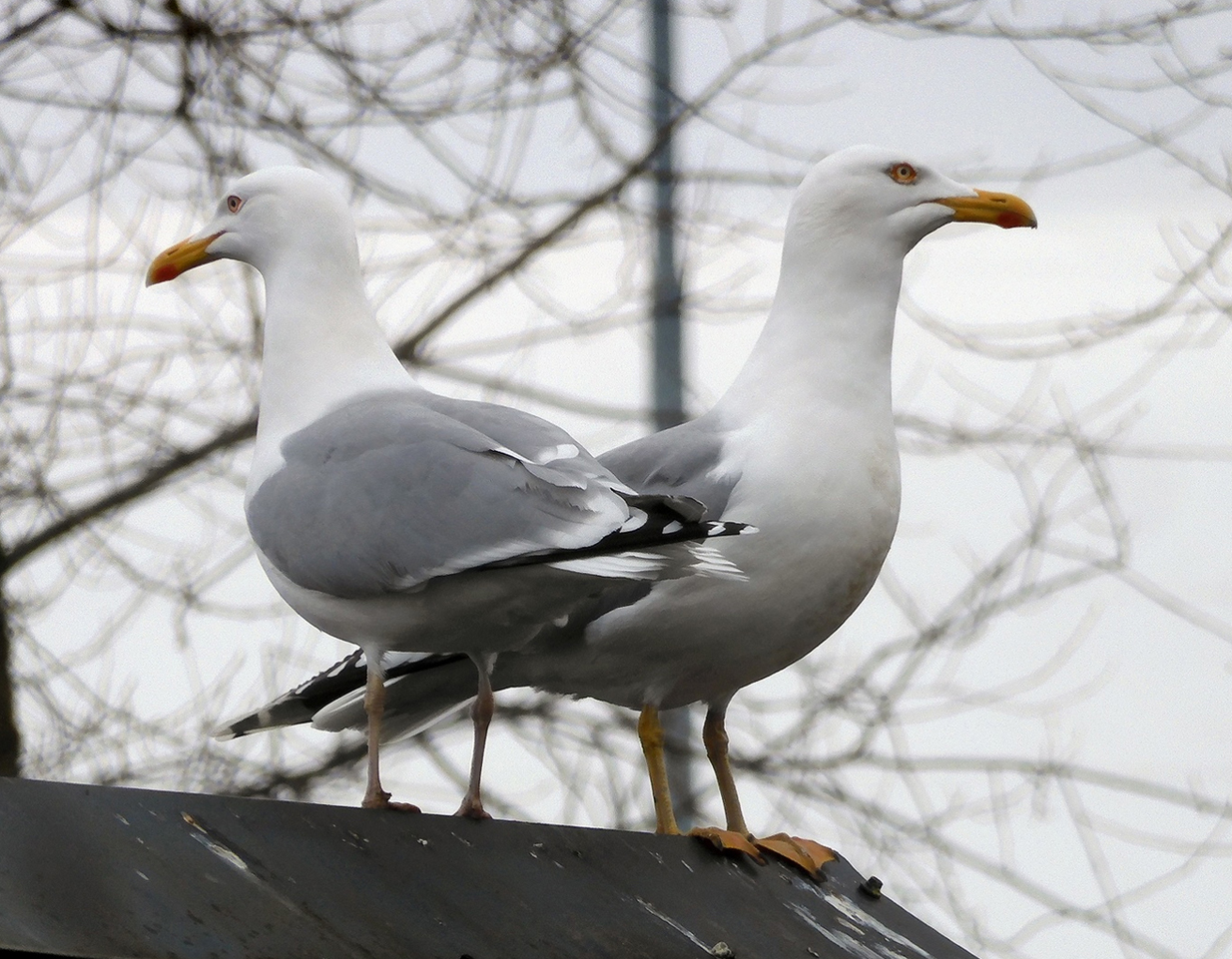
An adult pair, where the one on the right is an Omissus.

Omissus is a variant of the European herring gull. It is largely similar to a common herring gull, but unlike the common species, it has yellow legs.

There is very little research and documentation about the omissus variant, some authors believe that it may be a species of its own.

Omissus can be confused with the yellow-legged gull, but the omissus does not have as distinctly bright yellow legs as the yellow-legged gull.

Omissus was first described in 1928 by the Russian ornithologist Theodor Pleske.
