= Carabus exiguus cithara =

Scientific classification
- Kingdom: Animalia
- Phylum: Arthropoda
- Class: Insecta
- Order: Coleoptera
- Suborder: Adephaga
- Family: Carabidae
- Genus: Carabus
- Species: C. exiguus
- Subspecies: C. e. cithara

Trinomial name
- Carabus exiguus cithara Cavazzuti, 2002

Subspecies of beetle

Carabus exiguus cithara is a black coloured subspecies of ground beetle in the subfamily Carabinae that is endemic to Sichuan, China.
