= Carabus exiguus nivium =

Scientific classification
- Kingdom: Animalia
- Phylum: Arthropoda
- Class: Insecta
- Order: Coleoptera
- Suborder: Adephaga
- Family: Carabidae
- Genus: Carabus
- Species: C. exiguus
- Subspecies: C. e. nivium

Trinomial name
- Carabus exiguus nivium Breuning, 1933

Subspecies of beetle

Carabus exiguus nivium is a black-coloured subspecies of ground beetle in the subfamily Carabinae that is endemic to Sichuan, China.
