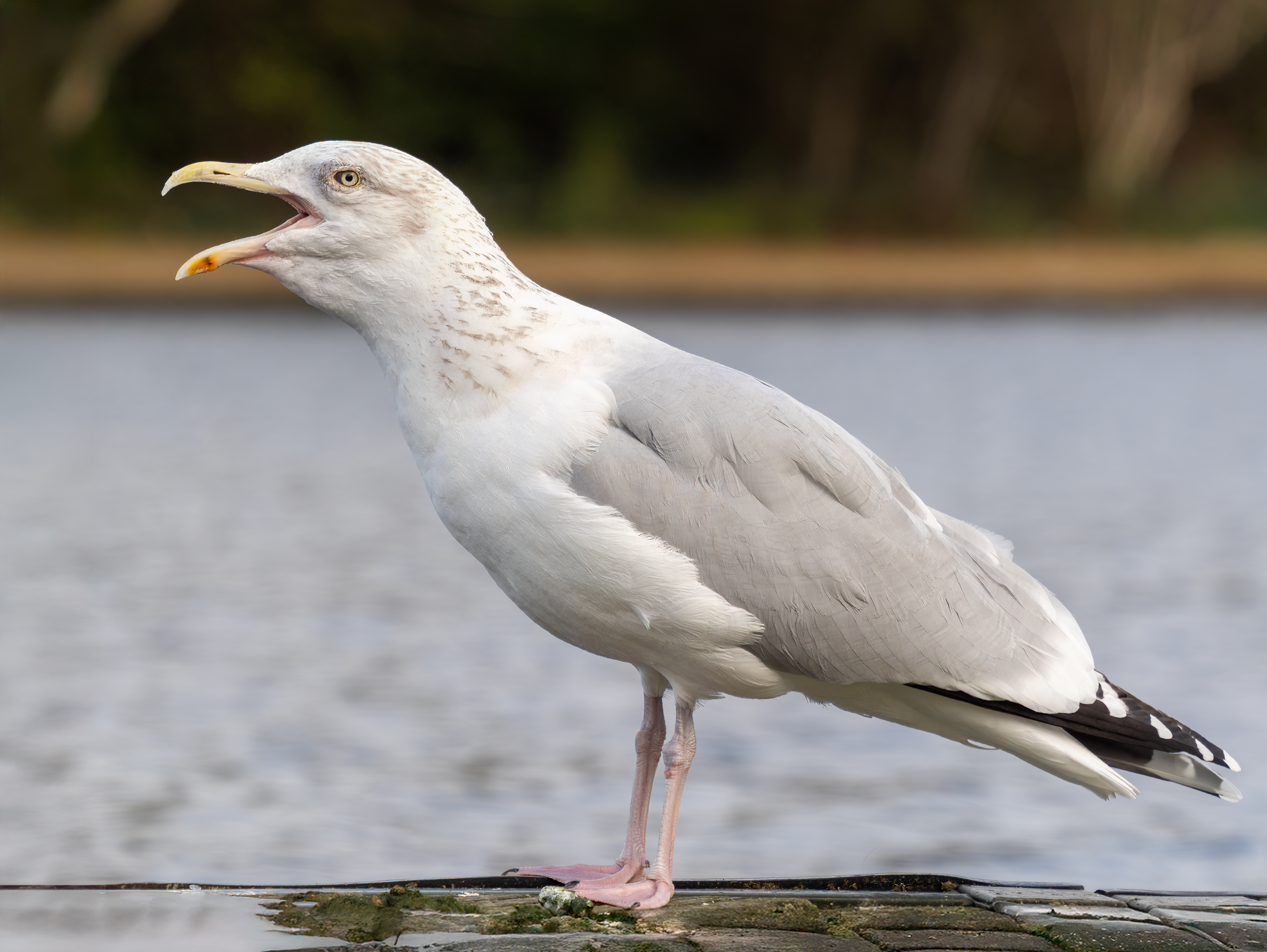
- Winter-plumaged adult, London
- Sound

Conservation status
- Least Concern (IUCN 3.1)

Scientific classification
- Kingdom: Animalia
- Phylum: Chordata
- Class: Aves
- Order: Charadriiformes
- Family: Laridae
- Genus: Larus
- Species: L. argentatus

Binomial name
- Larus argentatus Pontoppidan, 1763
- Range of L. argentatus Breeding range Year-round range Wintering range

Audio

= European herring gull =

Species of bird

The European herring gull or simply herring gull (Larus argentatus) is a large gull, up to 66 cm (26 in) long. It breeds throughout the northern and western coasts of Europe. Some European herring gulls, especially those resident in colder areas, migrate farther south in winter, but many are permanent residents, such as in Ireland, Britain, Iceland, or on the North Sea shores. They have a varied diet, including fish, crustaceans, as well as some plants, and are also scavengers, consuming carrion and food left by or stolen from humans.

== Taxonomy ==
The herring gull's scientific name is from Latin. Larus appears to have referred to a gull or other large seabird and argentatus means decorated with silver.

This species group has a ring distribution around the Northern Hemisphere. Most adjacent populations interbreed; however, adjacent terminal populations do not.

The Association of European Rarities Committees recognises six species:

- European herring gull, L. argentatus
- American herring gull, L. smithsonianus
- Caspian gull, L. cachinnans
- Yellow-legged gull, L. michahellis
- Vega gull, L. vegae
- Armenian gull, L. armenicus

=== Subspecies ===
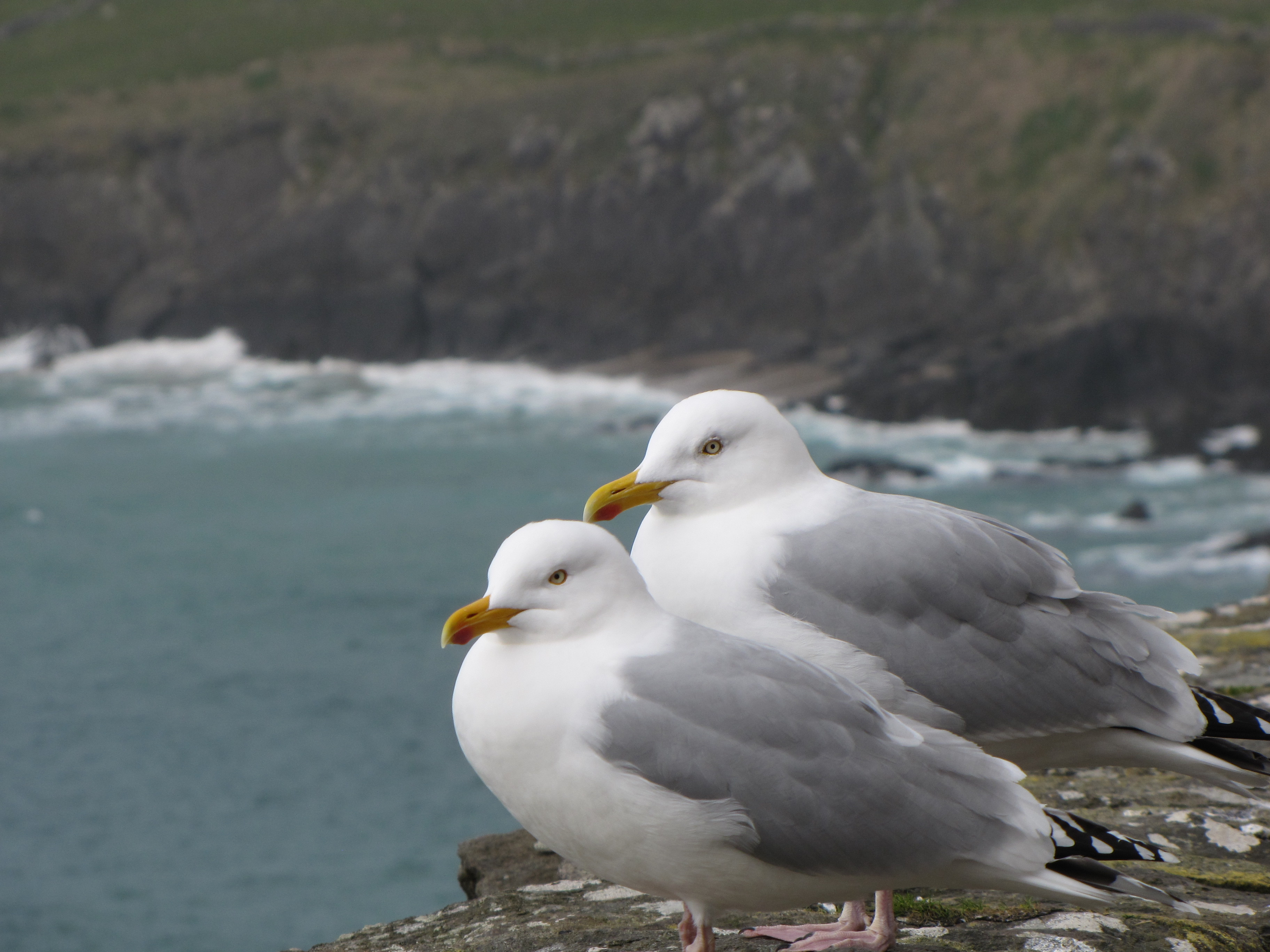
Two L. a. argenteus individuals on the shore of Coumeenoole Bay, Ireland

- L. a. argentatus – Pontoppidan, 1763, the nominate form, sometimes known as the Scandinavian herring gull, breeds in Scandinavia and northwestern Russia. Northern and eastern populations migrate southwest in winter. It is a large, bulky gull with extensive white in the wingtips. The outermost primary, p10 often has a large white spot (called a mirror) that extends to the wingtip. The bill is longer and forehead flatter than argenteus.
- L. a. argenteus – Brehm & Schilling, 1822, sometimes known as the Western European herring gull breeds in Western Europe in Iceland, the Faroes, Britain, Ireland, France, Belgium, the Netherlands and Germany. Many birds are resident while others make short-distance migratory journeys. It is smaller than L. a. argentatus with more black and less white in the wingtips (p10 mirror is distinct from the white wingtip spot) and paler upper parts.

These taxa are classified as subspecies of Larus argentatus by some authorities such as the Handbook of the Birds of the World. Others such as the Association of European Rarities Committees, British Ornithologists' Union, American Ornithological Society and the International Ornithological Union now regard them as one or two separate species.

- L. (a.) smithsonianus, the American herring gull, breeds in Alaska, Canada, and the Northeast United States. Many birds migrate southwards in winter, reaching as far as Central America and the West Indies. Immature birds tend to be darker and more uniformly brown than European herring gulls and have a dark tail.
- L. (a.) vegae, the Vega gull, breeds in northeastern Siberia. It winters in Japan, Korea, eastern China, and Taiwan.

Several other gulls have been included in this species in the past, but are now normally considered separate, e.g. the yellow-legged gull (L. michahellis), the Caspian gull (L. cachinnans), the Armenian gull (L. armenicus) and Heuglin's gull (L. heuglini).

== Description ==
The male European herring gull is 60–67 cm (24–26 in) long and weighs 1,050–1,525 g (2.315–3.362 lb), while the female is 55–62 cm (22–24 in) and weighs 710–1,100 g (1.57–2.43 lb). The wingspan can range from 125 to 155 cm (49 to 61 in). Among standard measurements, the wing chord is 38 to 48 cm (15 to 19 in), the bill is 4.4 to 6.5 cm (1.7 to 2.6 in) and the tarsus is 5.3 to 7.5 cm (2.1 to 3.0 in). Adults in breeding plumage have a light grey back and upper wings and white head and underparts. The wingtips are black with white spots known as "mirrors". The bill is yellow with a red spot and a ring of bare yellow skin is seen around the pale eye. The legs are normally pink at all ages, but can be yellowish, particularly in the Baltic population, which was formerly regarded as a separate subspecies "L. a. omissus". Non-breeding adults have brown streaks on their heads and necks. Male and female plumage are identical at all stages of development, but adult males are often larger.

Juvenile and first-winter birds are mainly brown with darker streaks and have a dark bill and eyes. Second-winter birds have a whiter head and underparts with less streaking and the back is grey. Third-winter individuals are similar to adults, but retain some of the features of immature birds such as brown feathers in the wings and dark markings on the bill. The European herring gull attains adult plumage and reaches sexual maturity at an average age of four years.

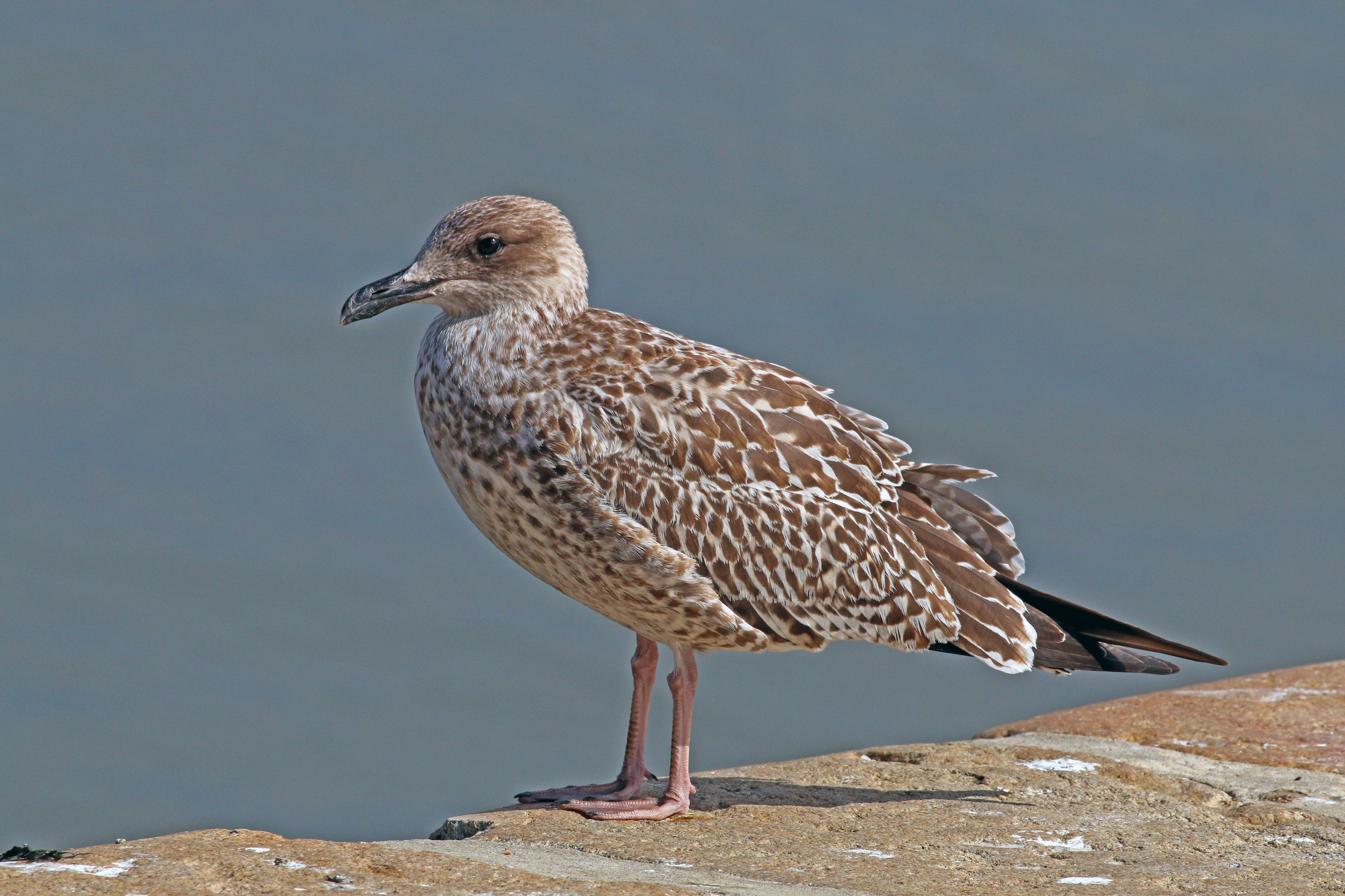
Juvenile, Portugal

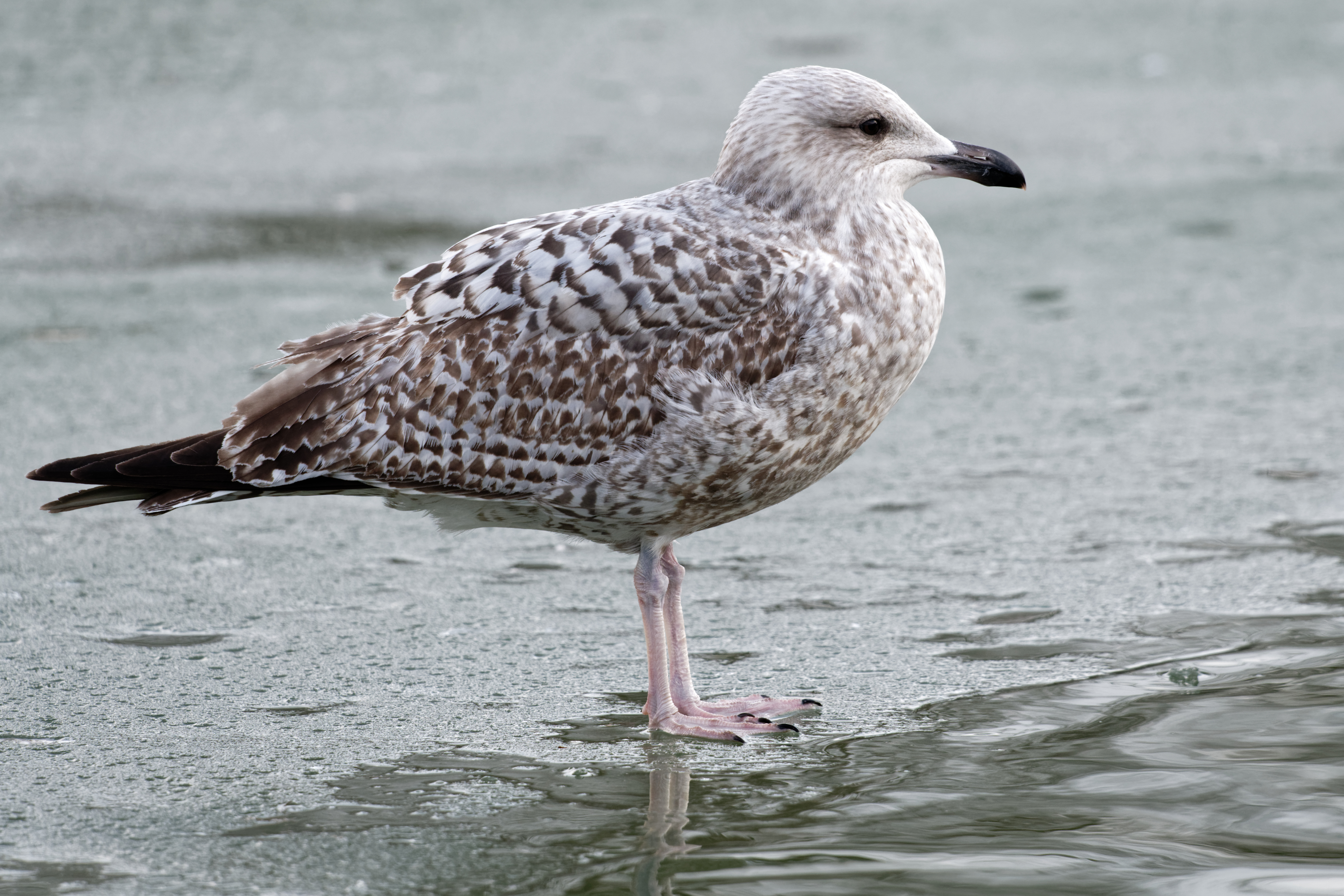
First winter plumage

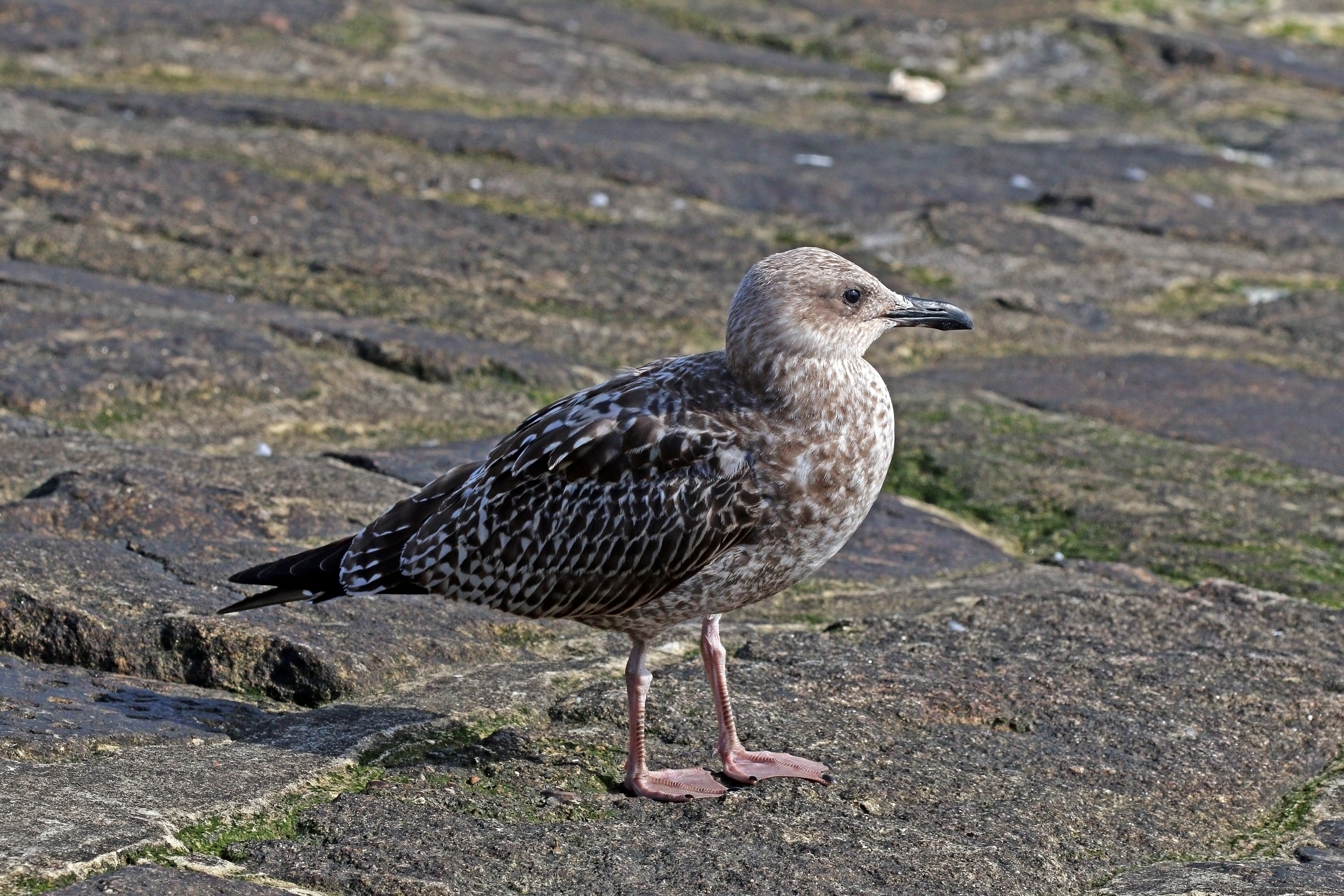
Second winter

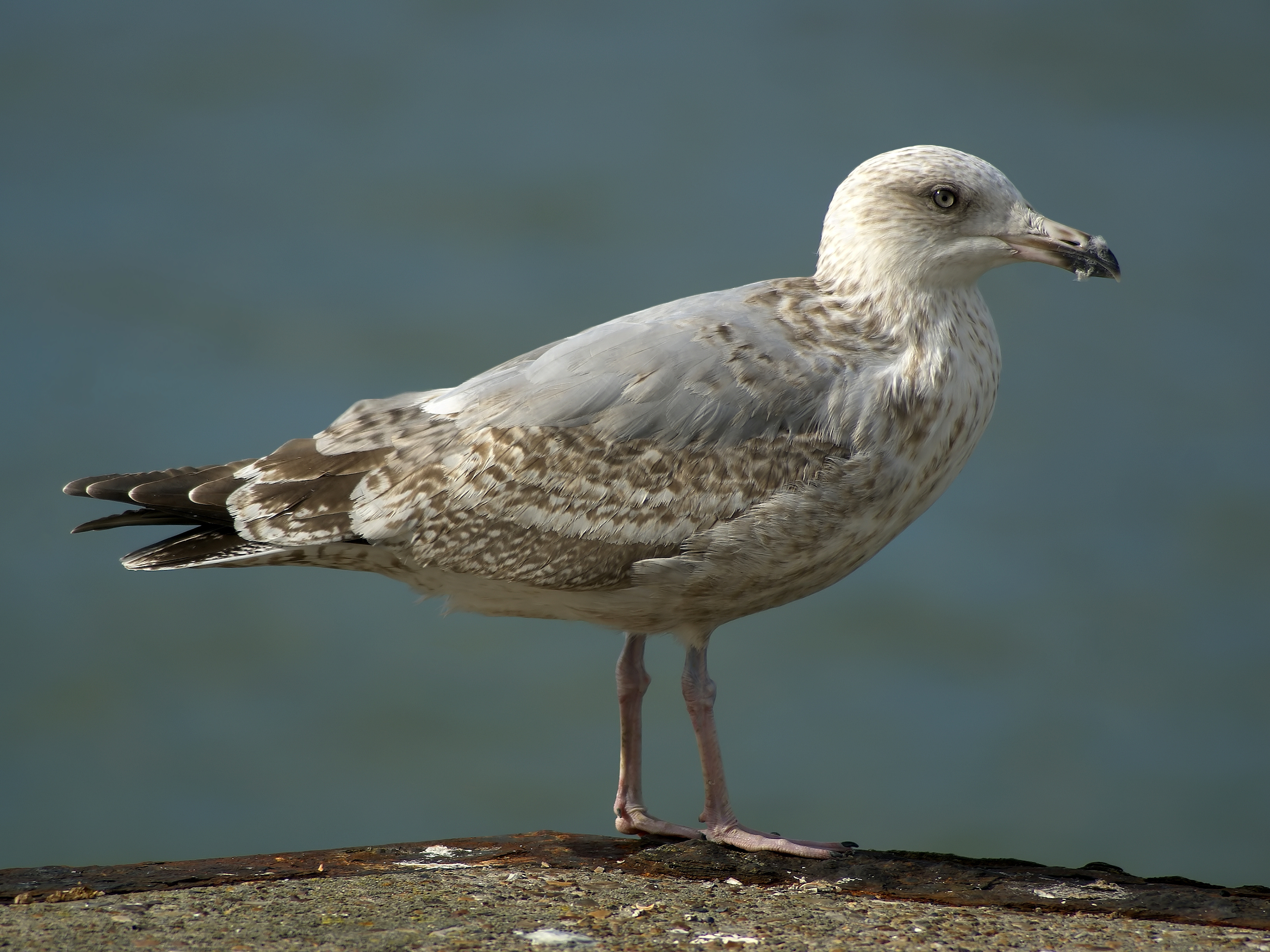
Sub-adult (third winter)

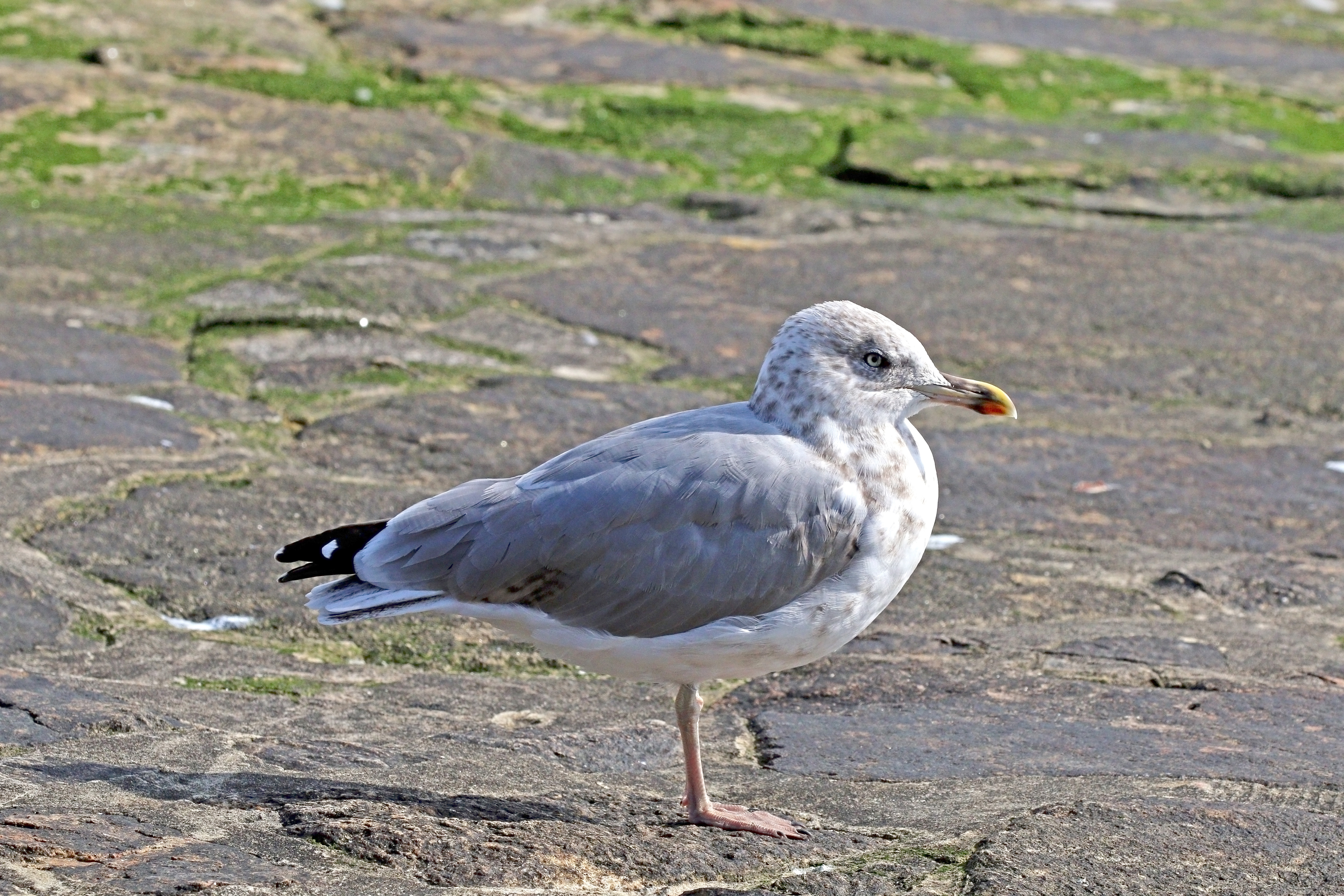
Sub-adult (third or fourth winter), Portugal

=== Yellow-legged variety ===
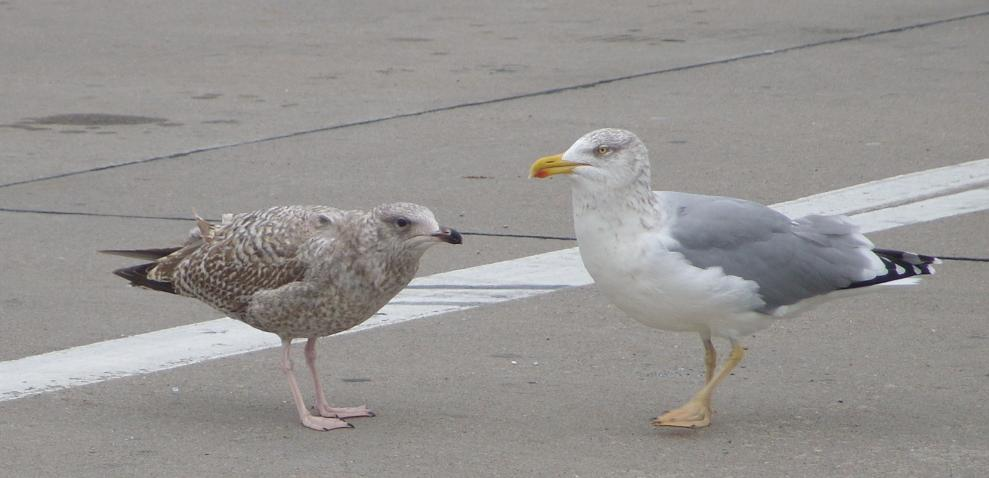
Adult L. argentatus with yellow legs to the right. Its offspring at left has the normal pink colour. This bird is not to be confused with the always yellow-legged Larus michahellis. Photo from Warnemünde (harbour of Rostock), Mecklenburg-Vorpommern, northern Germany.

At least in the south-west part of the Baltic Sea and surrounding areas, the European herring gull (L. argentatus) can be seen with yellow legs. They are not considered a subspecies, since they regularly breed with grey/flesh-coloured legged herring gulls. The offspring may have yellow or normal-coloured legs. They can be confused with the yellow-legged gull (L. michahellis), which are more common in the Mediterranean area, but single birds may reach more northern seas.

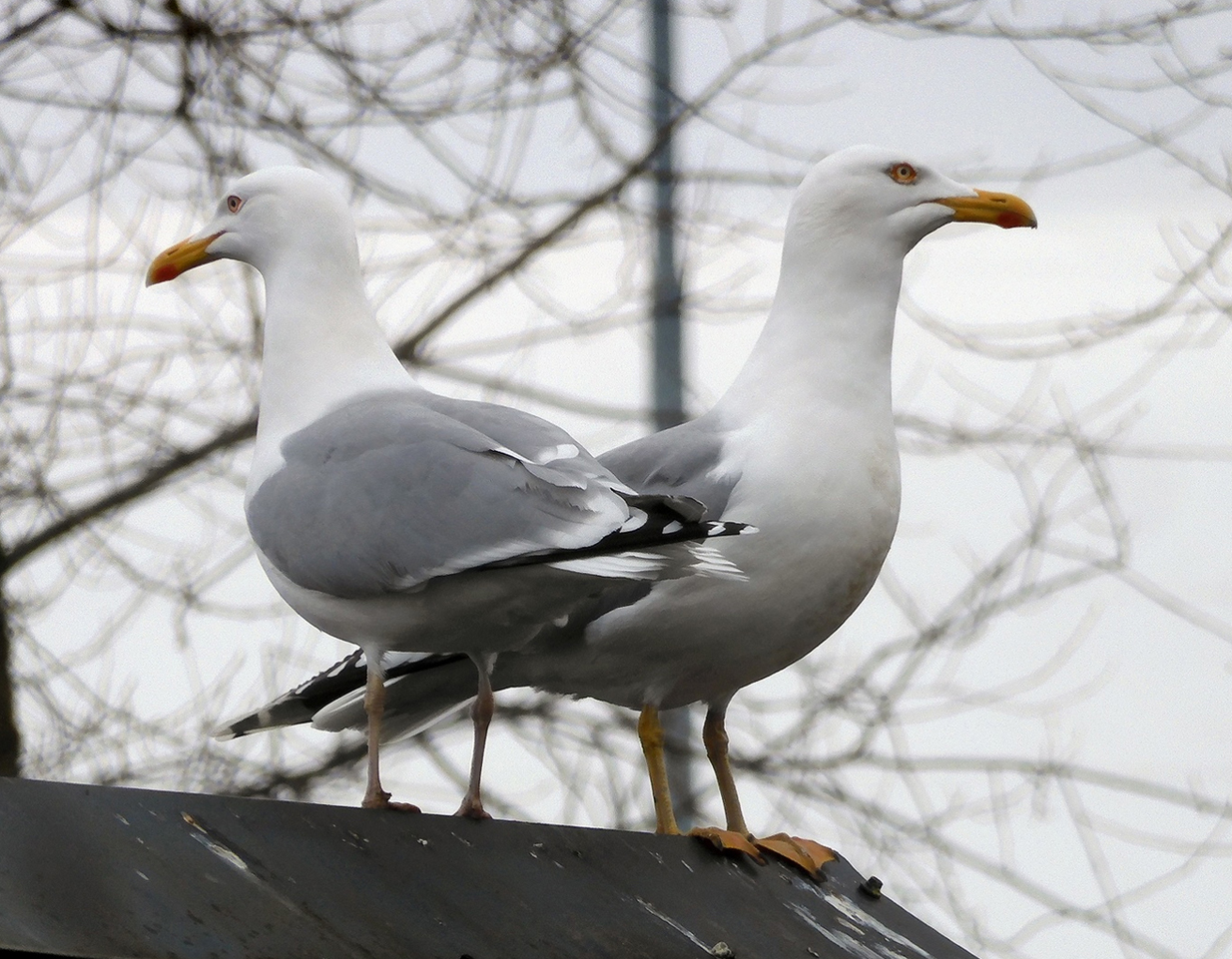
An adult pair; the one on the right is of the omissus variety.

=== Similar species ===
The European herring gull can be differentiated from the closely related, slightly smaller lesser black-backed gull by the latter's dark grey (not actually black) back and upper wing plumage and its yellow legs and feet. The two species occupy the same habitats and have overlapping ranges.

European herring gulls are much larger than ring-billed gulls, have pinkish legs, and a much thicker yellow bill with more pronounced gonys. First-winter European herring gulls are much browner, but second- and third-winter birds can be confusing since soft part colours are variable and third-year herring gull often show a ring around the bill. Such birds are most easily distinguished by the larger size and larger bill of European herring gull.

== Voice ==
Herring gulls are noisy, gregarious birds with distinctive vocalisations. Their loud, laughing call is particularly well known, and is often seen as a symbol of the seaside in countries such as the United Kingdom. The European herring gull also has a yelping alarm call and a low, barking anxiety call. The most distinct and best known call produced by European herring gulls – which is shared with their American relative – is the raucous territorial 'long call', used to signal boundaries to other birds; it is performed by the gull initially with its head bowed, then raised as the call continues.

European herring gull chicks and fledglings emit a distinctive, repetitive, high-pitched 'peep', accompanied by a head-flicking gesture when begging for food from or calling to their parents. Adult gulls in urban areas also exhibit this behaviour when fed by humans.

== Behaviour ==
European herring gull flocks have a loose pecking order, based on size, aggressiveness, and physical strength. Adult males are usually dominant over females and juveniles in feeding and boundary disputes, while adult females are typically dominant when selecting their nesting sites.

The European herring gull has long been believed to have extremely keen vision in daylight and night vision equal or superior to that of humans; however, this species is also capable of seeing ultraviolet light. This gull also appears to have excellent hearing and a sense of taste that is particularly responsive to salt and acidity.

Parasites of European herring gulls include the fluke Microphallus piriformes.

== Distribution ==
Herring gulls breed in much of north-western Europe, including Iceland, the United Kingdom, Ireland and France. Since 2009, herring gulls in the United Kingdom have been on the red list of birds of conservation concern.

They have been recorded from all the coasts of Europe including the Mediterranean and occasionally inland. Vagrants have been recorded in Israel, Cyprus and Turkey.

Birds in France are mainly resident, but northern populations migrate in winter, generally to the coasts of north-western Europe.

== Diet ==
Feeding behaviours of the European herring gull.

Stealing an egg from a common murre

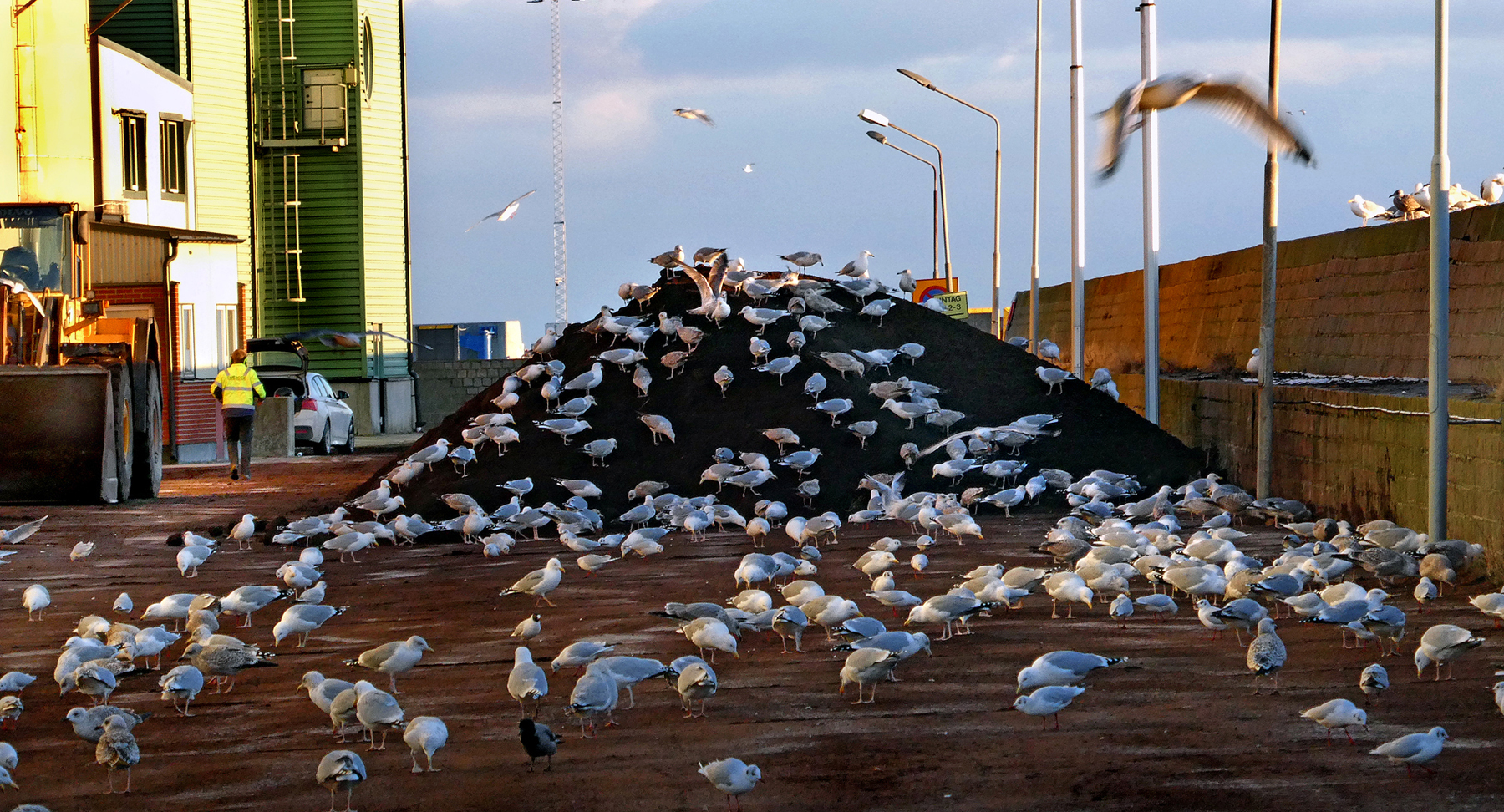
European herring gulls foraging in a pile of burnt grain at Lantmännens in Ystad 2021.

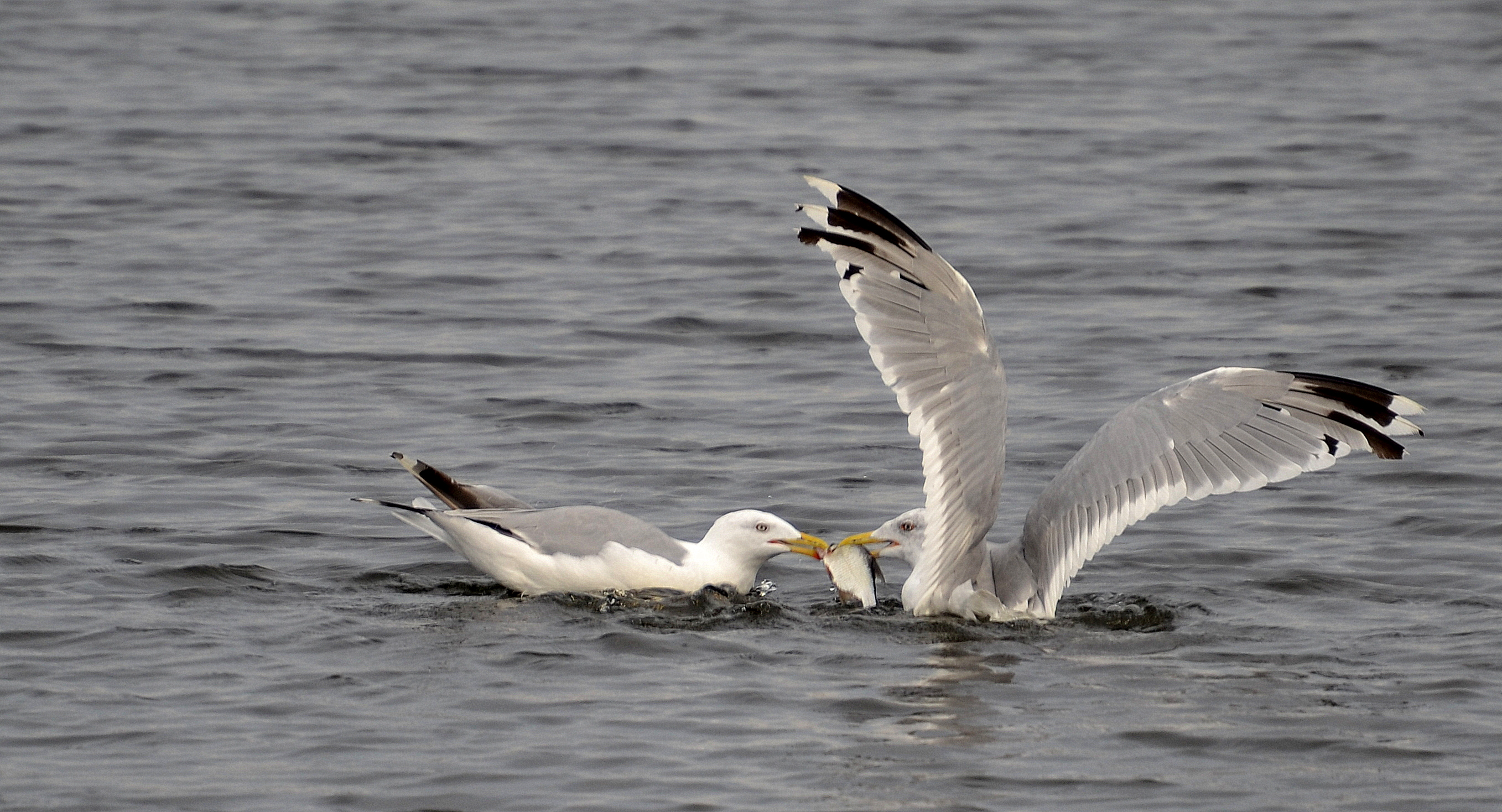
Fighting for a fish.

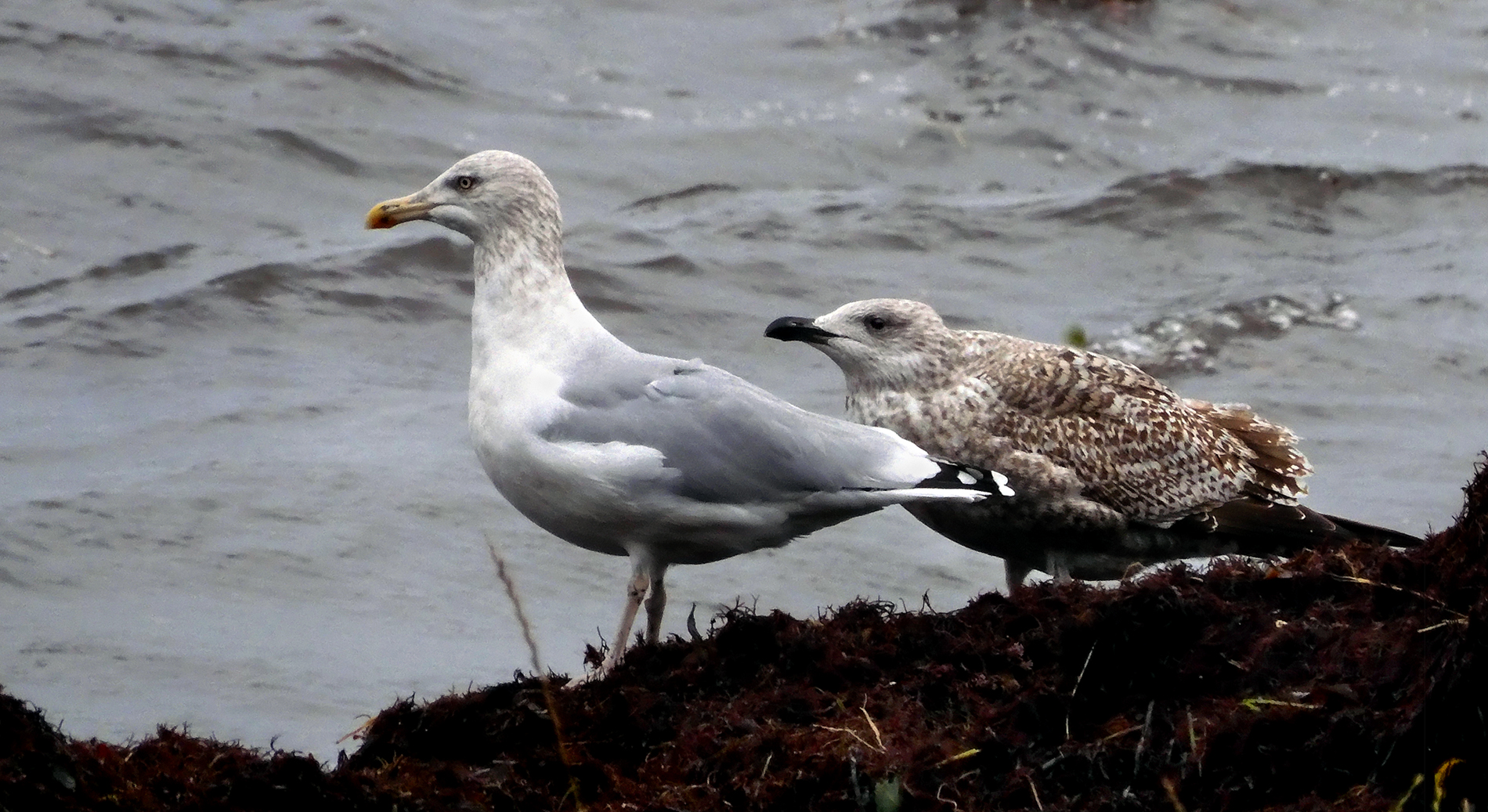
Adult in winter plumage with begging 1cy juvenile.

These are omnivores and opportunists like most Larus gulls, and scavenge from garbage dumps, landfill sites, and sewage outflows, with refuse comprising up to half of the bird's diet. It also steals the eggs and young of other birds (including those of other gulls), as well as seeking suitable small prey in fields, on the coast or in urban areas, or robbing plovers or lapwings of their catches. European herring gulls may also dive from the surface of the water or engage in plunge diving in the pursuit of aquatic prey, though they are typically unable to reach depths greater than 1–2 m (3.3–6.6 ft) due to their natural buoyancy. Despite their name, they have no special preference for herrings — in fact, examinations have shown that echinoderms and crustaceans comprised a greater portion of these gulls' stomach contents than fish, although fish is the principal element of regurgitations for nestlings. European herring gulls can frequently be seen to drop shelled prey from a height to break the shell. In addition, the European herring gull has been observed using pieces of bread as bait with which to catch goldfish. Vegetable matter, such as roots, tubers, seeds, grains, nuts, and fruit, is also taken to an extent. Captive European herring gulls typically show aversion to spoiled meat or heavily salted food, unless they are very hungry. The gulls may also rinse food items in water in an attempt to clean them or render them more palatable before swallowing.

European herring gulls may be observed rhythmically drumming their feet upon the ground for prolonged periods of time in a behaviour that superficially resembles Irish stepdancing, for the purpose of creating vibrations in the soil, driving earthworms to the surface, which are then consumed by the gull. These vibrations are thought to mimic those of digging moles, eliciting a surface-escape behaviour from the earthworm, beneficial in encounters with this particular predator, which the European herring gull then exploits to its own benefit in a similar manner to human worm charmers.

Whilst the European herring gull is fully capable (unlike humans) of consuming seawater without becoming ill, using specialized glands located above the eyes to remove excess salt from the body (which is then excreted in solution through the nostrils and drips from the end of the bill), it drinks fresh water in preference, if available.

The opportunistic diet of the herring gull has consequences for egg traits. A study found that larger eggs were laid in colonies where females consumed either a higher proportion of marine resources or terrestrial resources; smaller eggs were laid in colonies where females had an intermediate diet. In colonies where females consumed more marine items, they also laid eggs with higher maculation (intensity and size of spots) compared with colonies where females mainly consumed terrestrial food.

== Courtship and reproduction ==
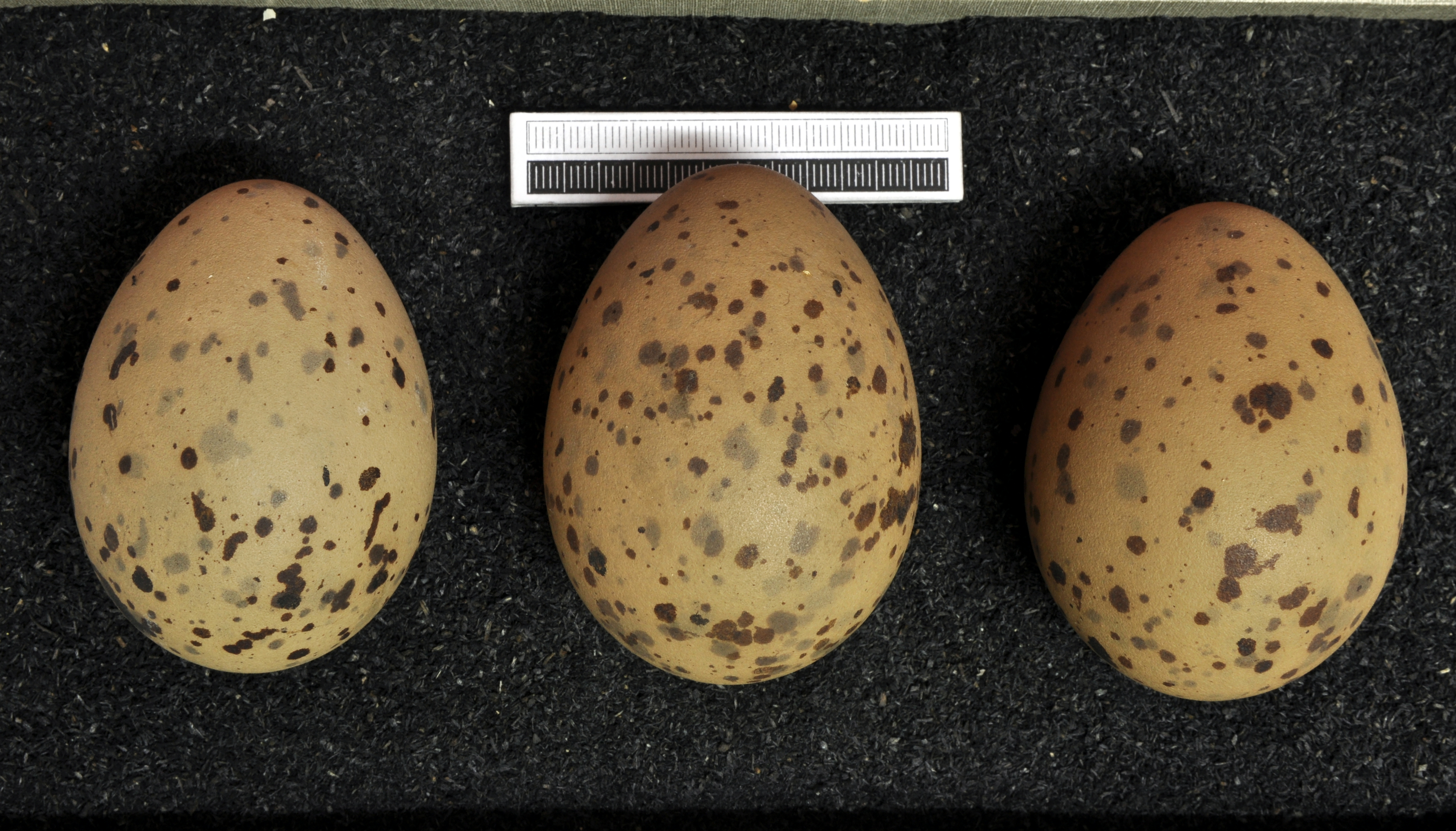
Eggs, Collection Museum Wiesbaden, Germany

When forming a pair bond, the hen approaches the cock on his territory with a hunched, submissive posture, while making begging calls (similar to those emitted by young gulls). If the cock chooses not to attack her and drive her away, he responds by assuming an upright posture and making a mewing call. This is followed by a period of synchronised head-tossing movements, after which the cock then regurgitates some food for his prospective mate. If this is accepted, copulation follows. A nesting site is then chosen by both birds which is returned to in successive years. European herring gulls are almost exclusively sexually monogamous and may pair up for life, provided the couple is successful in hatching their eggs.

Two to four eggs, usually three, are laid on the ground or cliff ledges in colonies, and are defended vigorously by this large gull. The eggs are usually olive-brown in colour with dark speckles or blotches. They are incubated by both parents for 28–30 days. The chicks hatch with their eyes open, covered with fluffy down, and they are able to walk around within hours. Breeding colonies are preyed upon by great black-backed gulls, harriers, corvids and herons.

Juveniles use their beaks to peck at the red spot on the beaks of adults to indicate hunger. Parents then typically disgorge food for their offspring. The young birds are able to fly 35–40 days after hatching and fledge at five or six weeks of age. Chicks are generally fed by their parents until they are 11–12 weeks old, but the feeding may continue for more than six months of age if the young gulls continue to beg. The male feeds the chick more often than the female before fledging, with the female more often feeding after fledging.

Like most gulls, European herring gulls are long-lived, with a maximum age of 49 years recorded. Raptors (especially owls, peregrine falcons, and gyrfalcons) and seals (especially grey seals) occasionally prey on the non-nesting adults.

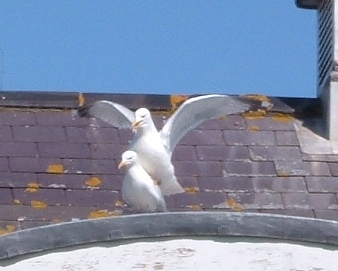
Mating

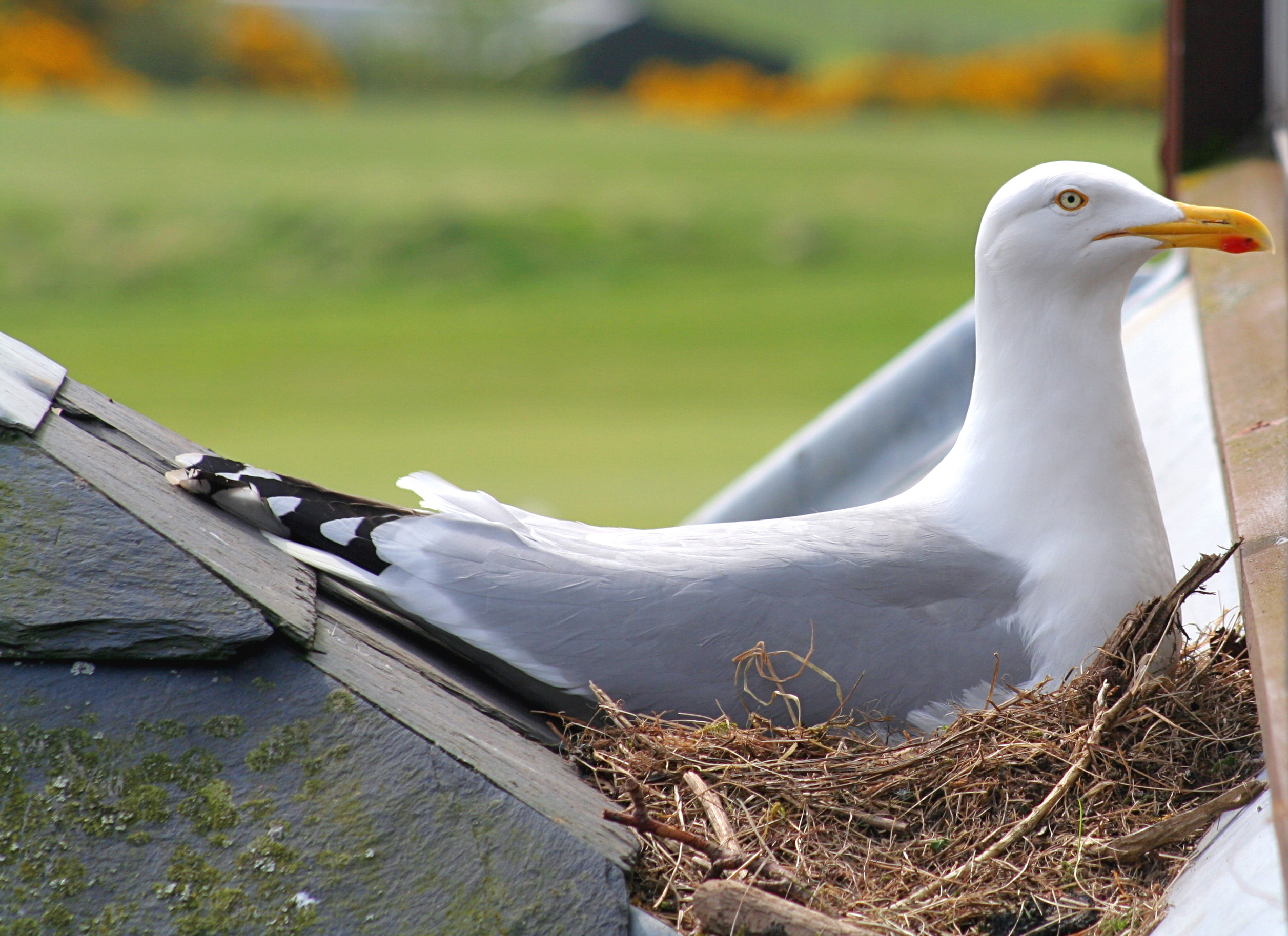
On nest

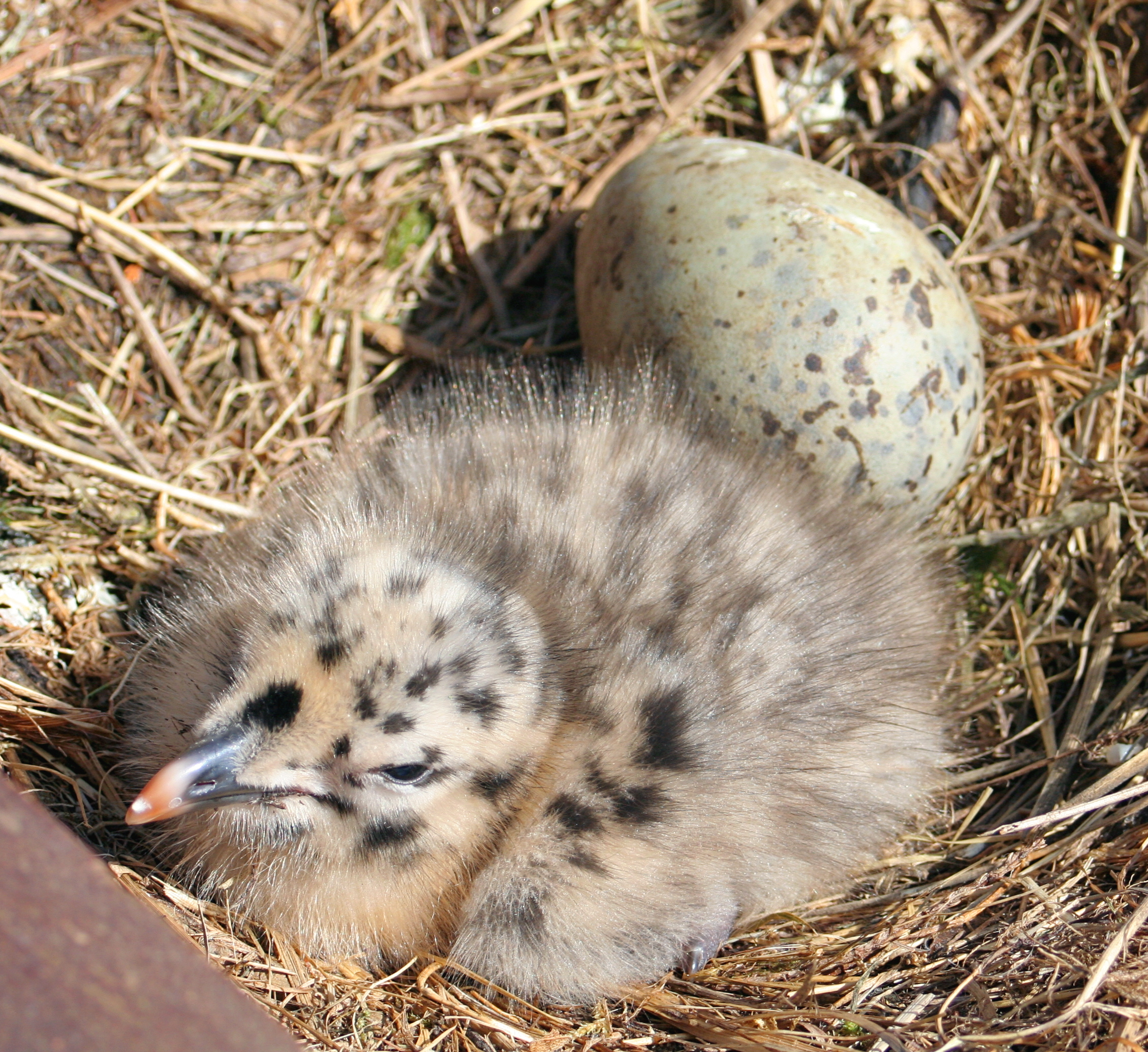
Chick with an egg in nest

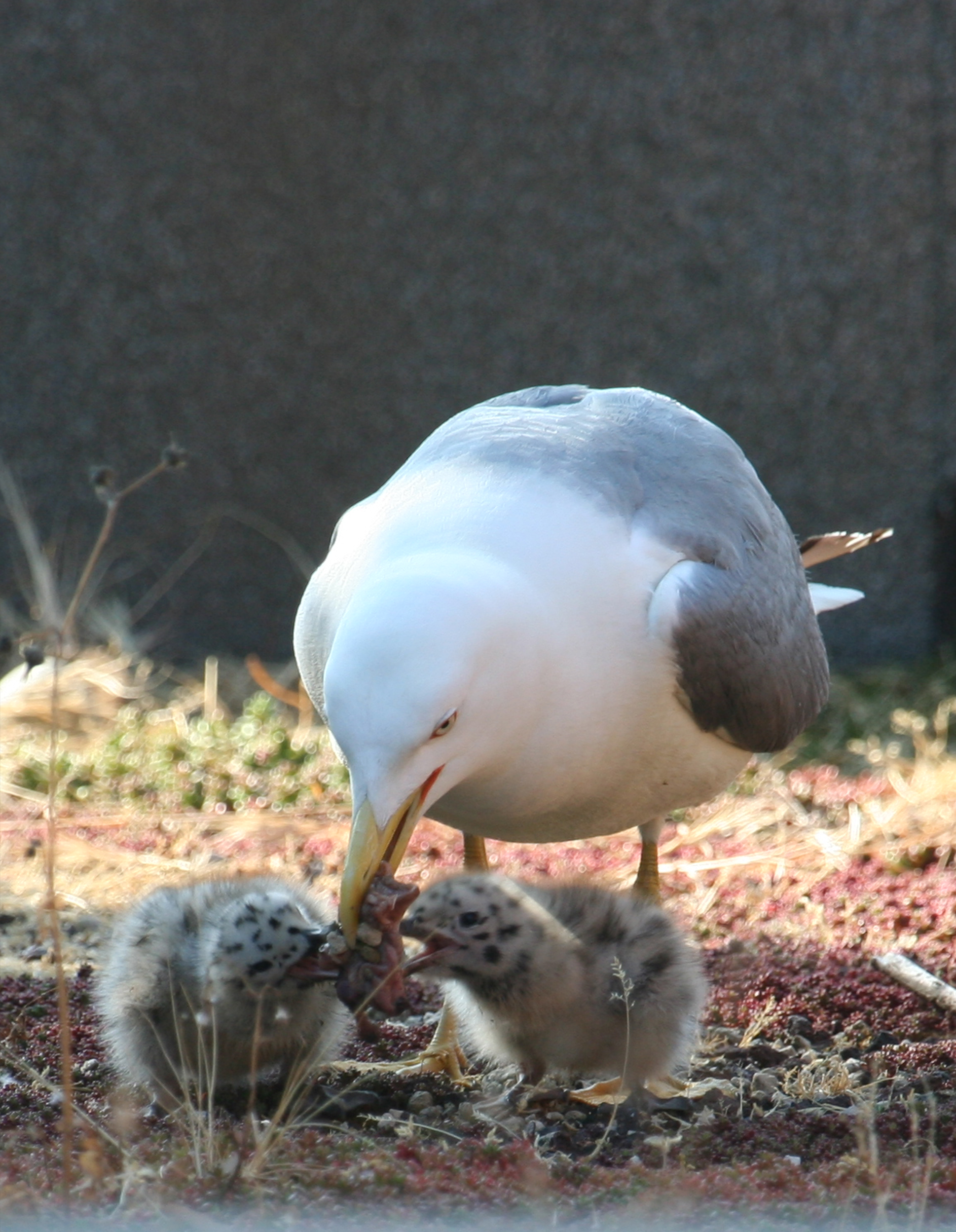
Adult regurgitating food for its chicks

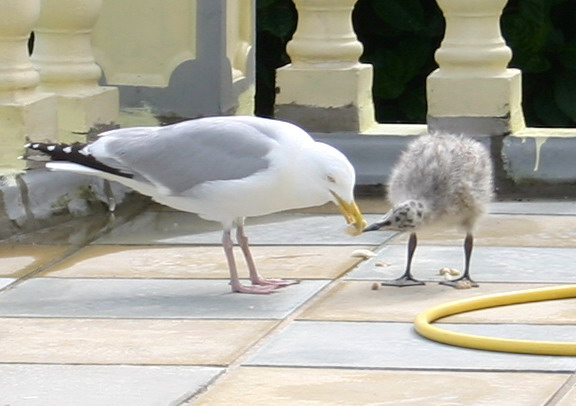
Adult feeding one of its chicks

Chicks in the Netherlands

== Interactions with humans ==
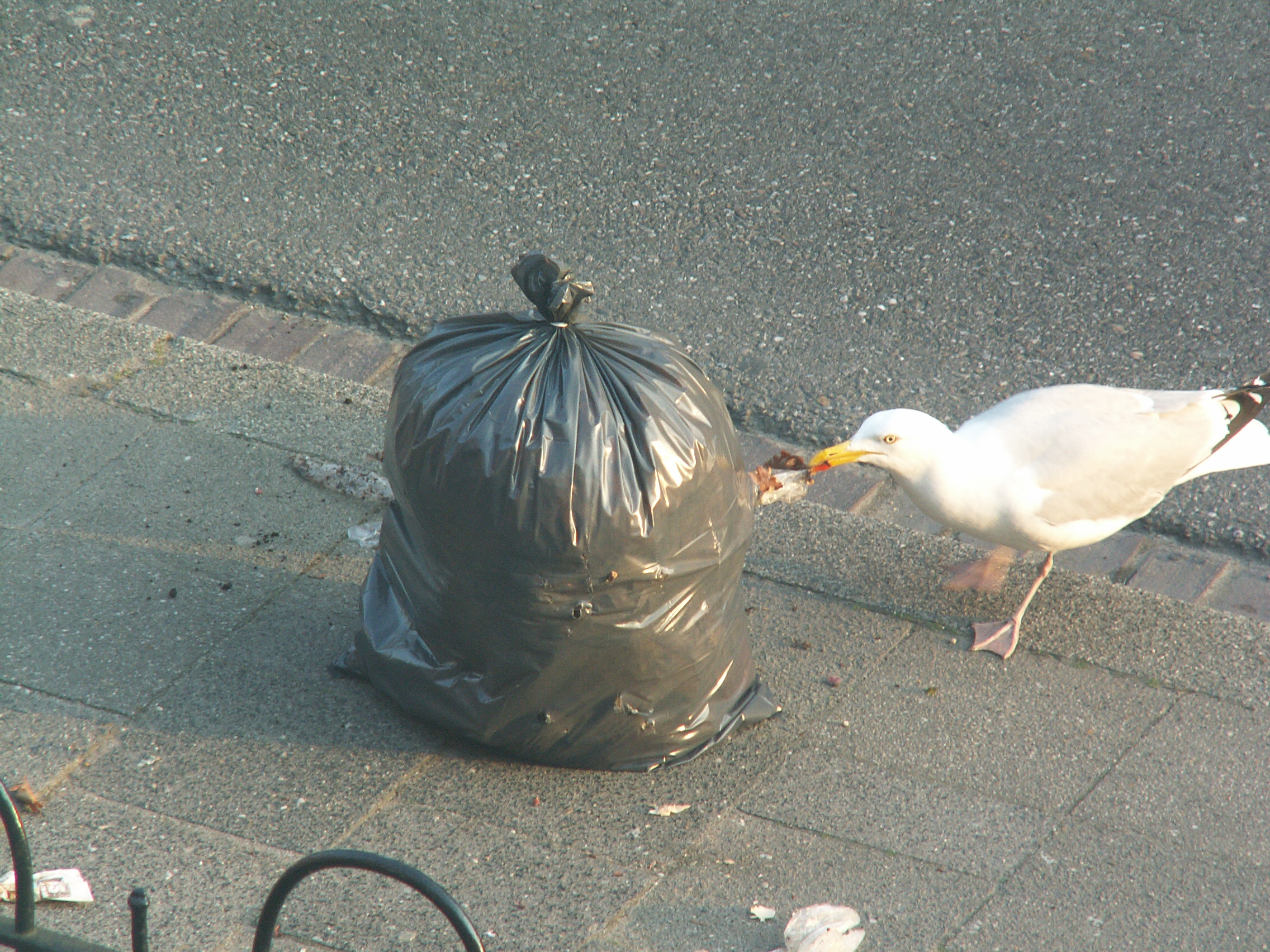
Tearing open a bin bag

Herring gull picking at household plastic waste

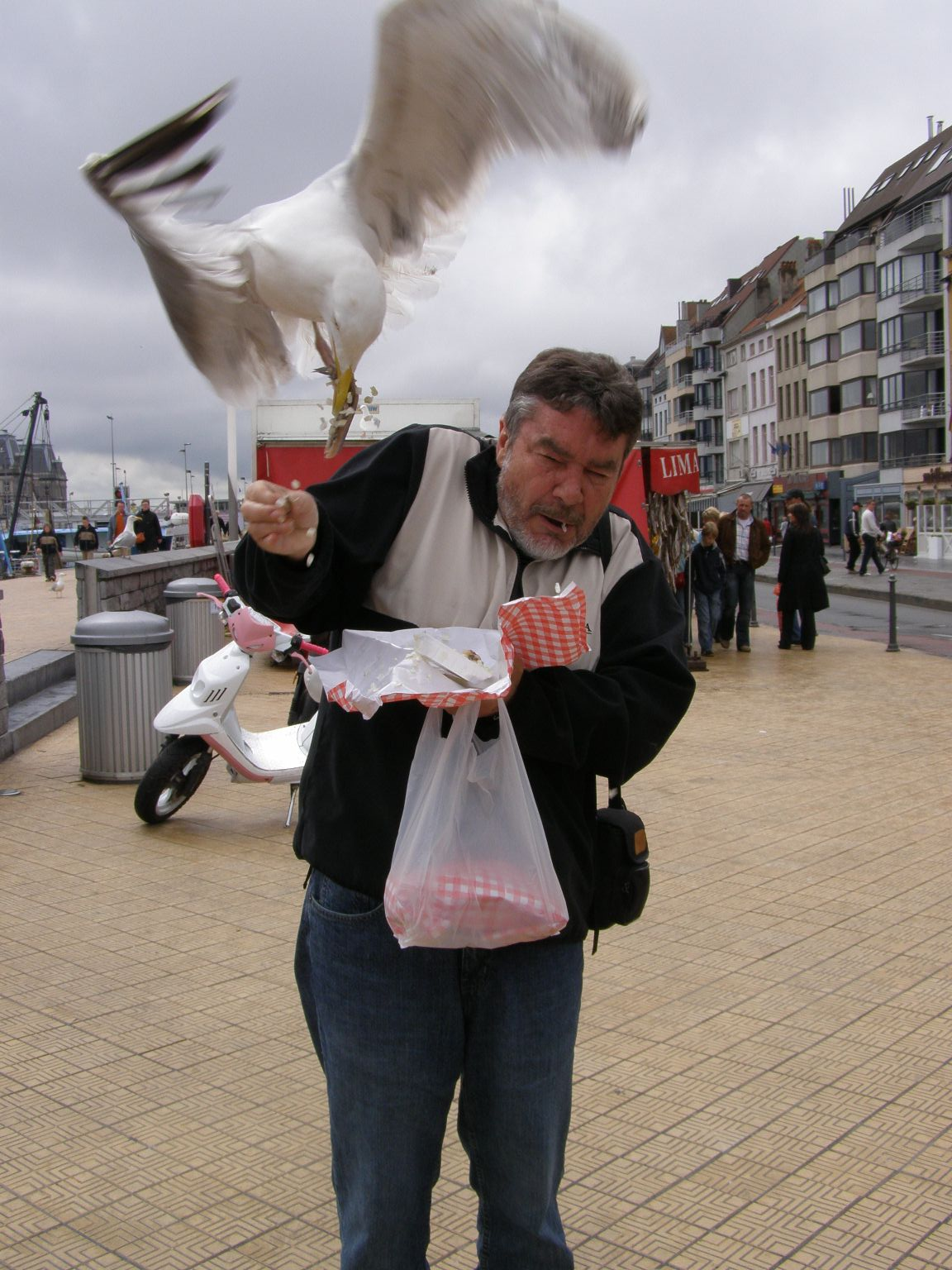
Stealing food from a man's hand

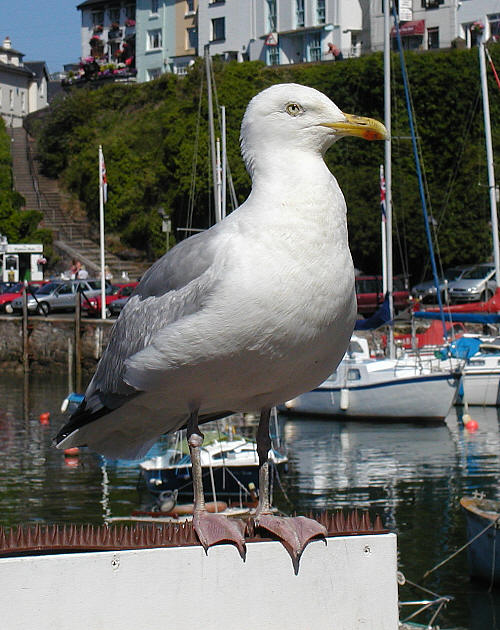
Perching on spikes designed to discourage perching birds

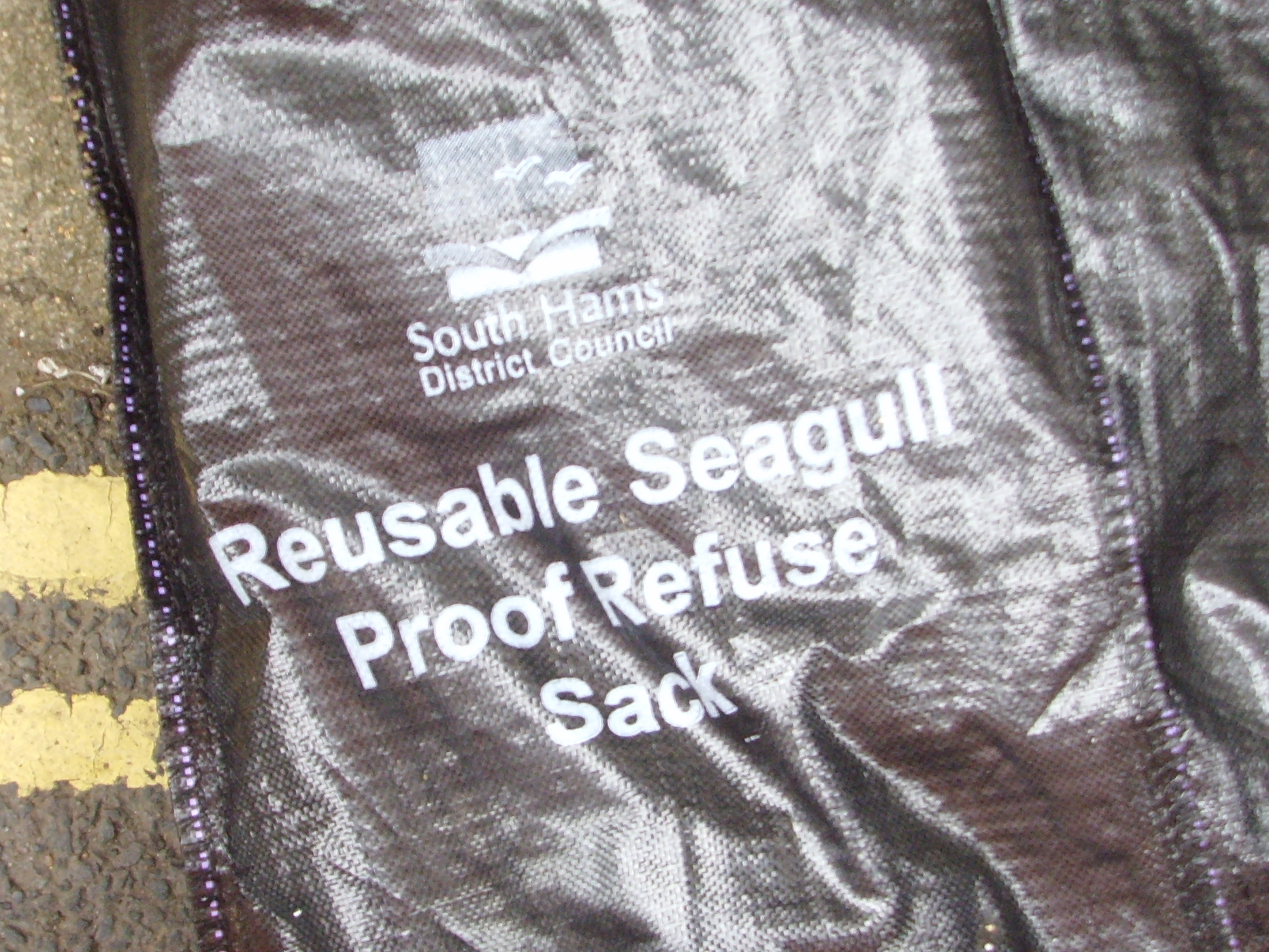
Rubbish bag designed to resist scavenging behaviour

In the UK, the species, when taken as a whole, is declining significantly across the country, despite an increase in urban areas. The UK European herring gull population has decreased by 50% in 25 years and it is protected by law: since January 2010, Natural England has allowed lethal control only with a specific individual licence that is available only in limited circumstances. Natural England made the change following a public consultation in response to the Royal Society for the Protection of Birds in 2009 placing the species on its 'Red List' of threatened bird species, affording it the highest possible conservation status. (Previously, killing the species was allowed under a general licence obtainable by authorised persons (e.g. landowners or occupiers) under certain circumstances (e.g. to prevent serious damage to crops or livestock, to prevent disease, or to preserve public health or safety) without requiring additional permission beyond the general licence.)

The gulls are found all year round in the streets and gardens of Britain, due to the presence of street lighting (which allows the gulls to forage at night), discarded food in streets, food waste contained in easy-to-tear plastic bin bags, food intentionally left out for other birds (or the gulls themselves), the relative lack of predators, and readily available, convenient, warm and undisturbed rooftop nesting space in towns and cities. Particularly large urban gull colonies (composed primarily of European herring gulls and lesser black-backed gulls) are now present in Cardiff, Bristol, Gloucester, Swindon, London, and Aberdeen.

Where not persecuted, herring gulls can become tame in the presence of humans, and may live in proximity to certain humans they learn to trust. Individuals particularly accustomed to frequent human presence have been observed occasionally entering buildings to receive food. In some circumstances, these interactions may even lead to the birds engaging in "shoplifting", actively stealing food from stores and making off with it.

The survival rate for urban gulls is much higher than their counterparts in coastal areas, with an annual adult mortality rate less than 5%. Also, each European herring gull pair commonly rears three chicks per year. This, when combined with their long-lived nature, has resulted in a massive increase in numbers over a relatively short period of time and has brought urban-dwelling members of the species into conflict with humans.

Once familiar with humans, urban European herring gulls show little hesitation in swooping down to steal food from the hands of humans, although a study conducted in 2019 demonstrated that some gulls are more averse to snatching food in proximity to humans if the experimenter made eye contact with the bird. During the breeding season, the gulls also aggressively 'dive bomb' and attempt to strike with claws and wings (sometimes spraying faeces or vomit at the same time) at humans that they perceive to be a threat to their eggs and chicks—often innocent passers-by or residents of the buildings on which they have constructed their nests. Large amounts of gull excrement deposited on property and the noise from courting pairs and begging chicks in the summer is also considered to be a nuisance by humans living alongside the European herring gull.

Nonlethal attempts to deter the gulls from nesting in urban areas have been largely unsuccessful. The European herring gull is intelligent and will completely ignore most bird-scaring technology after determining that it poses no threat. Rooftop spikes, tensioned wires, netting, and similar are also generally ineffective against this species, as it has large, wide feet with thick, leathery skin, which affords the seagull excellent weight distribution and protection from sharp objects (the bird may simply balance itself on top of these obstacles with little apparent concern). If nests are removed and eggs are taken, broken, or oiled, the gulls simply rebuild and/or relay, or choose another nest site in the same area and start again.

Man-made models of birds of prey placed on top of buildings are generally ignored by the gulls once they realise they are not real, and attempts to scare the gulls away using raptors are similarly ineffective. Although they are intimidated by birds of prey, European herring gulls, in addition to being social birds with strength in numbers, are large, powerful, and aggressive as individuals and are more than capable of fighting back against the potential predator, particularly if they consider their chicks to be at risk; in fact, the gulls may actually pose a greater threat to a raptor than vice versa. European herring gulls are also naturally accustomed to predators (such as skuas and great black-backed gulls) living in the vicinity of their nest sites in the wild and are not particularly discouraged from breeding by their presence.
