= Andrey Semyonov-Tyan-Shansky =

Russian entomologist (1866–1942)

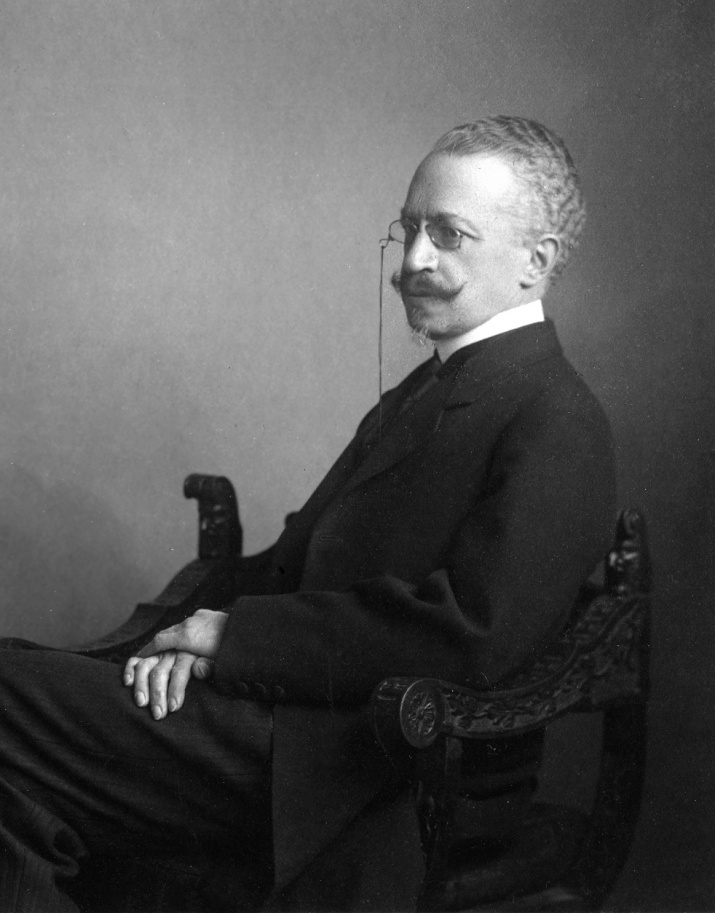
In 1910

Andrey Petrovich Semyonov-Tyan-Shansky (Russian: Андре́й Петро́вич Семёнов-Тянь-Ша́нский) (9 June 1866 – 8 April 1942) was a Russian entomologist specializing in beetles. He was the son of Pyotr Semyonov-Tyan-Shansky. He was among the first entomologists to consider the protection of insects and the risk of their extinction.

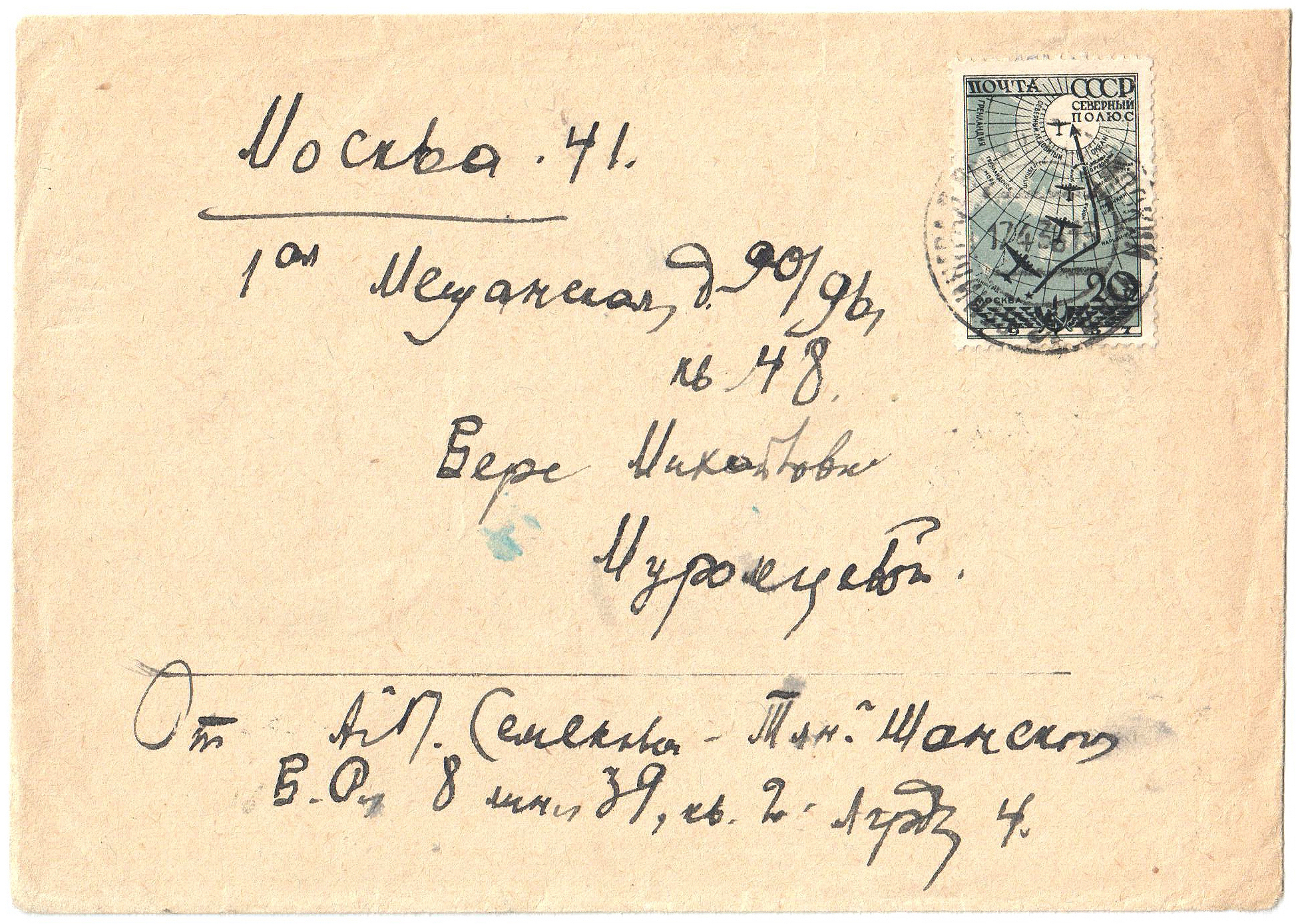
Cover sent by Andrey Petrovich Semyonov-Tyan-Shansky in 1938.

Semyonov-Tyan-Shansky was the son of the famous explorer Pyotr Semyonov-Tyan-Shansky and was born in St. Petersburg where he graduated from the 8th St. Petersburg gymnasium in 1885. At home he was trained in music and illustration. He could also speak Latin. He then studied in the St. Petersburg University. Apart from his father, he was influenced by N. A. Severtsov and the entomologist August Feodorovitsh Morawitz (1837–1897).

In 1888 and 1889 he traveled to the Trans-Caspian and Turkestan regions in search of insects, then in 1890 became a curator of entomology at the Zoological Museum of the Imperial Academy of Sciences. He worked at the museum only until 1896 and then worked at his home. He studied mainly the Hymenoptera and Dermaptera. Citations of this author most frequently bear the Germanized spelling Semenov-Tian-Shanskij (e.g. ).

He also took an interest in the poetry of Pushkin, the protection of nature, and a range of other subjects. He lost his vision at the age of 55 but continued to work, making use of his memory and assistants to help describe species, which he then transcribed. He died from pneumonia during the siege of Leningrad and his death date is uncertain, noted as 7 March or 8 April according to sources.
