= Huahine gull =

Huahine gull Temporal range: Late Holocene

Conservation status
- Extinct

Scientific classification
- Kingdom: Animalia
- Phylum: Chordata
- Class: Aves
- Order: Charadriiformes
- Family: Laridae
- Genus: Chroicocephalus
- Species: †C. utunui

Binomial name
- †Chroicocephalus utunui (Steadman, 2002)

Synonyms
- Larus utunui

Extinct species of bird

The Huahine gull (Chroicocephalus utunui), also known as the Society Islands gull, is an extinct bird, a species of gull of which subfossil bones were found at the Fa'ahia archeological site on Huahine, in the Society Islands of French Polynesia.

The site is an early Polynesian occupation site dating to between 700 CE and 1200 CE, containing, as well as anthropogenic material, the remains of many species of birds now either globally or locally extinct, that were killed for their flesh, bones or feathers. The gull was described (as Larus utunui) from 12 bones from two individual birds. Osteological similarities suggest that the nearest living relative of the Huahine gull is the silver gull (C. novaehollandiae), the nearest extant populations of which are in New Zealand, 3,800 km south-west of Huahine.
