= Huahine cuckoo-dove =

Huahine cuckoo-dove Temporal range: Late Holocene

Scientific classification
- Kingdom: Animalia
- Phylum: Chordata
- Class: Aves
- Order: Columbiformes
- Family: Columbidae
- Genus: Macropygia
- Species: M. arevarevauupa

Binomial name
- Macropygia arevarevauupa Steadman, 1992

Extinct species of bird

The Huahine cuckoo-dove (Macropygia arevarevauupa) is an extinct species of bird in the family Columbidae. It was endemic to French Polynesia where subfossil bones between 750 and 1250 years old have been found at the Fa'ahia early occupation site on Huahine in the Society Islands.
