= Great ground dove =

Great ground dove Temporal range: Late Holocene

Conservation status
- Extinct

Scientific classification
- Kingdom: Animalia
- Phylum: Chordata
- Class: Aves
- Order: Columbiformes
- Family: Columbidae
- Genus: Pampusana
- Species: †P. nui

Binomial name
- †Pampusana nui (Steadman, 1992)

Synonyms
- Gallicolumba nui Steadman, 1992; Alopecoenas nui

Extinct species of bird

The great ground dove (Pampusana nui) is an extinct species of bird in the family Columbidae. It was found in Mangaia in the southern Cook Islands, and in French Polynesia where subfossil bones between 1000 and 2000 years old have been found in the Marquesas, as well as between 750 and 1250 years old at the Fa'ahia early occupation site on Huahine in the Society Islands.
