= Huahine rail =

Huahine rail Temporal range: Late Holocene

Conservation status
- Extinct

Scientific classification
- Kingdom: Animalia
- Phylum: Chordata
- Class: Aves
- Order: Gruiformes
- Family: Rallidae
- Genus: Gallirallus
- Species: †G. storrsolsoni

Binomial name
- †Gallirallus storrsolsoni Kirchman & Steadman, 2006

Extinct species of bird

The Huahine rail (Gallirallus storrsolsoni) was a species of bird in the family Rallidae. It was a medium-sized Gallirallus rail endemic to Huahine in the Society Islands of French Polynesia. It is known only from subfossil remains found at the Fa'ahia archaeological site on the island. Fa'ahia is an early Polynesian occupation site with radiocarbon dates ranging from 700 CE to 1200 CE. The rail is only one of a suite of birds found at the site which became extinct either locally or globally following human occupation of the island.

== Etymology ==
The species was named after Storrs Olson to recognise his contributions to the systematics, paleontology and evolution of flightless rails on islands.
