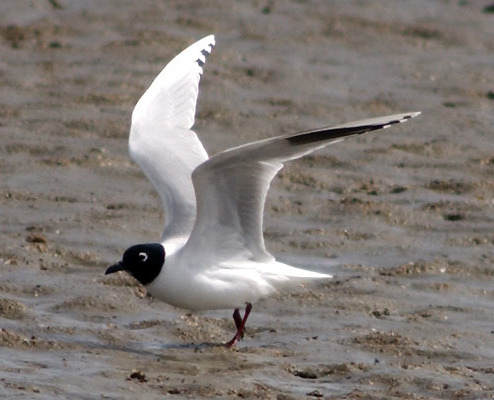
- Summer plumage
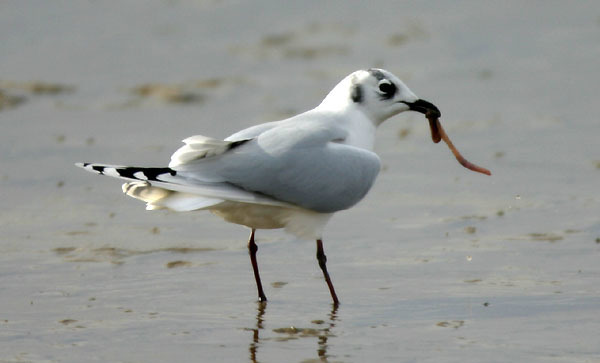
- Winter plumage

Conservation status
- Vulnerable (IUCN 3.1)

Scientific classification
- Kingdom: Animalia
- Phylum: Chordata
- Class: Aves
- Order: Charadriiformes
- Family: Laridae
- Genus: Saundersilarus; Dwight, 1926
- Species: S. saundersi

Binomial name
- Saundersilarus saundersi (Swinhoe, 1871)

Synonyms
- Larus saundersi; Chroicocephalus saundersi

= Saunders's gull =

Species of bird

Saunders's gull (Saundersilarus saundersi) or Chinese black-headed gull, is a species of gull in the family Laridae. It is found in China, Japan, North Korea, South Korea, Macau, Russia, Taiwan, and Vietnam. Its natural habitats are estuarine waters and intertidal marshes. As with many other gulls, it has traditionally been placed in the genus Larus, but based on phylogenetic work some have moved it to Chroicocephalus, while others argue it is sufficiently distinct for placement in the monotypic Saundersilarus. In 2023, this transfer was accepted by the International Ornithologists' Union.

It is threatened by habitat loss, particularly by conversion of saltmarsh to agricultural land or fish farms, and industrial development including oil extraction. One of its few remaining strongholds are the Yancheng Coastal Wetlands, which hosts about 20% of the world's population.

Saunders's gull is named after the British ornithologist Howard Saunders.

== Description ==
This is a very small species of gull with a length of just 33 cm (13 in) and, among gulls, only the little gull is smaller. Adults have a black hood and nape during the breeding season. It is very pale with a white body and tail, pale grey wings. Non-breeding birds have a mottled grey hood and nape, and white-tipped wings with black markings on the primaries. Immatures are distinguished by having a narrow black tail band and some dark mottling on the upperwing. The legs are dark red-brown, and the short bill is black; the body is squat.

== Distribution and habitat ==
Saunders's gull breeds in eastern China and the west coast of Korea. It breeds in saltmarshes dominated by the Suaeda species Suaeda glauca. It overwinters in southern China, Hong Kong, Macau, Taiwan, South Korea, southwestern Japan and Vietnam. Its winter habitats are estuaries and aquaculture ponds and some populations move inland to lakes and marshes.

== Biology ==
Saunders's gull catches its prey by flying above the ground at about ten metres (11 yd) and dropping swiftly on any suitable prey it finds. In this way it catches mudskippers, crabs, fish and worms. It is also a kleptoparasite, stealing food items from other species of birds. It is a poor swimmer, having only partially webbed feet, and usually stays on land, moving up the beach in front of the rising tide.

It breeds in saltmarshes, its nest being a simple scrape in the ground. The birds are monogamous and each pair occupies a territory. Two or three eggs are laid in May and incubation takes about 22 days. Adults and young birds leave for their winter quarters in October.

== Status ==
The total population of this gull is estimated as being 14,400 individuals but perhaps as low as 7,100–9,600, and seems to be in decline. The IUCN has rated it as "vulnerable". The main threats it faces are the degradation of its habitat as it is very dependent on saltmarshes dominated by Suaeda. In China, Taiwan, South Korea, Japan and elsewhere, saltmarshes are being drained to make way for aquaculture. The introduction of the strong-growing Spartina alterniflora (smooth cord-grass) has also had deleterious effects. The disturbance of adults also results in greater predation on the eggs and chicks.
