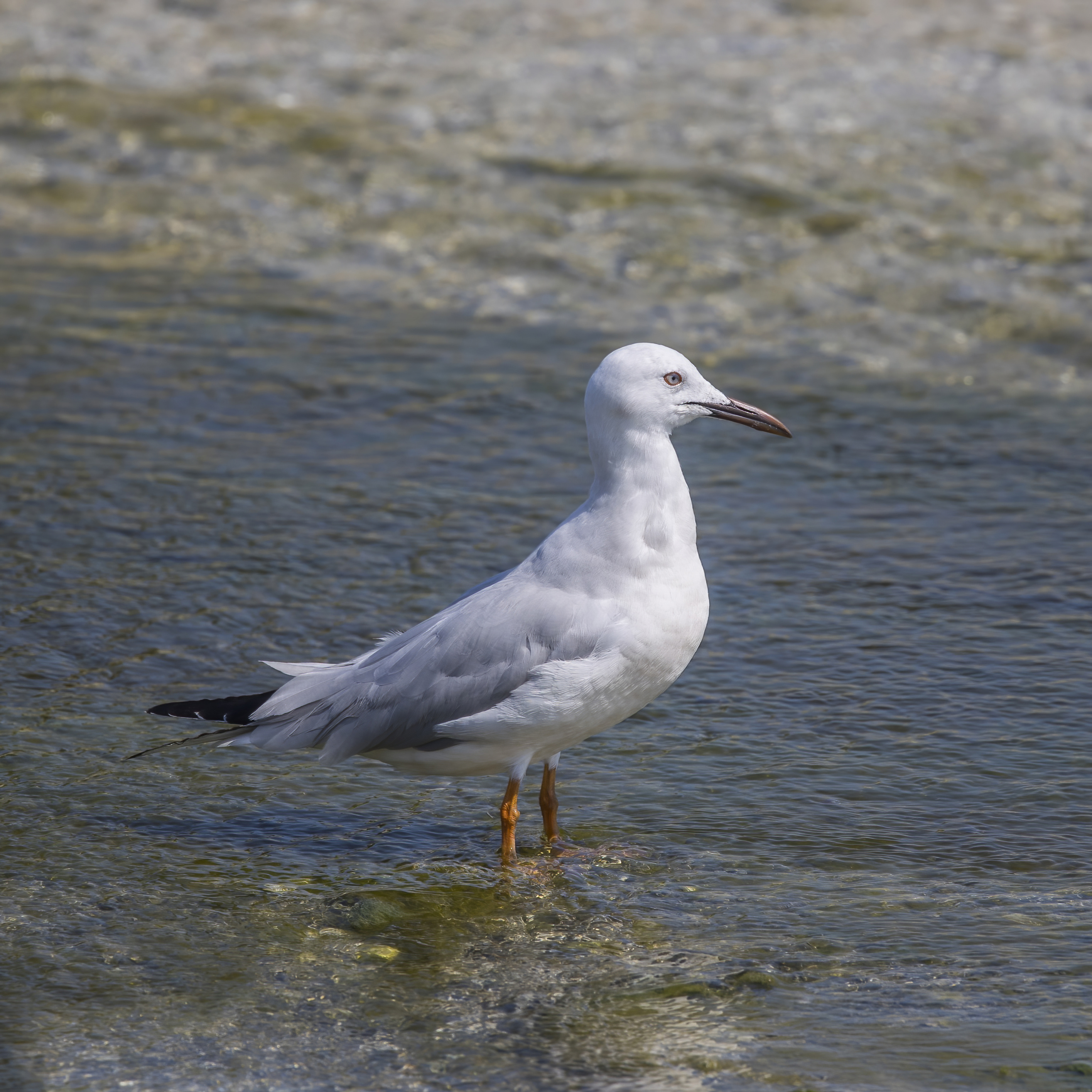
- Winter plumage, Bahrain

Conservation status
- Least Concern (IUCN 3.1)

Scientific classification
- Kingdom: Animalia
- Phylum: Chordata
- Class: Aves
- Order: Charadriiformes
- Family: Laridae
- Genus: Chroicocephalus
- Species: C. genei

Binomial name
- Chroicocephalus genei (Breme, 1839)
- Range of C. genei Breeding Resident Non-breeding

Synonyms
- Larus genei

= Slender-billed gull =

Species of bird

The slender-billed gull (Chroicocephalus genei) is a mid-sized gull which breeds very locally around the Mediterranean and the north of the western Indian Ocean (e.g. Pakistan) on islands and coastal lagoons. Most of the population is somewhat migratory, wintering further south to as far as North Africa and India. A few birds have wandered to western Europe. A vagrant individual was reportedly seen on Antigua, April 24, 1976 (AOU, 2000).

The genus name Chroicocephalus is from Ancient Greek khroizo, "to colour", and kephale, "head". The specific genei commemorates Italian naturalist Giuseppe Gené.

== Description ==
This species is 37 to 40 cm (14.6 to 15.7 in) long with a 90 to 102 cm (35.4 to 40.2 in) wingspan. It is therefore slightly larger than the black-headed gull, which it resembles, although it does not have a black hood in summer. It has a pale grey body, white head and breast and black tips to the primary wing feathers. The head and dark red bill have an elongated tapering appearance, and this bird also appears long-necked. The legs are dark red, and the iris is yellow. In summer, the breast has a faint pink colouration. This bird takes two years to reach maturity, as is usual in gulls. First year immature birds have a black terminal tail band, and dark areas on the wings.

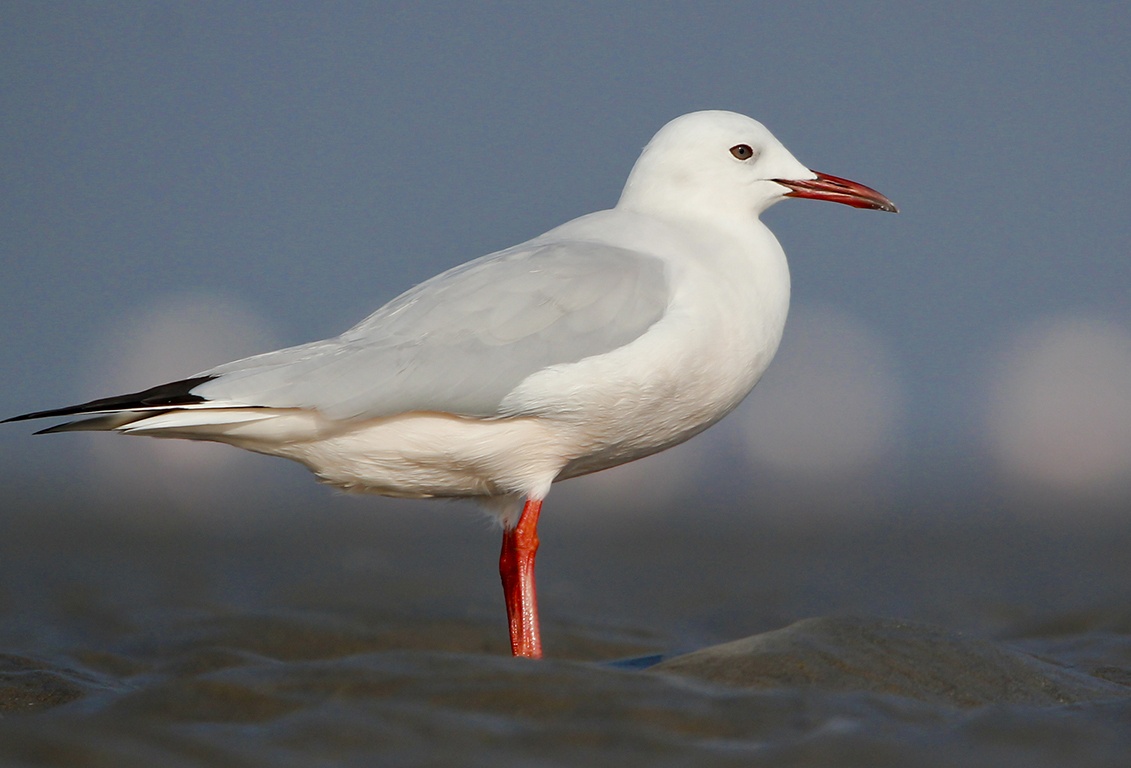
in Breeding plumage, Kutch

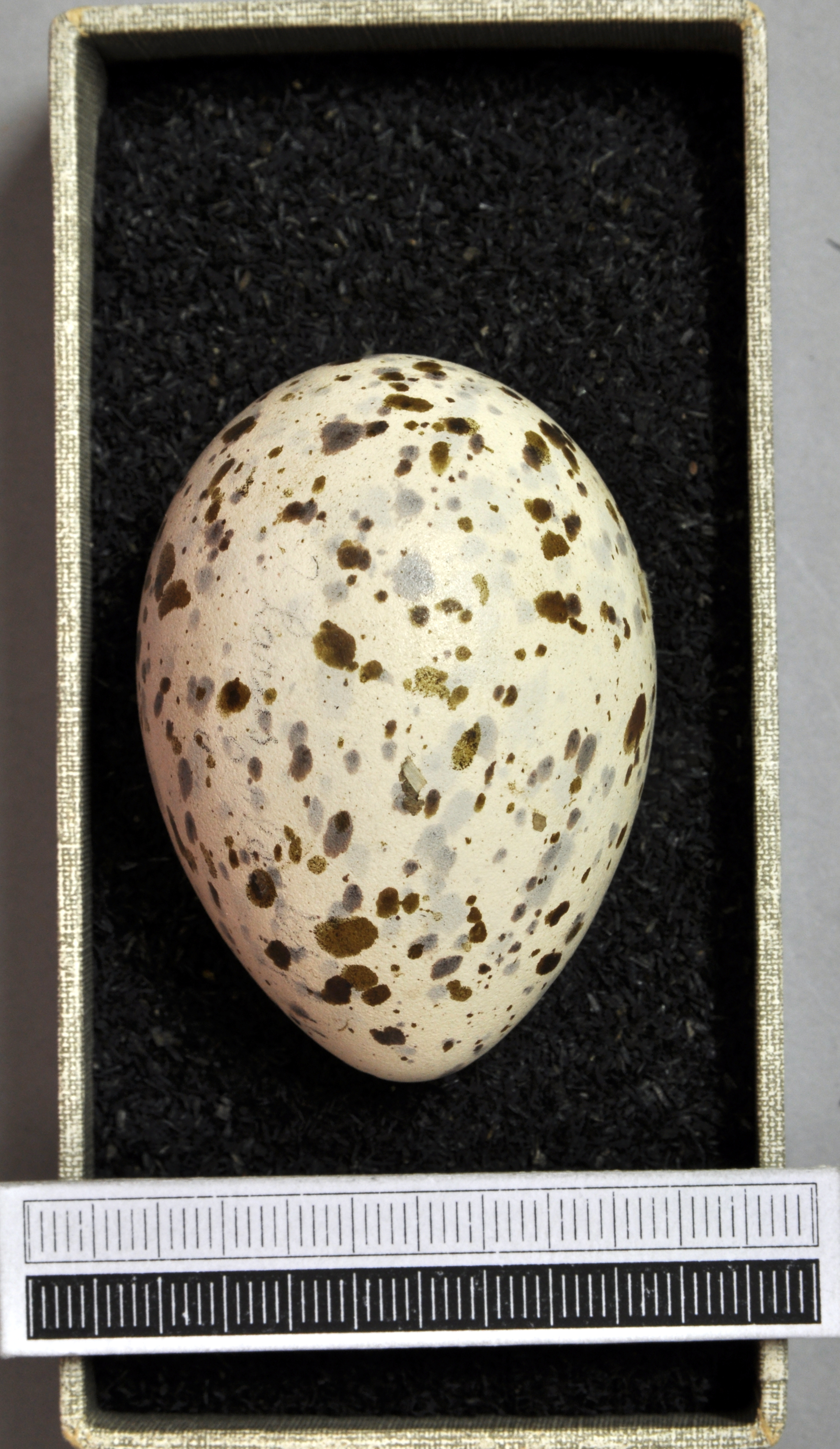
egg

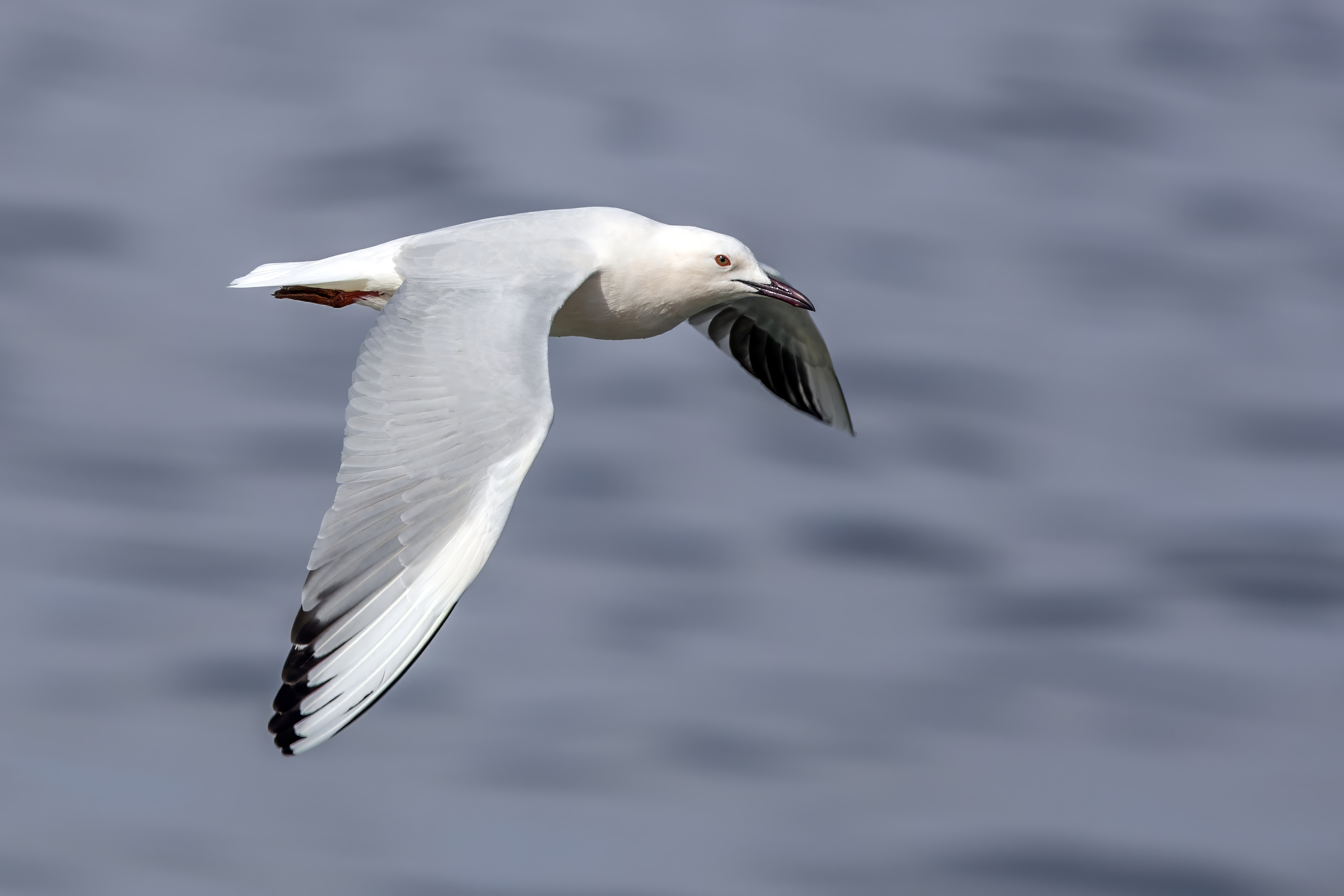
in flight

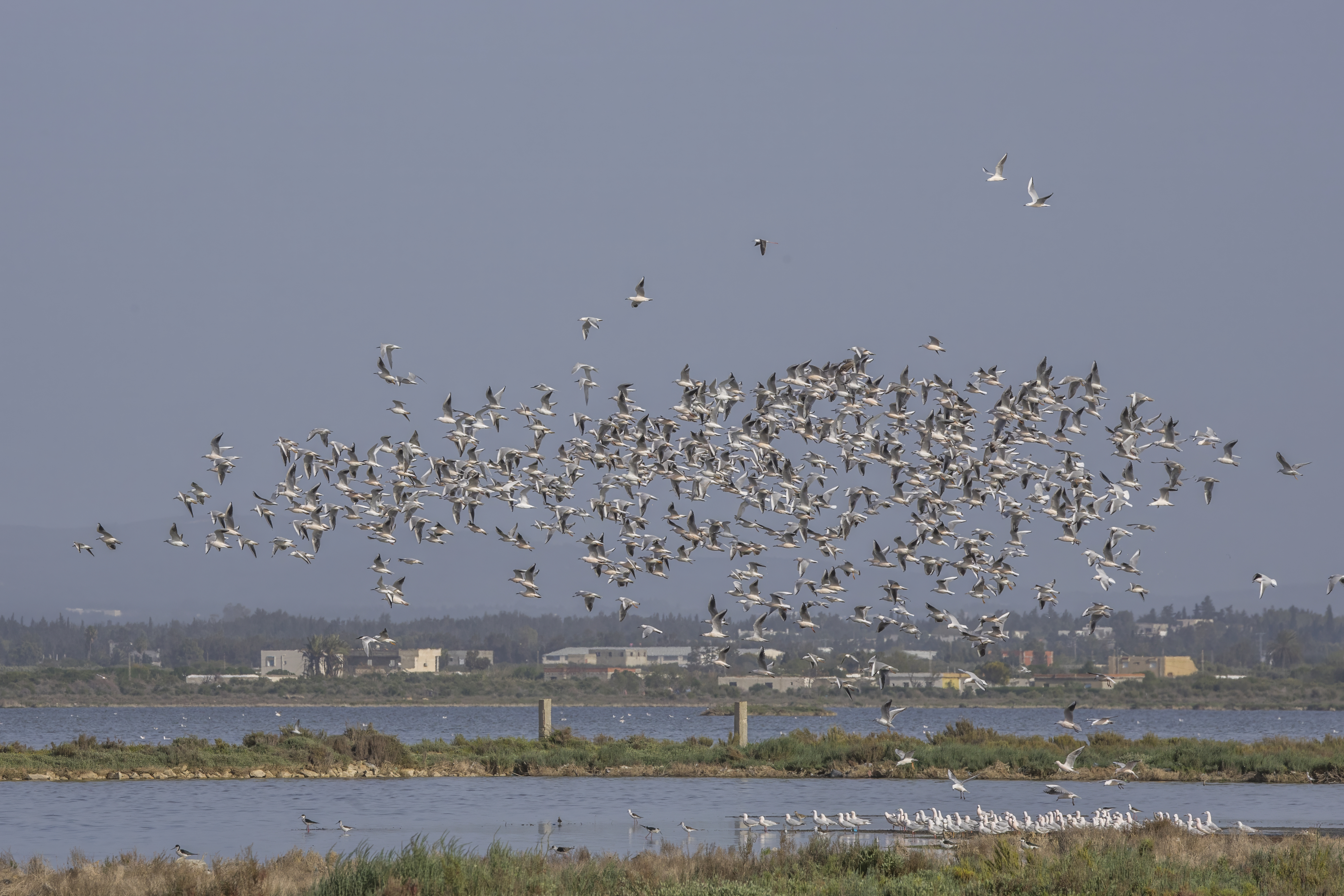
flock

== Distribution and habitat ==
The slender-billed gull breeds in lagoons and lakes around the Mediterranean Sea and in similar locations in countries bordering the northwestern part of the Indian Ocean. In 2010 a successful colony was found breeding on an island in a mountain lake in Algeria. The lack of predators and disturbance allowed over 98% of the eggs to hatch. It overwinters on the coast in estuaries and bays. It feeds in deltas, marshes and grassland. It is one of a number of species of gull to feed on landfill sites.

== Behaviour ==
About half of the slender-billed gull's food is fish. It flies a few metres above the surface of the water and dives into the water when it sees suitable prey. It also probes in the mud with its beak to feed on marine invertebrates and catches insects in flight.

This rather uncommon gull breeds in colonies, nesting on the ground and laying up to three brown-spotted white eggs in a scrape sparsely lined with feathers and bits of vegetation. Incubation takes about 25 days and the young fly after another 25 days. Like most gulls, it is gregarious in winter, both when feeding and in evening roosts. It is not a pelagic species, and is rarely seen far from land.

== Status ==
The slender-billed gull is one of the species to which the Agreement on the Conservation of African-Eurasian Migratory Waterbirds (AEWA) applies.
