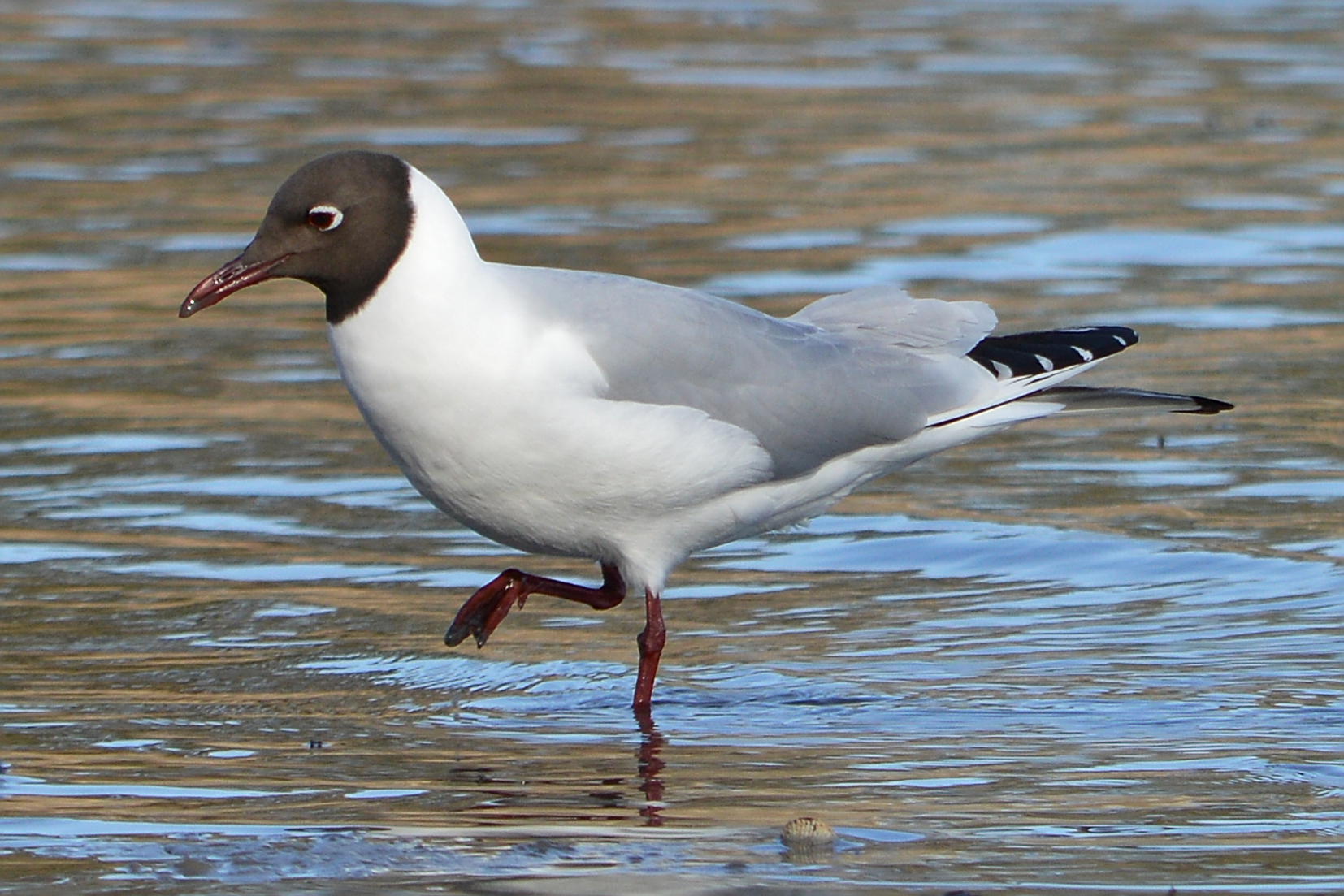
- Black-headed gull (Chroicocephalus ridibundus)

Scientific classification
- Kingdom: Animalia
- Phylum: Chordata
- Class: Aves
- Order: Charadriiformes
- Family: Laridae
- Genus: Chroicocephalus; Eyton, 1836

Type species
- Larus capistratus Temminck, 1820 = Larus ridibundus Linnaeus, 1766

Species
- See list

= Chroicocephalus =

Genus of birds

Chroicocephalus is a genus of medium to relatively small gulls which were included in the genus Larus until genetic evidence published in 2005 showed that Larus as then constituted was paraphyletic. Ten species are currently accepted. The genus name Chroicocephalus is from Ancient Greek khroizo, "to colour", and kephale, "head".

== Taxonomy ==
The species now placed in this genus were formerly assigned to the genus Larus. A molecular phylogenetic study published in 2005 found that Larus, as then constituted, was paraphyletic. In the resulting rearrangement to create monophyletic genera, the genus Chroicocephalus was resurrected to contain a clade of species, all of which have black heads. The genus Chroicocephalus had been introduced in 1836 by the English naturalist Thomas Campbell Eyton. Although he listed two species in the new genus, he did not specify a type. In 1840 George Gray designated the type as Larus capistratus which had been described by Coenraad Jacob Temminck in 1820. This taxa is now considered to be a junior synonym of Larus ridibundus, the black-headed gull, that had been named in 1766 by Carl Linnaeus. The genus name Chroicocephalus combines the Ancient Greek χρωικος/khrōikos meaning "coloured" with -κεφαλος /-kephalos meaning "-headed".

Saunders's gull was formerly included in this genus until a 2022 study demonstrated that although it occupied a basal position in the genus, it was not closely related to the other members. It is now placed in its own genus Saundersilarus.

== Description ==
The species range from 28 cm up to 48 cm long, with Bonaparte's gull being the smallest, and Andean gull the largest. In all species, the body and tail are white, and the upperwing pale grey; the wingtips have distinct grey, white, and black patterns important for identification. Several have distinctively brown, pale grey, or blackish-grey coloured heads in the breeding season, but some also have the head pure white like the rest of the body. The eyes are dark in some species, or with a distinctive white iris in others; the legs and bills are bright to very dark red.

Representatives of this genus are found in regions/subregions all over the world, except for Antarctica; the species are often parapatric, but with two species together in New Zealand, the Mediterranean region, parts of southern Africa, and parts of South America. Exceptionally, three species (black-headed, brown-headed, and slender-billed gulls) can occur together in parts of southwest Asia.

== Species ==
The genus contains ten species.

Image	Common name	Scientific name	Breeding range
	Slender-billed gull	Chroicocephalus genei	south Iberian Peninsula, south Europe, Black and Caspian Seas and Turkey to Central Asia, Pakistan and coastal far northwest India; Mauritania, Senegal and Gambia
	Bonaparte's gull	Chroicocephalus philadelphia	Boreal forest zone from southwest Alaska mainland and northwest, southwest Canada to east Quebec
	Silver gull	Chroicocephalus novaehollandiae	Inland south Australia and coastal throughout Australia; coastal New Zealand and outlying islands and New Caledonia
	Black-billed gull	Chroicocephalus bulleri	Mostly on braided rivers, North and South Islands of New Zealand
	Andean gull	Chroicocephalus serranus	Andes of far southwest Colombia to south central Chile and southwest Argentina
	Brown-hooded gull	Chroicocephalus maculipennis	Inland and coastal southeast Brazil, central Chile, north central Argentina and Falkland Islands
	Black-headed gull	Chroicocephalus ridibundus	Coastal far south Greenland, inland Iceland, temperate and subarctic west Europe across Russia to Yakutsk region, Kamchatka Peninsula, Sakhalin (east Russia); in south through Caspian Sea, north Central Asia, north, central Mongolia and northeast China; also west central Newfoundland
	Brown-headed gull	Chroicocephalus brunnicephalus	Inland Tibetan Plateau of Tajikistan, Xinjiang (west China), Ladakh (far northwest India) and Tibet
	Grey-headed gull	Chroicocephalus cirrocephalus	Coastal and inland Africa south of the Sahara and Madagascar; coastal Ecuador and Peru; south Uruguay and northeast Argentina to Santa Fe, Argentina
	Hartlaub's gull	Chroicocephalus hartlaubii	Coastal central Namibia to Western Cape, South Africa

== Fossils ==
- †Huahine gull Chroicocephalus utunui Huahine in the Society Islands, French Polynesia
