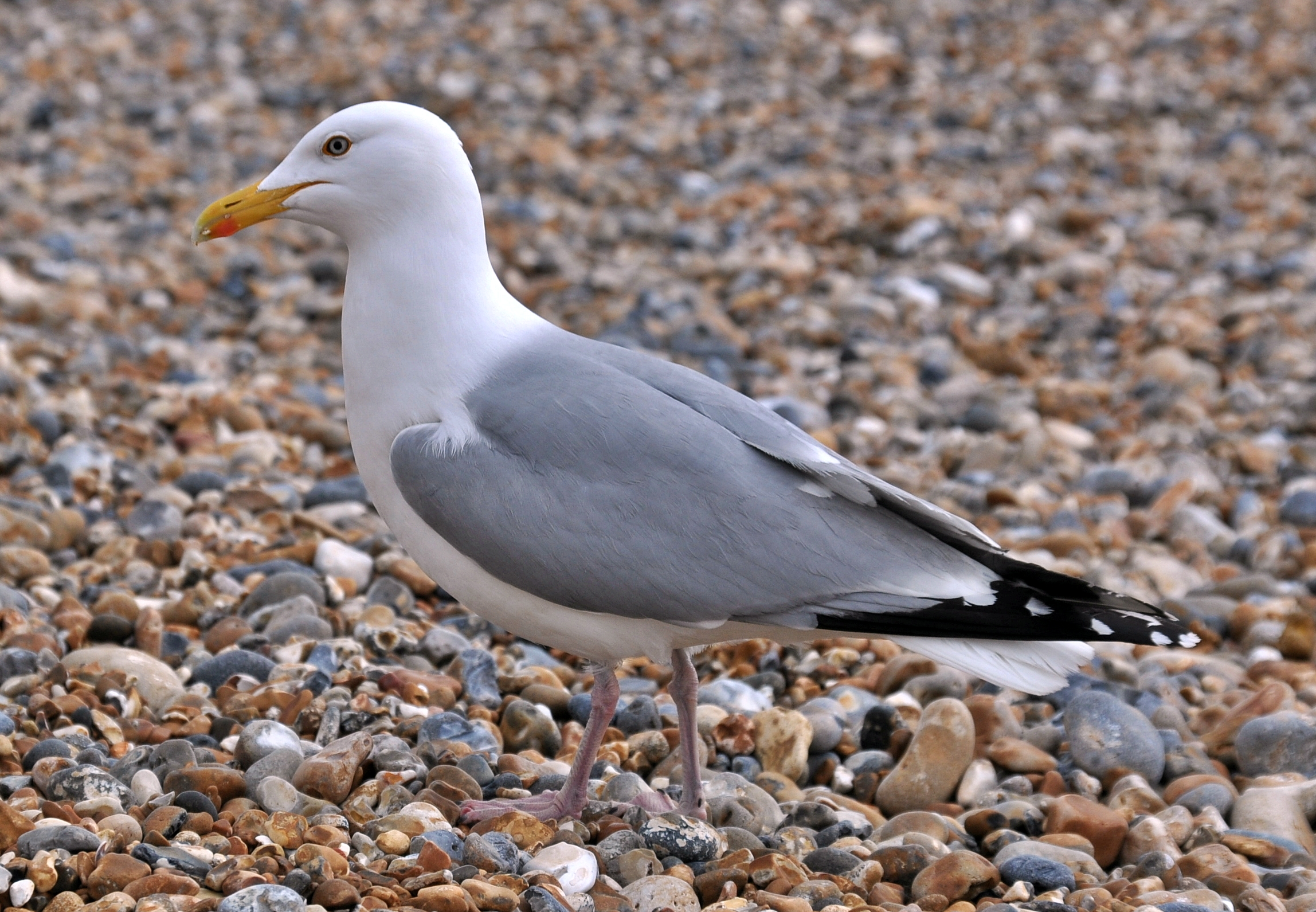
- Adult European herring gull

Scientific classification
- Kingdom: Animalia
- Phylum: Chordata
- Class: Aves
- Order: Charadriiformes
- Family: Laridae
- Subfamily: Larinae

Genera
- 11, see below

= Gull =

Gull (informally, seagull) Temporal range: Early Oligocene – Present

Subfamily of seabirds

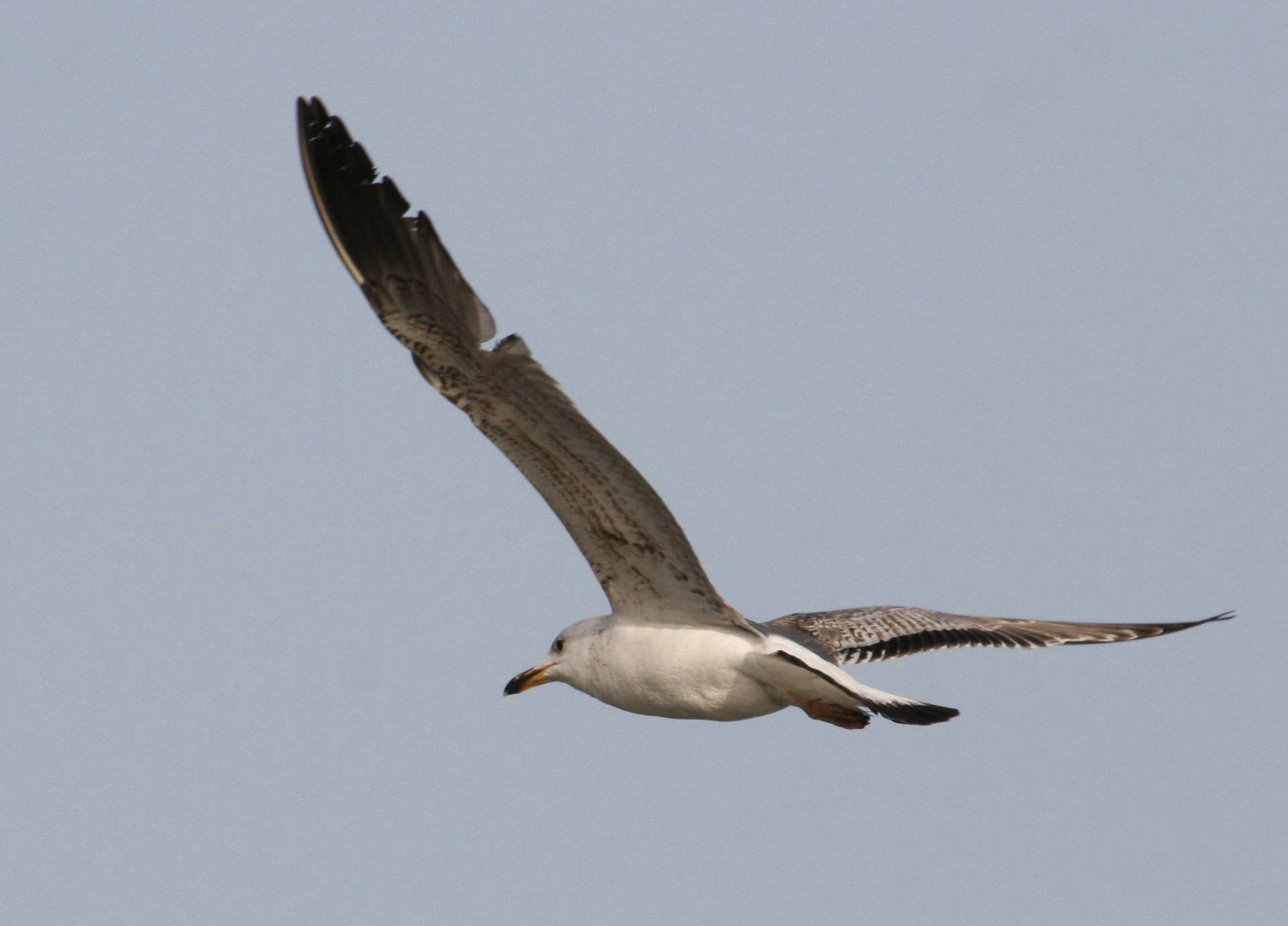
Immature (probably 2nd year) Armenian gull in flight, flying over Lake Sevan

Gulls, informally called seagulls (see Taxonomy), are seabirds of the subfamily Larinae. They are most closely related to terns and skimmers, and are placed with them in the family Laridae. They are also related, more distantly, to auks and skuas, and more distantly still to waders. Until the 21st century, most gulls were placed in the genus Larus, but that arrangement is now considered polyphyletic, leading to the readoption and revision of several genera.

An older name for gulls is mew; this still exists in certain regional English dialects and is cognate with German Möwe, Danish måge, Swedish mås, Dutch meeuw, Norwegian måke/måse, and French mouette; both 'gull' and 'mew' are ultimately onomatopoeic in origin, derived from the calls of the birds.

Gulls are usually grey and white, often with black markings on the head or wings, strong bills, and all have webbed feet. They normally have harsh mewing, wailing, or squawking calls. Most gulls are ground-nesting piscivores or carnivores which take live food or scavenge opportunistically, particularly the larger species in the genus Larus. Live food includes crustaceans, molluscs, fish, and for the larger species, birds and mammals. Gulls' jaws can unhinge to allow them to consume large prey. They are typically coastal or inshore (or even inland) species, rarely venturing far out to sea, except the kittiwakes and Sabine's gull. The large species take up to four years to attain full adult plumage, but two years is typical for small gulls. Large white-headed gulls are usually long-lived birds, with a maximum age of 49 years recorded for the European herring gull.

Gulls nest in large, often densely packed, noisy colonies. They lay two or three speckled eggs in nests composed of vegetation. The young are precocial, born with dark mottled down and mobile upon hatching. Gulls are resourceful, inquisitive, and intelligent, the larger species in particular, demonstrating complex methods of communication and a highly developed social structure. For example, many gull colonies display mobbing behaviour, attacking and harassing predators and other intruders. Certain species, such as the herring gull, have exhibited tool-use behaviour, for example using pieces of bread as bait with which to catch goldfish. Many species of gulls have learned to coexist successfully with humans and thrive in human habitats. Others rely on kleptoparasitism to get their food. Gulls have been observed preying on live whales, landing on the whale as it surfaces and pecking out pieces of flesh.

== Description and morphology ==
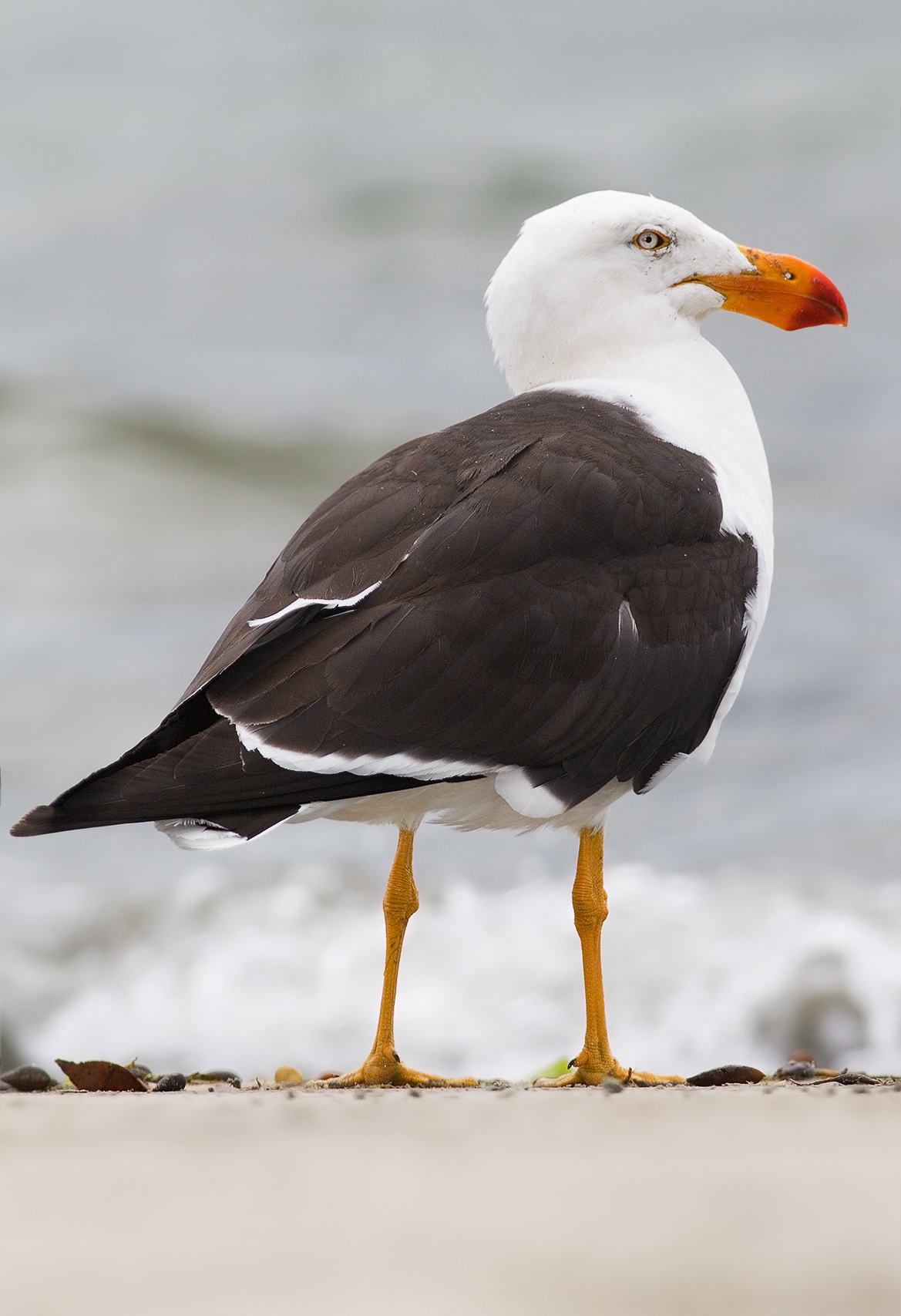
The Pacific gull is a large white-headed gull with a distinctively heavy bill.

Gulls range in size from the little gull, at 120 grams (4 1/4 ounces) and 29 centimetres (11 1/2 inches), to the great black-backed gull, at 1.75 kg (3 lb 14 oz) and 76 cm (30 in). They are generally uniform in shape, with heavy bodies, long wing, and moderately long necks. The tails of all but three species are rounded; the exceptions being Sabine's gull and swallow-tailed gull, which have forked tails, and Ross's gull, which has a wedge-shaped tail. Gulls have moderately long legs, especially when compared to the similar terns, with fully webbed feet. The bill is generally heavy and slightly hooked, with the larger species having stouter bills than the smaller species. The bill colour is often yellow with a red spot for the larger white-headed species and red, dark red or black in the smaller species.

Gulls are generalist species that can thrive in various environments and survive on a widely varied diet. They are the least specialised of all the seabirds, and their morphology allows for equal adeptness in swimming, flying, and walking. They are more adept walking on land than most other seabirds, and the smaller gulls tend to be more manoeuvrable while walking. The walking gait of gulls includes a slight side to side motion, something that can be exaggerated in breeding displays. In the air, they are able to hover and they are also able to take off quickly with little space.

The general pattern of plumage in adult gulls is a white body with a darker mantle; the extent to which the mantle is darker varies from pale grey to black. A few species vary in this, the ivory gull is entirely white, and some like the lava gull and Heermann's gull have partly or entirely grey bodies. The wingtips of most species are black, which improves their resistance to wear and tear, usually with a diagnostic pattern of white markings on or near the primary feather tips. The head of a gull may be covered by a dark hood or be entirely white. The plumage of the head varies between breeding and non-breeding seasons. In dark-hooded gulls, the hood is lost out of the breeding season, usually leaving a diffuse dark spot or mask through or behind the eye; in white-headed gulls, nonbreeding heads often have dark streaking on the head and neck.

== Distribution and habitat ==
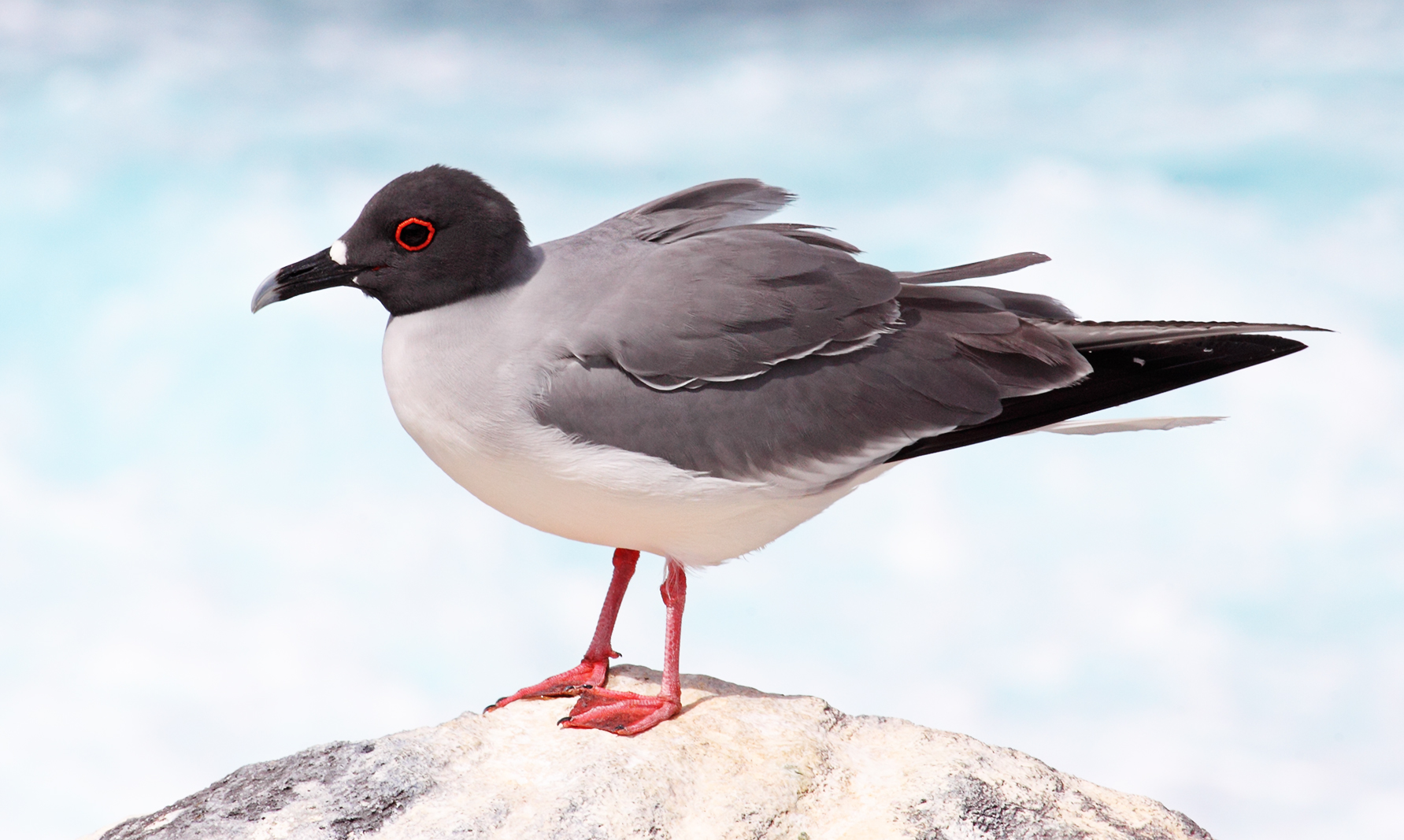
Swallow-tailed gulls are endemic to the Galapagos Islands.

Gulls have a worldwide cosmopolitan distribution. They breed on every continent, including the margins of Antarctica, and are even found in the high Arctic. They are less common in the tropics, although a few species do live on tropical islands such as the Galapagos and New Caledonia. Many species breed in coastal colonies, with a preference for islands.

Many gull species are migratory, with birds moving to warmer habitats during the winter, but the extent to which they migrate varies by species. Some migrate long distances, notably Sabine's gull, which migrates from the Arctic coasts to wintering grounds off the west coasts of South America and southern Africa, and Franklin's gull, which migrates from Canada to winter off the west coast of South America. Other species move much shorter distances and may simply disperse along the coasts near their breeding sites.

Gulls in the coat of arms of Haugesund

A big influence on non-breeding gull distribution is the availability of food patches. Human fisheries especially have an impact, since they often provide an abundant and predictable food resource. Two species of gulls particularly dependent on human fisheries are Audouin's gull (Ichthyaetus audouinii) and lesser black-backed gulls (Larus fuscus); their breeding distributions (especially the black-backed gull) are heavily impacted by human fishing discards and fishing ports.

Other environmental drivers that structure bird habitat and distribution are human activity and climate impacts. For example, waterbird distribution in Mediterranean wetlands is influenced by changes in salinity, water depth, water body isolation and hydroperiod, all of which have been observed to affect the bird community structure in both a species- and guild-specific way. Gulls in particular have high associations with salinity levels, which were found to be the main environmental predictor for waterbird assemblage.

Despite the "sea" in the informal English name "seagull", species may breed and feed in marine, freshwater, or terrestrial habitats, including away from the sea. One particular species, the grey gull, breeds in the interior of dry deserts far from water. Inland cities with known gull populations include: Saint Paul, Minnesota; Minsk, Belarus; Frankfurt, Germany; and Alice Springs, Australia.

== Behaviour ==
=== Diet and feeding ===
Hartlaub's gull foot paddling, Cape Town

Like all Charadriiform birds, gulls can drink salt water, as well as fresh water, as they possess exocrine glands located in supraorbital grooves of the skull by which salt can be excreted through the nostrils, to assist the kidneys in maintaining electrolyte balance. Gulls are highly adaptable feeders that take a wide range of prey opportunistically. The food taken by gulls includes fish, and marine and freshwater invertebrates, both alive and already dead; terrestrial arthropods and invertebrates such as insects and earthworms; rodents, eggs, carrion, offal, reptiles, amphibians, seeds, fruit, human refuse, and even other birds. No gull species is a single-prey specialist, and no gull species forages using only a single method. The type of food depends on circumstances; terrestrial prey, e.g. seeds, fruit and earthworms, is more common during the breeding season, while marine prey is more common in the nonbreeding season when birds spend more time on large bodies of water.

Black-tailed gulls following a ferry in Matsushima, Japan

Gulls not only take a wide range of prey, they also display great versatility in how they obtain it; prey can be caught in the air, on water, or on land. A number of hooded species are able to hawk insects on the wing, although the larger species perform this feat more rarely. Gulls on the wing snatch items both off the water and off the ground, and they are able to plunge-dive into water to catch prey. Smaller species are more manoeuvrable and better able to hover-dip fish from the air. Dipping is common when birds are sitting on the water, and gulls may swim in tight circles or foot paddle to bring marine invertebrates up to the surface.

Food is also obtained by searching the ground, often on the shore among sand, mud or rocks. Larger gulls tend to do more feeding in this way. Gulls may also engage in foot paddling in shallow water for invertebrates or on wet grass for earthworms. One method of obtaining prey involves dropping heavy shells of clams and mussels onto hard surfaces. Gulls may fly some distance to find a suitable surface on which to drop shells, and there is evidently a learned component to the task because older birds are more successful than younger birds. While overall feeding success is a function of age, the diversity in both prey and feeding methods is not. The time taken to learn foraging skills may explain the delayed maturation in gulls.

Gulls have only a limited ability to dive below the water surface to feed on deeper prey. To obtain prey from a greater depth, many species of gulls feed in association with other animals, where marine hunters drive prey to the surface when hunting. Examples of such associations include four species of gulls that feed around plumes of mud brought to the surface by feeding grey whales, and also between orcas (the largest dolphin species) and kelp gulls (among other seabirds).

Looking at the effect of humans on gull diet, overfishing of target prey such as sardines have caused a shift in diet and behaviour. Analysis of the yellow-legged gull's (Larus michahellis) pellets off the northwest coast of Spain has revealed a shift from a sardine to crustacean-based diet. This shift was linked to higher fishing efficiency and thus overall fish stock depletion. Lastly, closure of nearby open-air landfills limited food availability for the gulls, further creating a stress on their shift in diet. From 1974 to 1994, yellow-legged gull populations on Berlenga Island, Portugal, increased from 2600 to 44,698 individuals. In an analysis of both adult and chick food remains, researchers found a mixture of both natural prey and human refuse. The gulls in this study relied substantially on the Henslow's swimming crab (Polybius henslowii). In times when local prey availability is low, the gulls shift to human-related food. These temporal shifts from marine to terrestrial prey highlight the resilience of adult gulls and their ability to keep chick condition consistent. Human disturbance has also been shown to have an effect on gull breeding, in which hatching failure is directly proportional to the amount of disturbance in a given plot. Some gulls have been known to eat the eyeballs of baby seals, and directly pilfer milk from the teats of elephant seals.

=== Breeding ===
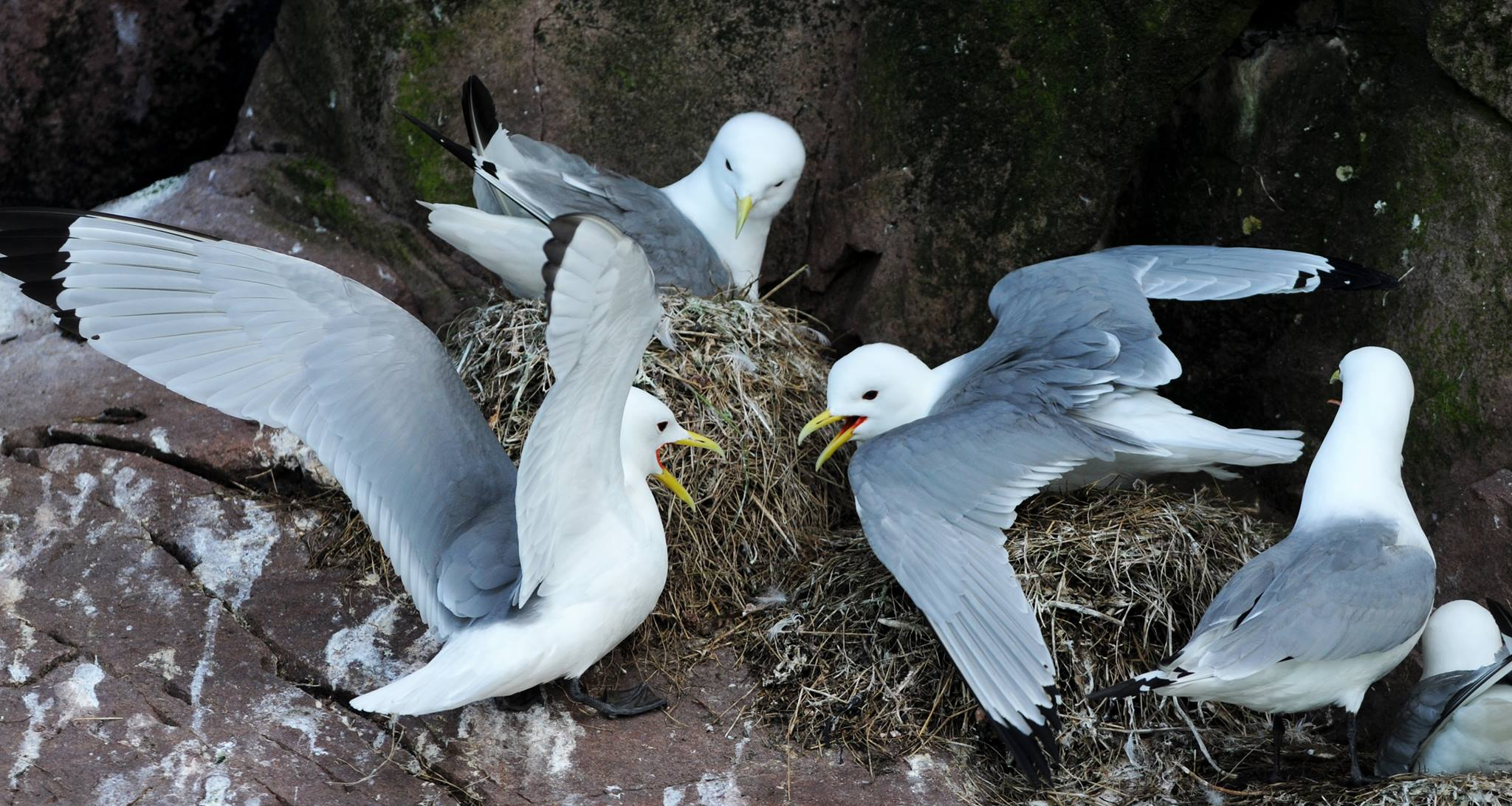
Black-legged kittiwakes nest colonially, but have tiny, closely packed territories.

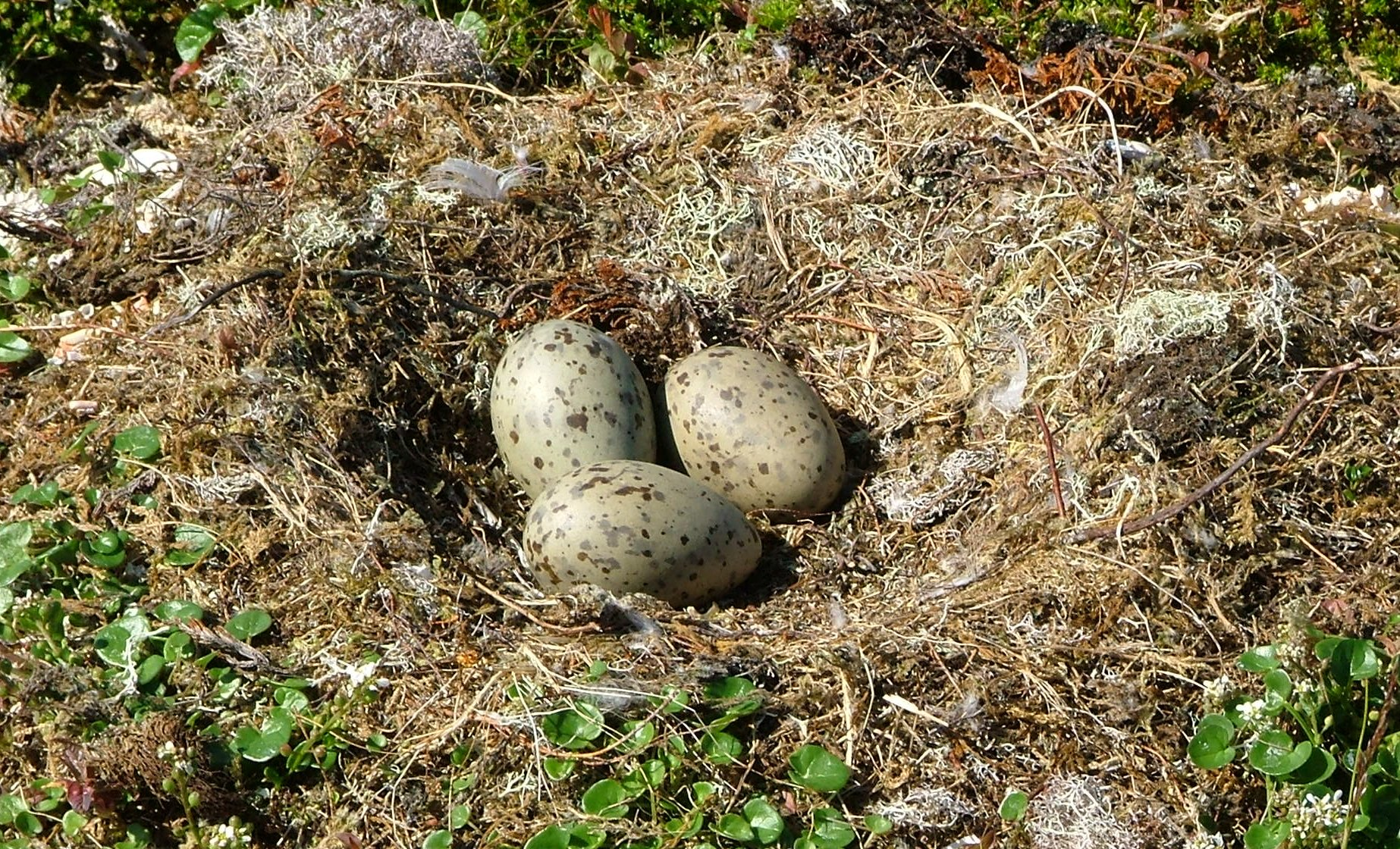
The nest of a great black-backed gull, with three typical eggs

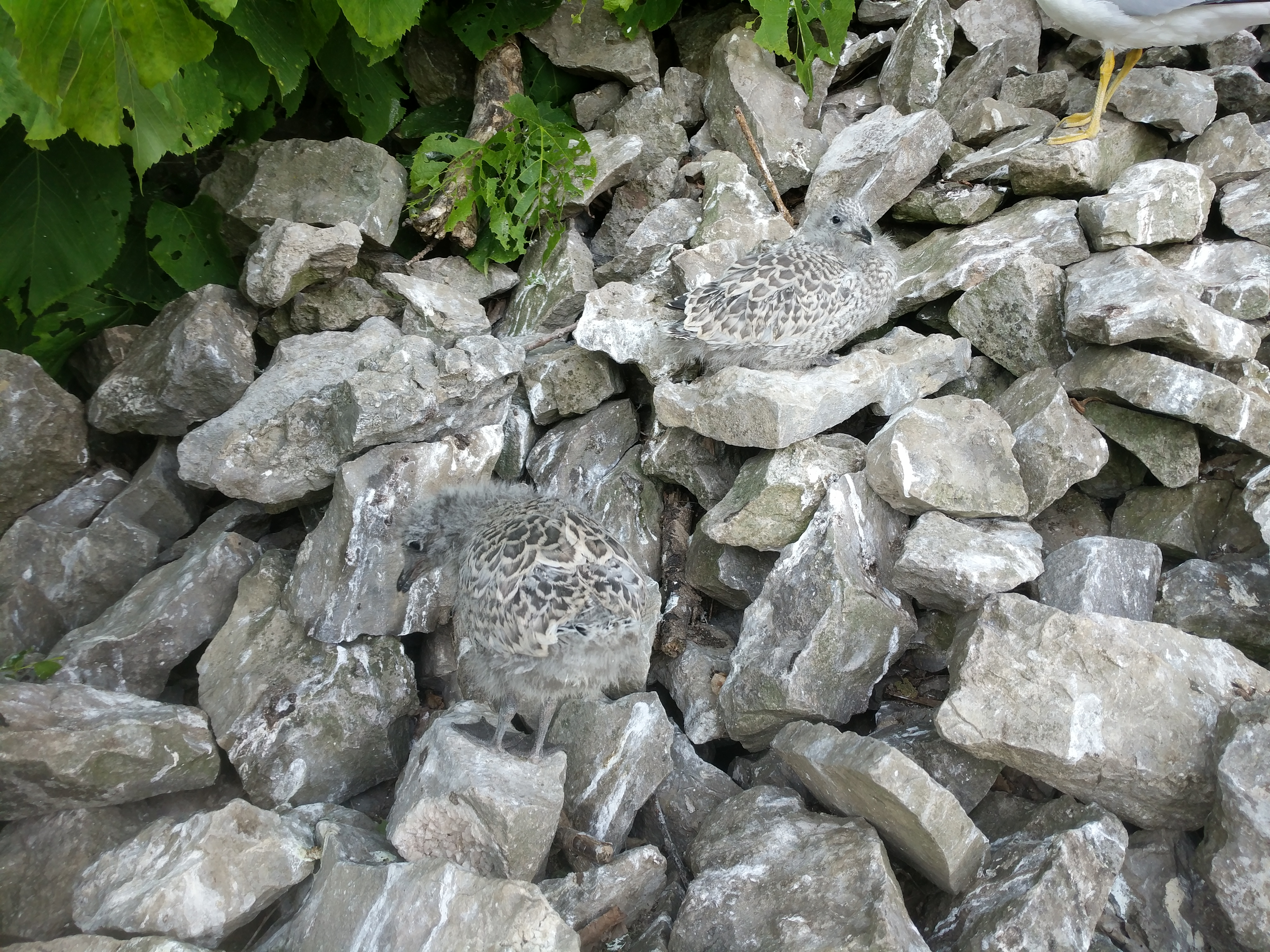
Two ring-billed gull chicks sitting amongst rocks

Gulls are monogamous and colonial breeders that display mate fidelity which normally lasts for the life of the pair. Divorce of mated pairs does occur, but it apparently has a social cost that persists for a number of years after the break-up. Gulls also display high levels of site fidelity, returning to the same colony after breeding there once and even usually breeding at the same location within that colony. Gull colonies can vary from just a few pairs to over a hundred thousand pairs, and may be exclusive to that gull species or shared with other seabird species. A few species nest singly, and single pairs of band-tailed gulls may breed in colonies of other bird species. Within colonies, gull pairs are territorial, defending an area of varying size around the nesting site from others of their species. This area can be as large as a 5-metre radius around the nest in the European herring gull to just a tiny area of cliff ledge in the kittiwakes.

Most gulls breed once a year and have predictable breeding seasons lasting for three to five months. Gulls begin to assemble around the colony for a few weeks prior to occupying it. Existing pairs re-establish their pair bonds, and unpaired birds begin courting. Pairs then move back into their territories, and new males establish new territories and attempt to court females. Gulls defend their territories from rivals of both sexes using calls and aerial attacks.

Nest building is an important part of the pair-bonding process. Most gull nests are mats of herbaceous matter with a central nest cup. Nests are usually built on the ground, but a few species establish their nests on cliffs (the usual preference for kittiwakes), and some choose to nest high in trees (notably Bonaparte's gull). Species that nest in marshes need to construct a nesting platform to keep the nest dry, particularly species that nest in tidal marshes. Both sexes gather nesting material and build the nest, but the division of labour is not always exactly equal. In coastal towns, many gulls nest on rooftops and can be observed by nearby human residents.

Clutch size is typically three eggs, although some of the smaller gulls only lay two, and the swallow-tailed gull only produces a single egg. Birds synchronise their laying within colonies, with a higher level of synchronisation in larger colonies. The eggs of gulls are usually dark tan to brown or dark olive with dark splotches and scrawl markings, so they are well camouflaged. Both sexes incubate the eggs; incubation bouts last between one and four hours during the day, and one parent incubates through the night. Research on various bird species, including gulls, suggests that females form pair bonds with other females to obtain alloparental care for their dependent offspring, a behaviour seen in other animal species, such as elephants, wolves, and the fathead minnow.

Incubation begins after the first egg is laid but is not continuous until after the second egg is laid, meaning that the first two chicks hatch at about the same time, and the third a day later; hatching is typically between 22 and 28 days, with little variation between species, the smallest only slightly shorter than the largest (little gull, 23–25 days; great black-backed gull, 27–28 days). Young chicks are brooded by their parents for about one or two weeks, and often at least one parent stays behind to guard the chicks until they fledge. Although the chicks are fed by both parents, early on in the rearing period the male does most of the feeding and the female most of the brooding and guarding.

== Gallery ==
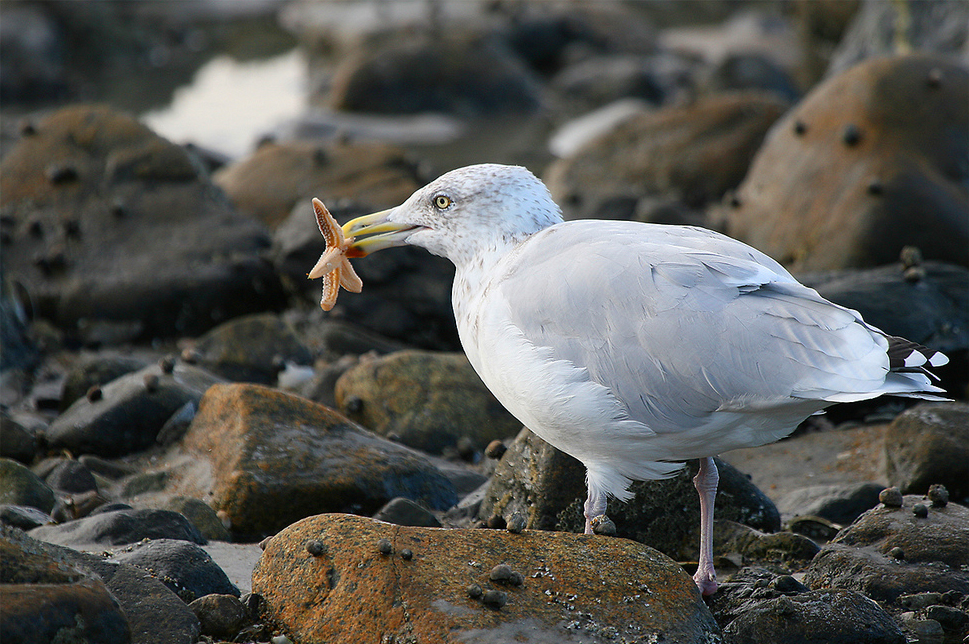
American herring gull eating a starfish at Plum Island Nature Preserve, Massachusetts, US

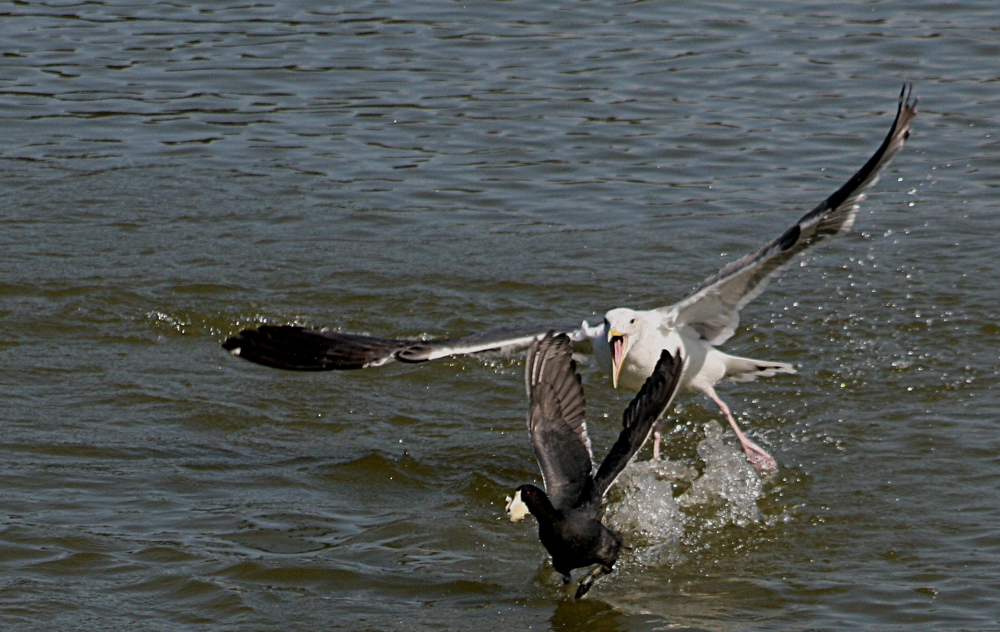
Western gull attacking an American coot. The gull is probably trying to steal food from the coot's bill.

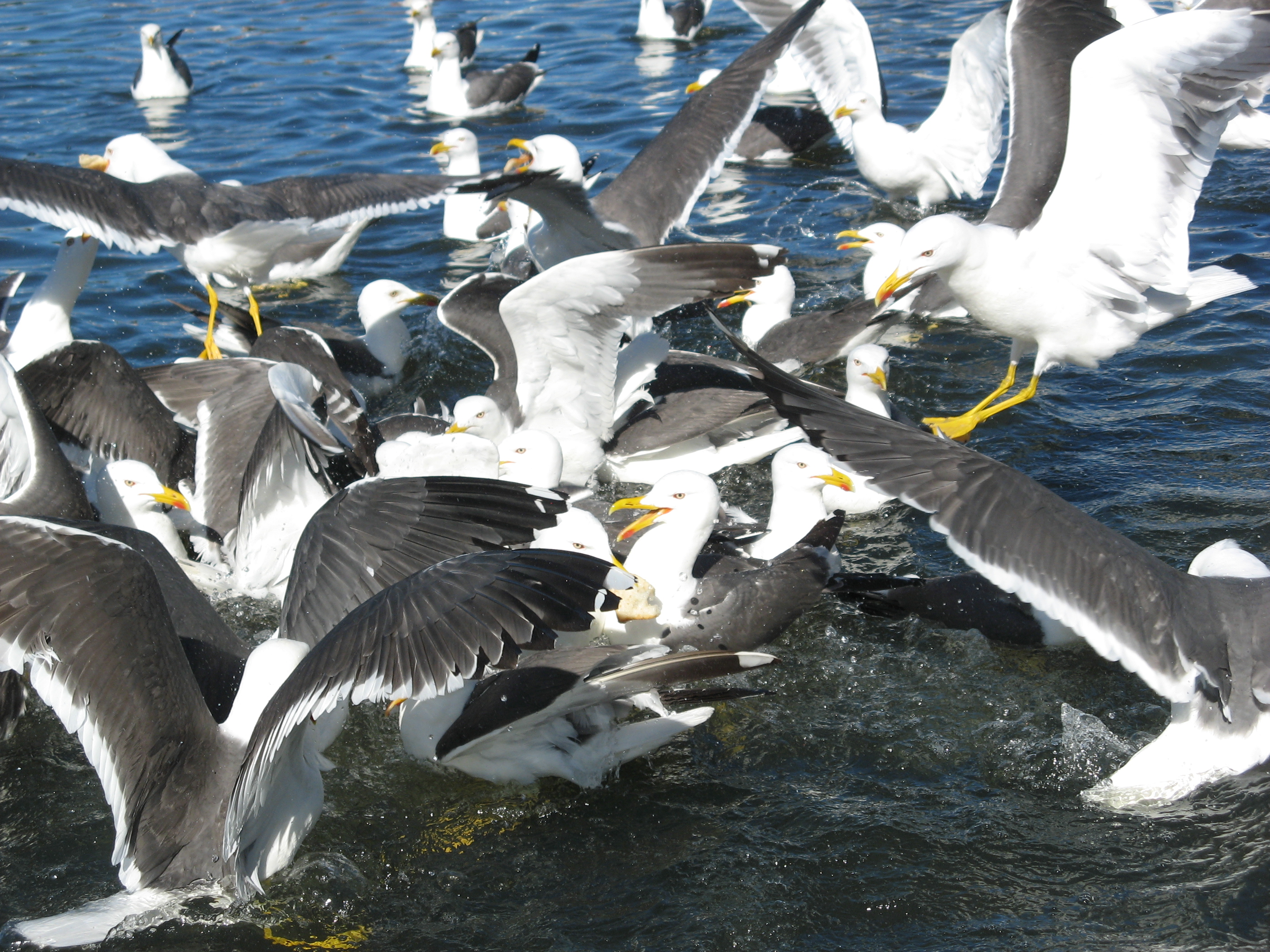
Lesser black-backed gulls in a feeding frenzy

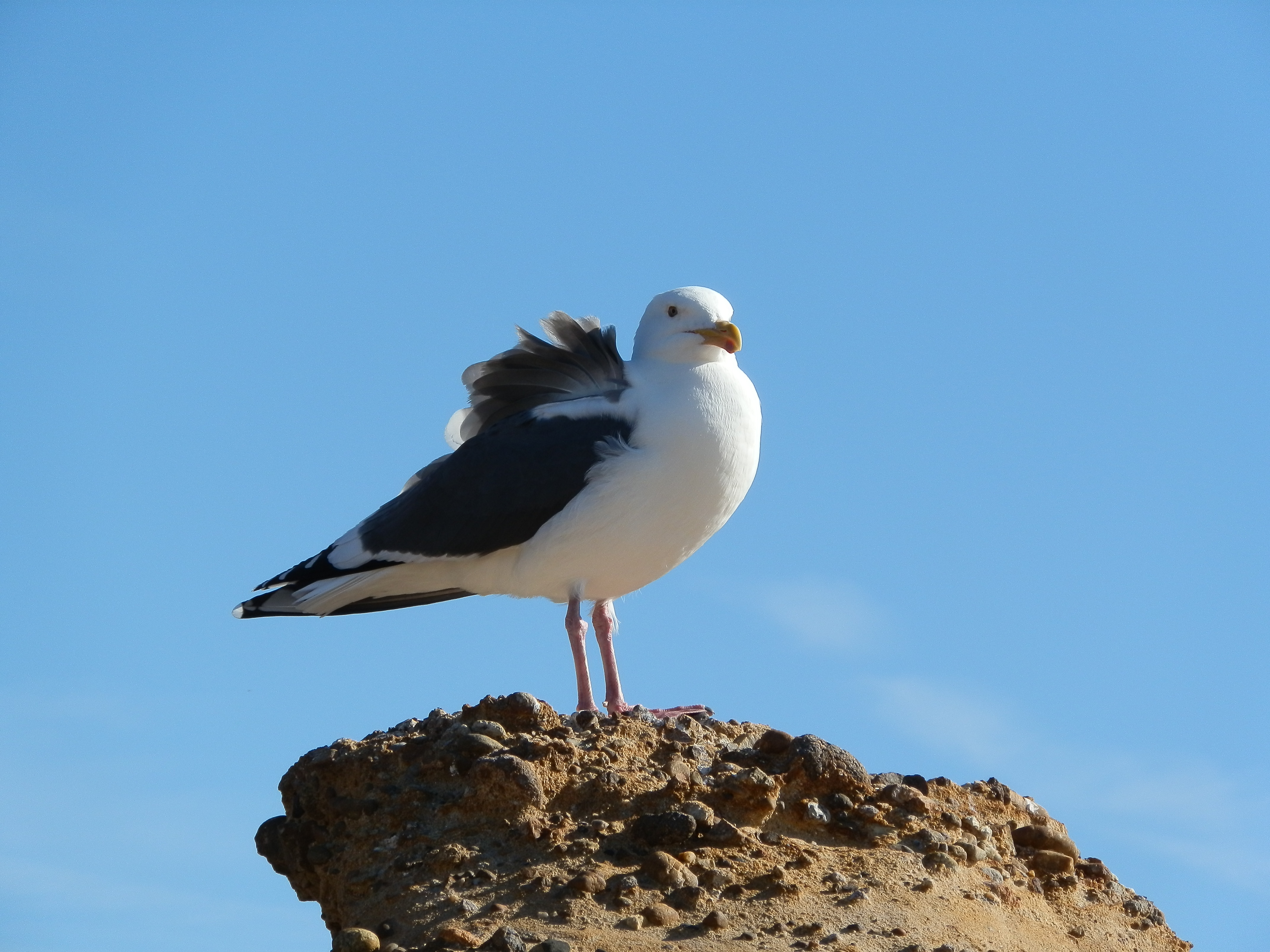
Western gull at Point Lobos State Natural Reserve, California, US

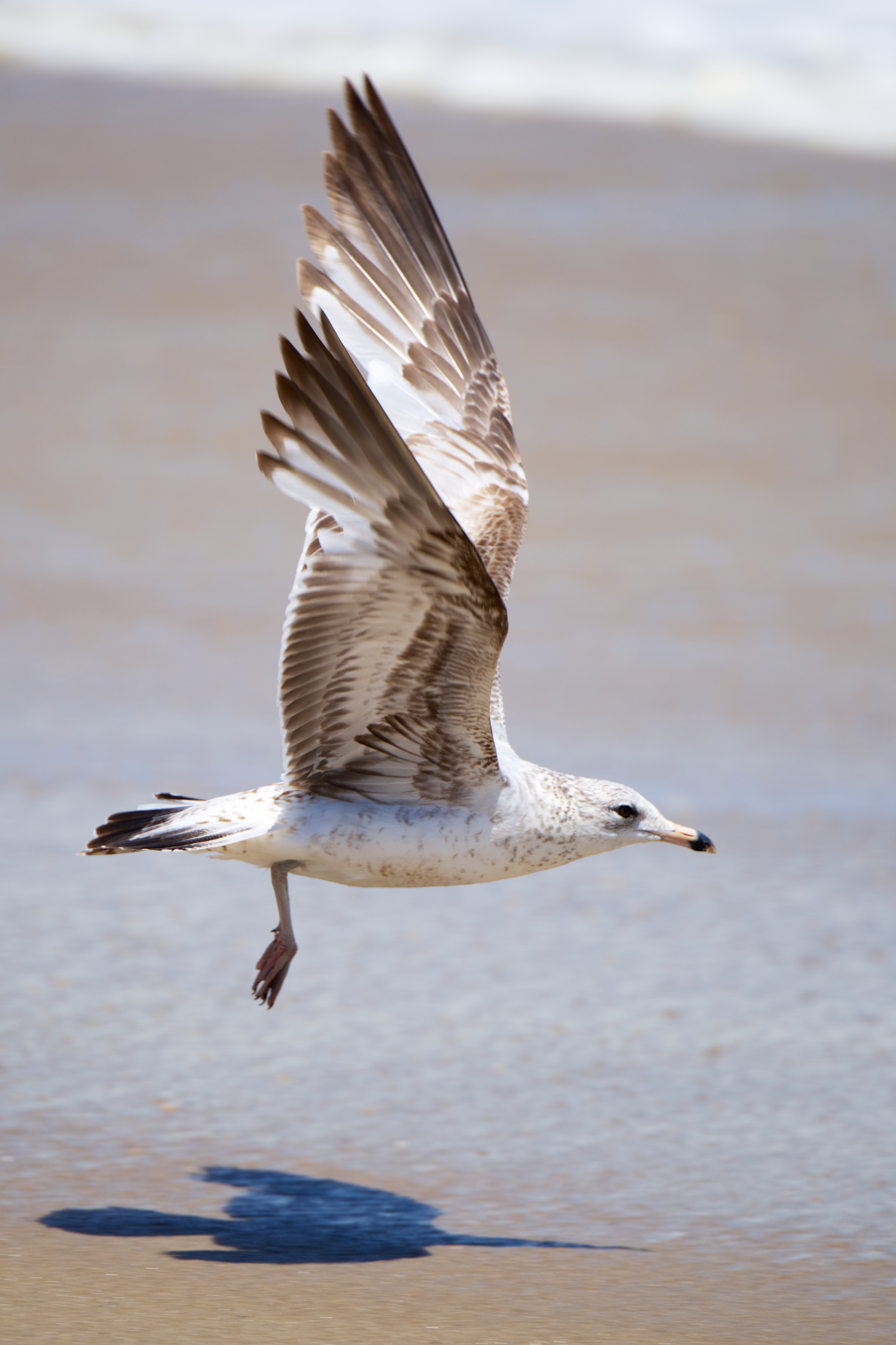
Immature (first-summer, one year old) ring-billed gull, Sandy Hook shore, New Jersey, US

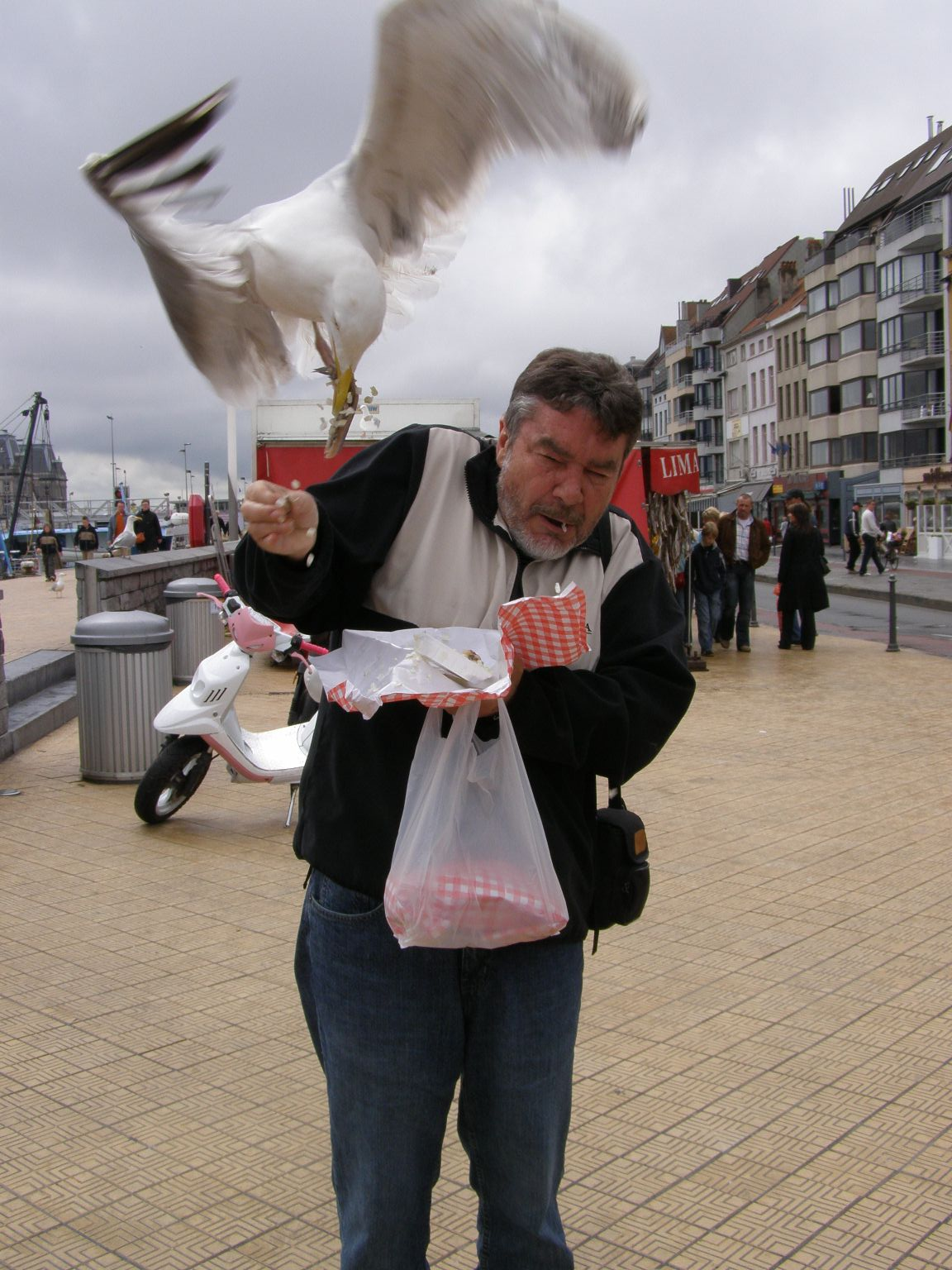
European herring gull stealing food from a man's hand, Ostend, Belgium

A gull resting on a fence in Depoe Bay, Oregon.

== Taxonomy ==
The family Laridae was introduced (as Laridia) by the French polymath Constantine Samuel Rafinesque in 1815. The taxonomy of gulls is confused by their widespread distribution zones of hybridisation leading to gene flow. Some have traditionally been considered ring species, but research has suggested that this assumption is questionable. Before the 21st century, most gulls were placed in the genus Larus, but this arrangement is now known to be polyphyletic, leading to the resurrection of the genera Ichthyaetus, Chroicocephalus, Leucophaeus, Saundersilarus, and Hydrocoloeus. Some English names refer to species complexes within the group:

- Large white-headed gull is used to describe the 20 or so herring gull-like species in the genus Larus, from Ring-billed gull to Iceland gull in the taxonomic list below.
- White-winged gull is used as a nickname for the two high Arctic-breeding species within the former group with no black in their wingtips; these are glaucous gull and Iceland gull. Mediterranean gull, in the genus Ichthyaetus, also has no black in the wingtips in adults and can be called "white-winged".

In common usage, members of various gull species are often referred to as 'seagulls' or 'sea gulls'; however, this is a layperson's term and often not used by ornithologists and biologists. The name is used informally to refer to a common local species (or all gulls in general) and has no fixed taxonomic meaning. In common usage, gull-like seabirds that are not technically gulls (e.g. albatrosses, fulmars, terns, and skuas) may also be referred to as 'seagulls' by the layperson.

Early 21st century research usually treated the gulls as a distinct family Laridae separate from the terns in the family Sternidae. Subsequent research resulted in the merger of these two into just one family given uncertainty over the taxonomic status of the noddies, traditionally considered terns but seemingly basal in the whole group; a taxonomy that was followed by the IOC World Bird List for several years up to 2023. More comprehensive molecular phylogenetic analysis by Černý et al. in 2022 has however now shown that the noddies are basal only to the other terns, not the whole family; this was followed by the IOC World Bird List from version 14.1 in 2024. Despite this resolution of gulls and terns as separate monophyletic groups after all, they have remained placed together as subfamilies in a broad Laridae in the most recent Avilist classification.

The study published by Černý et al. found the following relationships between the genera, including the most recent generic change, the placement of Saunders's gull in its own genus Saundersilarus.

- Gulls
  - - Creagrus – swallow-tailed gull
    - - Hydrocoloeus – little gull
      - Rhodostethia – Ross's gull
  - - - Rissa – kittiwakes (2 species)
      - - Xema – Sabine's gull
        - Pagophila – ivory gull
    - - Saundersilarus – Saunders's gull
      - - Chroicocephalus – (10 species)
        - - Leucophaeus – (5 species)
          - - Ichthyaetus – (6 species)
            - Larus – (25 species)

== List of species ==
This is a list of the 54 gull species, listed in the taxonomic sequence used by the Avilist.

Image	Genus	Species
	Creagrus Bonaparte, 1854	Swallow-tailed gull Creagrus furcatus
	Hydrocoloeus Kaup, 1829 (may include Rhodostethia)	Little gull Hydrocoloeus minutus
	Rhodostethia MacGillivray, 1842	Ross's gull Rhodostethia rosea
	Rissa Stephens, 1826	Red-legged kittiwake Rissa brevirostris; Black-legged kittiwake Rissa tridactyla
	Xema Leach, 1819	Sabine's gull Xema sabini
	Pagophila Kaup, 1829	Ivory gull Pagophila eburnea
	Saundersilarus Dwight, 1926	Saunders's gull, Saundersilarus saundersi
	Chroicocephalus Eyton, 1836	Slender-billed gull Chroicocephalus genei; Bonaparte's gull Chroicocephalus philadelphia; Black-headed gull Chroicocephalus ridibundus; Brown-headed gull Chroicocephalus brunnicephalus; Hartlaub's gull Chroicocephalus hartlaubii; Grey-headed gull Chroicocephalus cirrocephalus; Brown-hooded gull Chroicocephalus maculipennis; Andean gull Chroicocephalus serranus; Black-billed gull Chroicocephalus bulleri; Silver gull Chroicocephalus novaehollandiae; Red-billed gull Chroicocephalus novaehollandiae scopulinus; †Huahine gull Chroicocephalus utunui
	Leucophaeus Bruch, 1853	Dolphin gull Leucophaeus scoresbii; Grey gull Leucophaeus modestus; Laughing gull Leucophaeus atricilla; Franklin's gull Leucophaeus pipixcan; Lava gull Leucophaeus fuliginosus
	Ichthyaetus Kaup, 1829	Pallas's gull (or Great black-headed gull) Ichthyaetus ichthyaetus; Relict gull Ichthyaetus relictus; Audouin's gull Ichthyaetus audouinii; Mediterranean gull Ichthyaetus melanocephalus; White-eyed gull Ichthyaetus leucophthalmus; Sooty gull Ichthyaetus hemprichii
	Larus Linnaeus, 1758	Pacific gull Larus pacificus; Belcher's gull Larus belcheri; Black-tailed gull Larus crassirostris; Olrog's gull Larus atlanticus; Heermann's gull Larus heermanni; Ring-billed gull Larus delawarensis; Short-billed gull Larus brachyrhynchus; Common gull Larus canus; Yellow-footed gull Larus livens; Western gull Larus occidentalis; Caspian gull Larus cachinnans; Kelp gull Larus dominicanus (or "southern black-backed gull" or "karoro" in New Zealand); Cape gull Larus dominicanus vetula; American herring gull Larus smithsonianus; Vega gull Larus vegae; Mongolian gull Larus mongolicus; European herring gull Larus argentatus; Yellow-legged gull Larus michahellis; Armenian gull Larus armenicus; Great black-backed gull Larus marinus; Glaucous gull Larus hyperboreus; Lesser black-backed gull Larus fuscus; Heuglin's gull Larus fuscus heuglini; California gull Larus californicus; Glaucous-winged gull Larus glaucescens; Slaty-backed gull Larus schistisagus; Iceland gull Larus glaucoides; Kumlien's gull Larus glaucoides kumlieni; Thayer's gull Larus glaucoides thayeri

== Evolutionary history ==
The Laridae are known from not-yet-published fossil evidence since the Early Oligocene, circa 30–33 million years ago. Three gull-like species were described by Alphonse Milne-Edwards from the early Miocene of Saint-Gérand-le-Puy, France. A fossil gull from the Middle to Late Miocene of Cherry County, Nebraska, US, is placed in the prehistoric genus Gaviota; apart from this and the undescribed Early Oligocene fossil, all prehistoric species were tentatively assigned to the modern genus Larus. Among those of them that have been confirmed as gulls, Milne-Edwards' "Larus" elegans and "L." totanoides from the Late Oligocene/Early Miocene of southeast France have since been separated in Laricola.
