= Faʻahia =

Archaeological site on Huahine, Society Islands, French Polynesia

Coordinates: 16°42′34″S 151°02′16″W

French map of Huahine with the location of the site shown as Faie

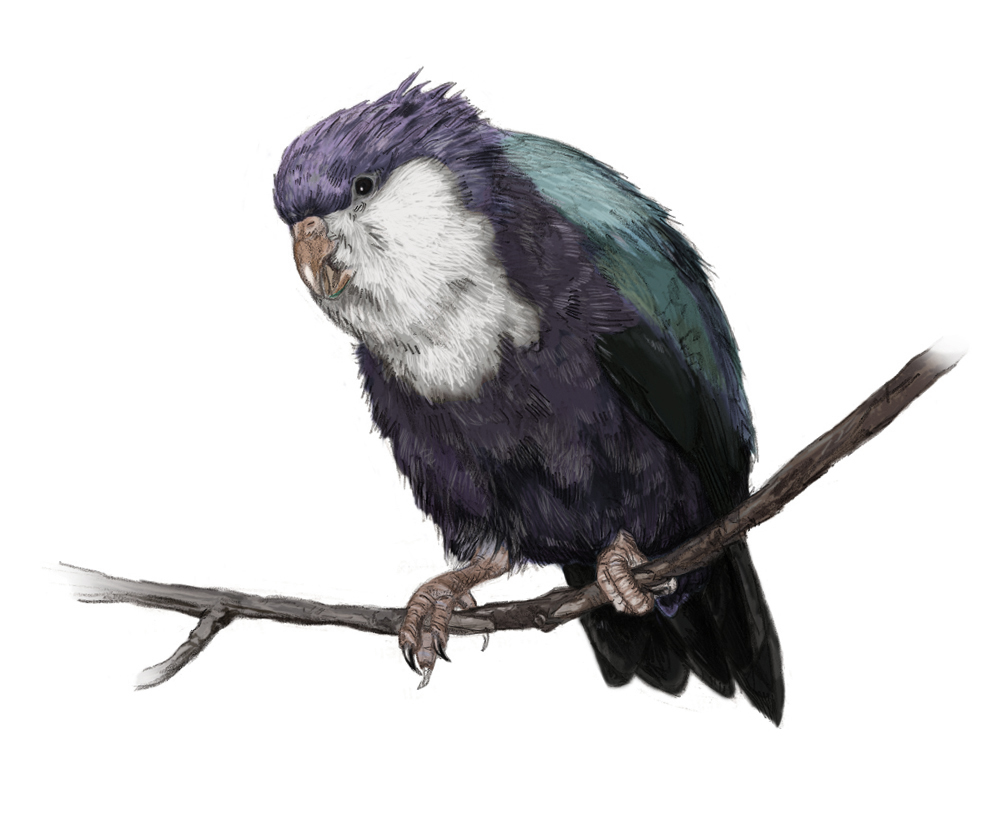
Subfossil remains of the extinct conquered lorikeet have been found at the site; the illustration shows a reconstruction of its appearance, with conjectural plumage colouration.

Faʻahia is an early Polynesian occupation site in the north-east of the island of Huahine, in the Society Islands, French Polynesia. With the neighbouring Vaitoʻotia site, it dates to between 700 CE and 1200 CE. Because much of the site is waterlogged, artefacts made of organic materials have been well preserved, including wooden patu hand clubs, canoe parts and adze handles.

Subfossil bird bones have also been well preserved, providing much new information about the avifauna of the island around the time it was first settled by humans, demonstrating that even small islands could hold a rich variety of bird species. Several excavations were conducted by Yosihiko H. Sinoto of the Bernice P. Bishop Museum.

== Birds ==
The remains of several species of birds have been found, representing those that were killed for their flesh, bones or feathers by prehistoric Polynesians. Globally extinct species of land birds found at the site include two rails, the Huahine rail and swamphen; two doves, the great ground dove and Huahine cuckoo-dove; two parrots, the conquered lorikeet and Sinoto's lorikeet, and the Huahine starling.

Locally extinct land birds found were striated heron, spotless crake, Polynesian ground dove, Marquesan imperial pigeon, Polynesian imperial pigeon, and Tahiti reed warbler. The only globally extinct seabird was the Huahine gull, but several other seabirds that are now locally extinct, at least as breeders, were found, including the wedge-tailed shearwater, Christmas shearwater, tropical shearwater, Tahiti petrel, Phoenix petrel, Trindade petrel, brown booby, red-footed booby, great frigatebird, lesser frigatebird, and black noddy.
