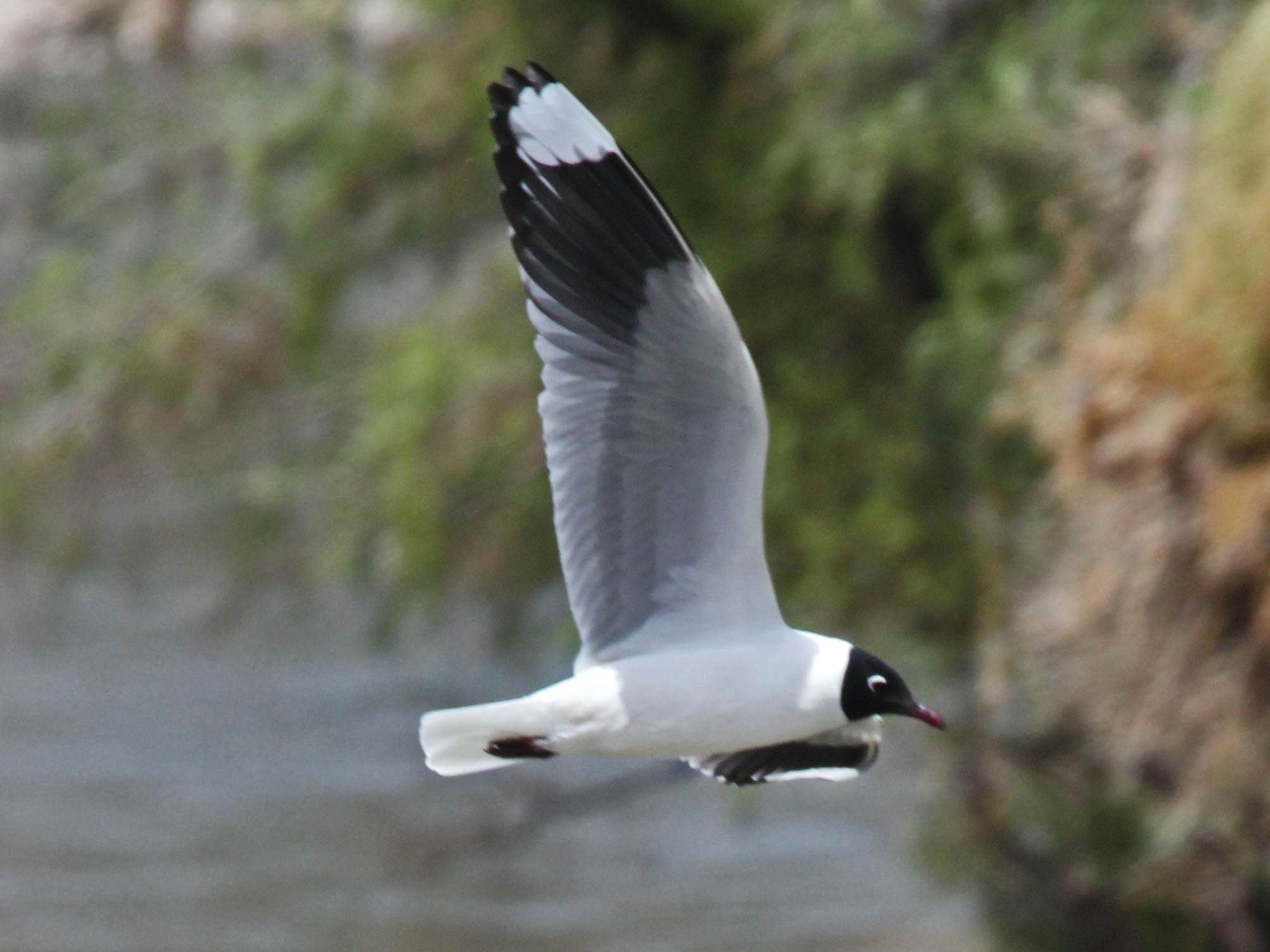
- Breeding plumage, Peru

Conservation status
- Least Concern (IUCN 3.1)

Scientific classification
- Kingdom: Animalia
- Phylum: Chordata
- Class: Aves
- Order: Charadriiformes
- Family: Laridae
- Genus: Chroicocephalus
- Species: C. serranus

Binomial name
- Chroicocephalus serranus (Tschudi, 1844)
- The range of Chroicocephalus serranus Breeding range Year-round range Wintering range

Synonyms
- Larus serranus

Audio

= Andean gull =

Species of bird

The Andean gull (Chroicocephalus serranus) is a species in subfamily Larinae of the family Laridae, the gulls, terns, and skimmers. It is found in Argentina, Bolivia, Chile, Colombia, Ecuador, and Peru.

== Taxonomy and systematics ==
The Andean gull was long placed in genus Larus. Genetic research has established that Larus sensu lato is paraphyletic so the American Ornithological Society, the International Ornithological Committee, and the Clements taxonomy moved it and 10 other gulls to genus Chroicocephalus. However, BirdLife International's Handbook of the Birds of the World retains all of them in Larus. The systems agree that the Andean gull is monotypic.

== Description ==
The Andean gull is 42 to 48 cm (17 to 19 in) long and weighs about 480 g (17 oz); it is one of the larger members of its genus. The sexes are alike. Adults in breeding plumage have a glossy black hood with a white crescent behind the eye and a mostly white body with a gray back and sometimes a pink flush on the underparts. Their tail is white. The upper side of their wing is mostly gray with an alternating white-black-white-black pattern on the primaries. The underside of their wing is pale gray with a blackish outer half but for large white "mirrors" on the three outermost primaries. Their bill, legs, and feet are blackish brown with a reddish tinge and their iris is brown. Non-breeding adults have a white head and blackish legs. The Andean gull takes two years to attain adult plumage. In its first year it has some mottled black on its head, a complex black and white pattern on the wings, and a black band near the end of the tail.

== Distribution and habitat ==
The Andean gull is found year-round in the Andes from far southwestern Colombia south through central Ecuador and Peru, western Bolivia, and eastern Chile and western Argentina to about the latitude of the north of Chile's Aysén Region. Many individuals winter on the coast from central Peru south into northern Chile, but it is not known if these are from the highlands to the east of there or from the southern part of its range. The species has been recorded as a vagrant in Amazonian Peru and far southern Argentina.

In its breeding season the Andean gull is found at lakes, bogs, marshes, and fields of the puna and páramo zones of the Altiplano. In elevation there it mostly ranges from 3,000 to 5,300 m (9,800 to 17,400 ft) but is found as low as 1,200 m (3,900 ft) in the southern part of its range. Wintering birds are typically found at river mouths and sand beaches along the coast.

== Behavior ==
=== Feeding ===
In the mountains the Andean gull feeds on earthworms, insects, amphibians, small fish, and occasionally eggs and chicks of waterbirds. In winter it also scavenges at ski resorts. Along the coast it feeds on offal, fish, and marine invertebrates. It walks, swims, and flies to seek food.

=== Breeding ===
The Andean gull breeds mostly during July and August. It sometimes breeds solitarily but more usually in small colonies. It nests along riverbanks, and on islands in rivers and lakes. The clutch size is usually two or three eggs, but one or four are sometimes laid. The incubation period, time to fledging, and details of parental care are not known.

=== Vocalization ===
The Andean gull's vocalizations include "agitated, sometimes tremulous "yeeer" calls" and "a hoarse "raggh-aggh-keeaagh" and other low raspy notes."

== Status ==
The IUCN has assessed the Andean gull as being of Least Concern. It has a large range but its population size and trend are not known. No immediate threats have been identified. "The species is probably vulnerable, with no large populations...breeding areas are in remote high-altitude lakes but many are increasingly subject to agricultural pressure and human disturbance."

== Gallery ==
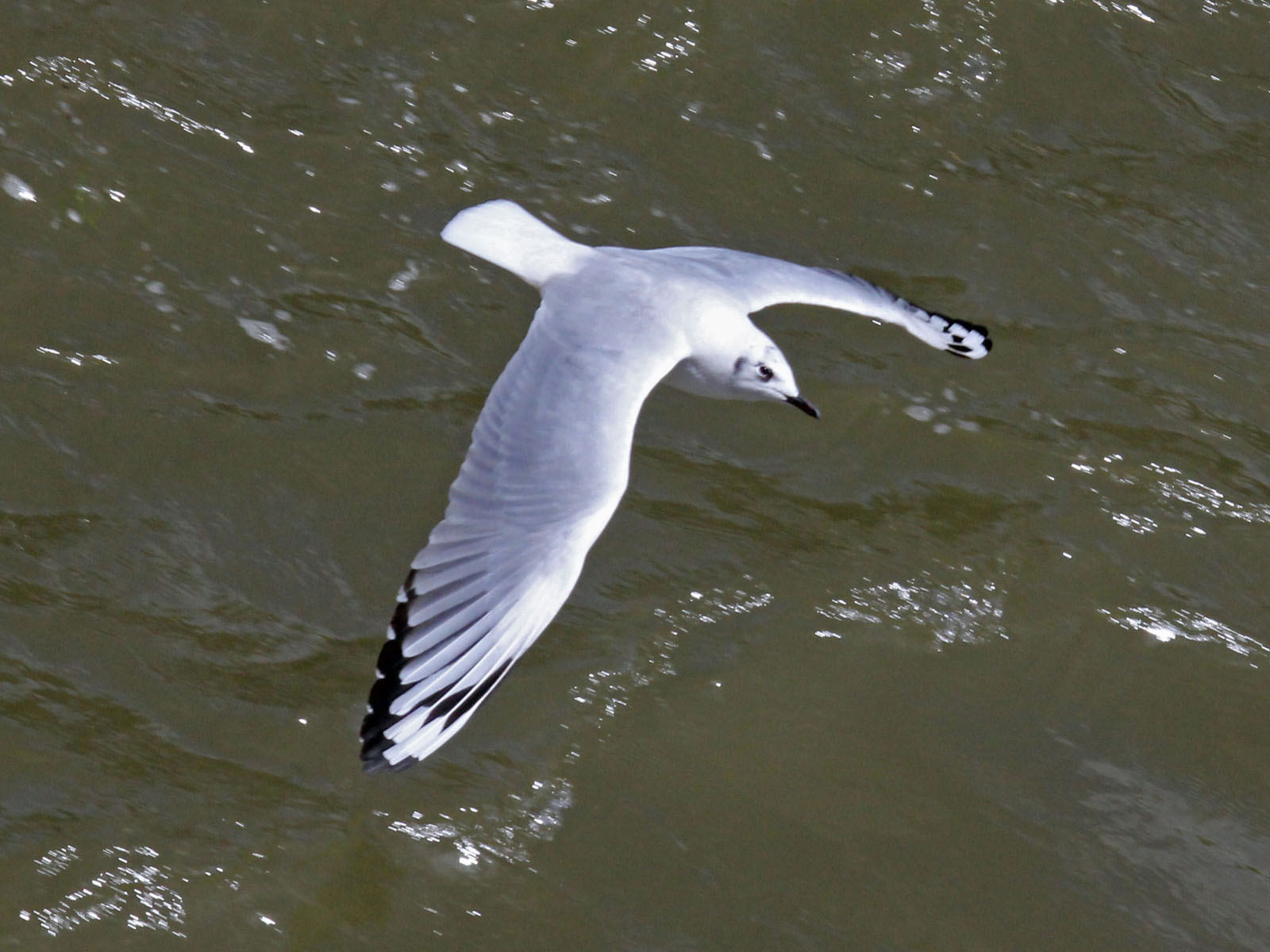
Nonbreeding plumage, Peru

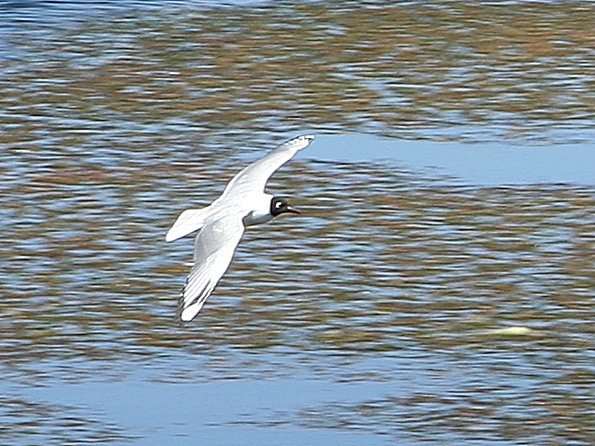
Breeding plumage

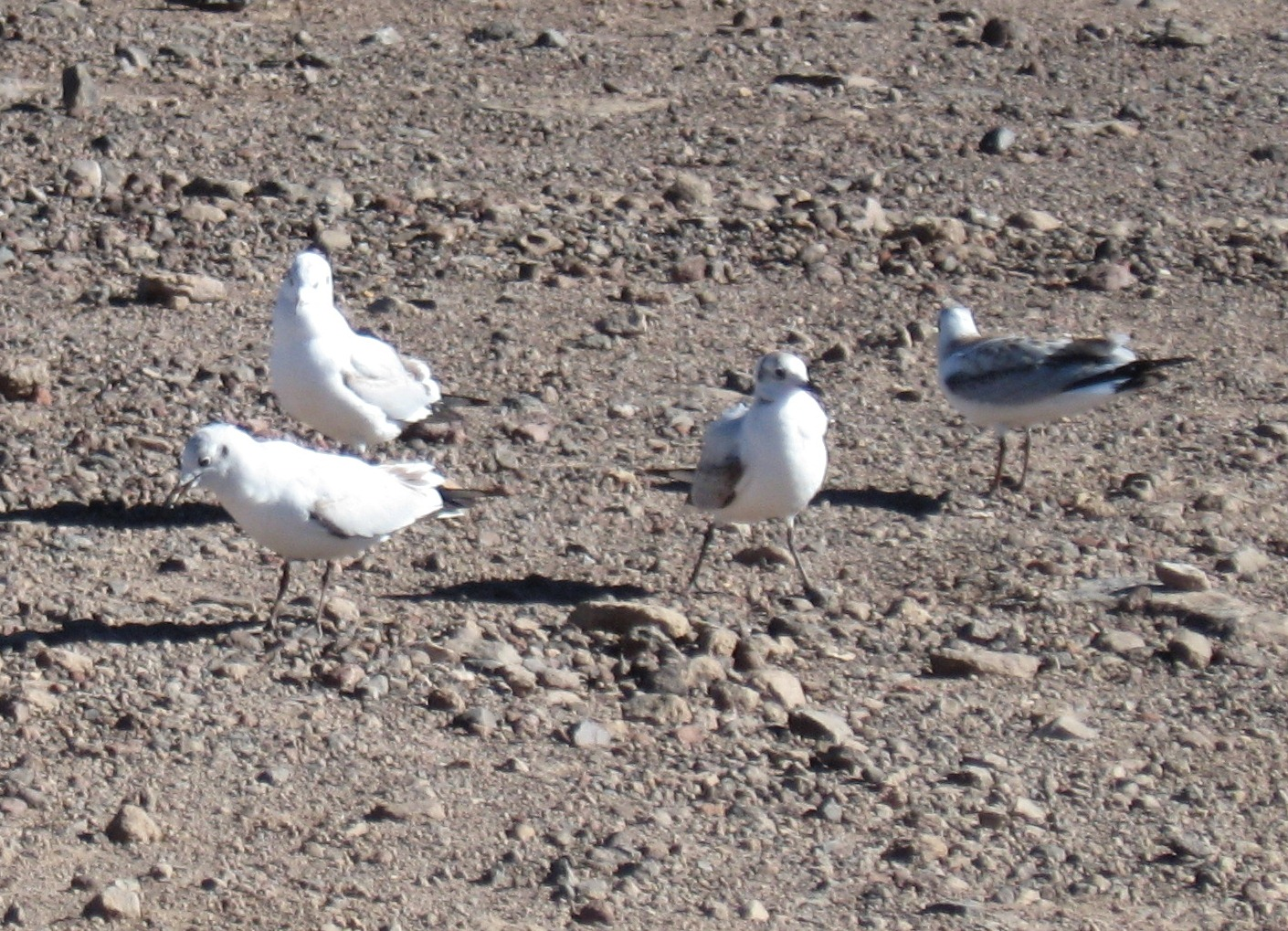
Gulls in southern Bolivia

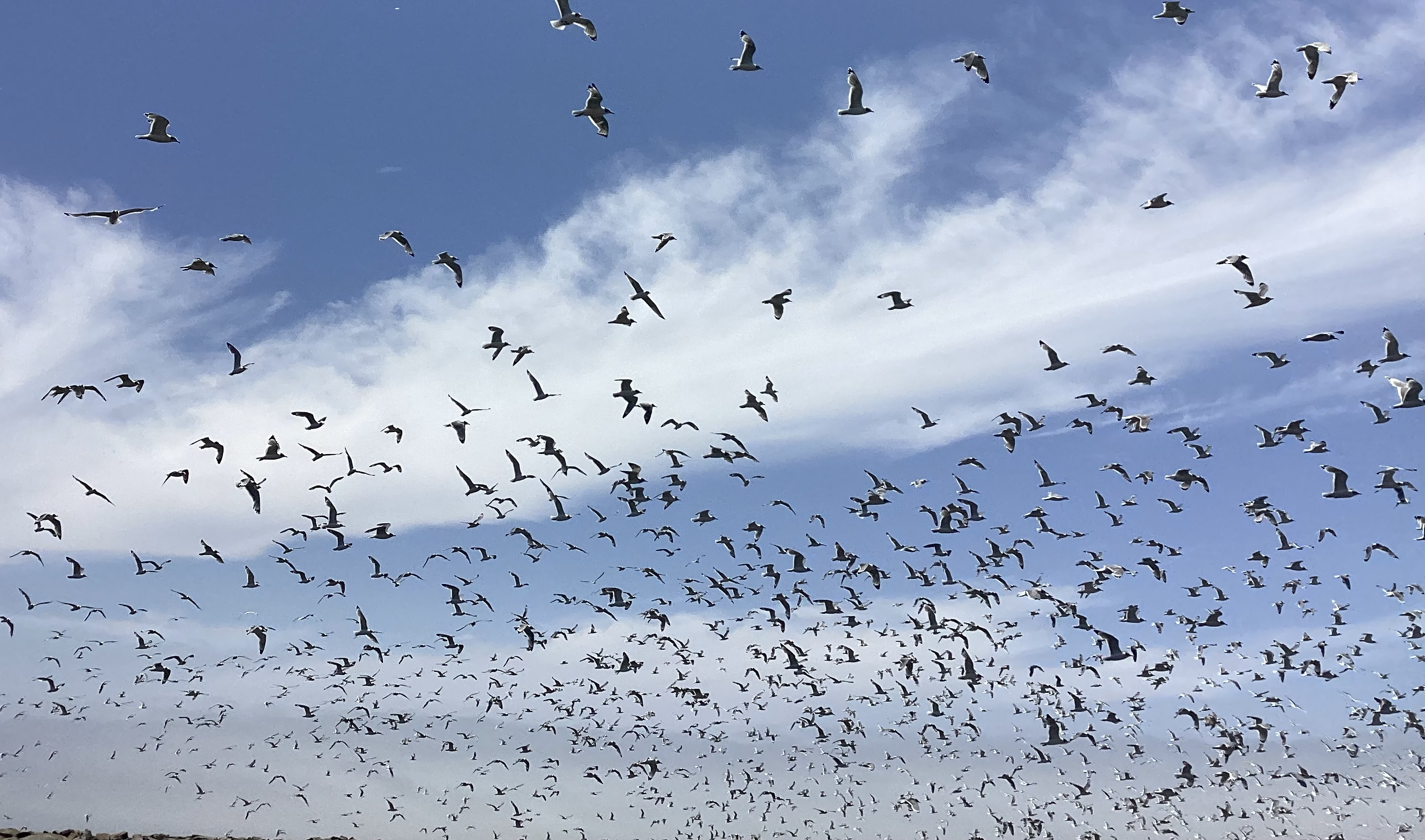
A large flock of Andean gulls in La Punta, Peru
