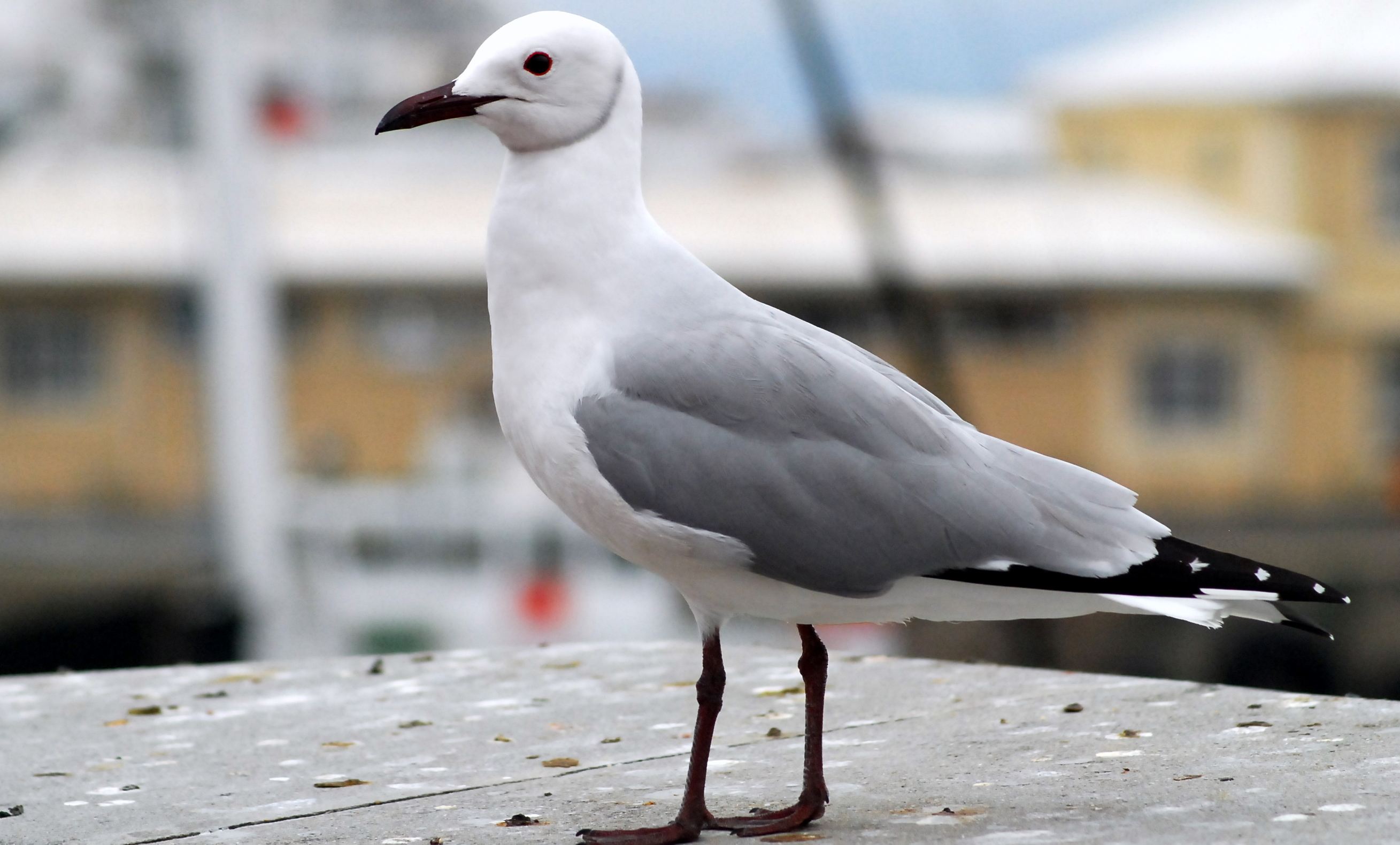
- Adult, Cape Town

Conservation status
- Least Concern (IUCN 3.1)

Scientific classification
- Kingdom: Animalia
- Phylum: Chordata
- Class: Aves
- Order: Charadriiformes
- Family: Laridae
- Genus: Chroicocephalus
- Species: C. hartlaubii

Binomial name
- Chroicocephalus hartlaubii (Bruch, 1855)

Synonyms
- Larus hartlaubii

= Hartlaub's gull =

Species of bird

Hartlaub's gull (Chroicocephalus hartlaubii) is a small gull in the genus Chroicocephalus. It was formerly (as with other related gulls) placed in the genus Larus until genetic research demonstrated that the old broad view of that genus was paraphyletic. In the past it had sometimes been treated as a subspecies of the Australasian silver gull (C. novaehollandiae), but is now treated as a separate species; current genetic evidence suggests its closest relative is not the silver gull but the African and South American grey-headed gull (C. cirrocephalus), and in particular the African subspecies of it C. c. poiocephalus (with the possibility that C. cirrocephalus is paraphyletic with respect to C. hartlaubii: Černý & Natale 2022, Fig. 6).

The species' name commemorates the German physician and zoologist, Gustav Hartlaub. In the past, it was also sometimes known as "king gull".

== Description ==
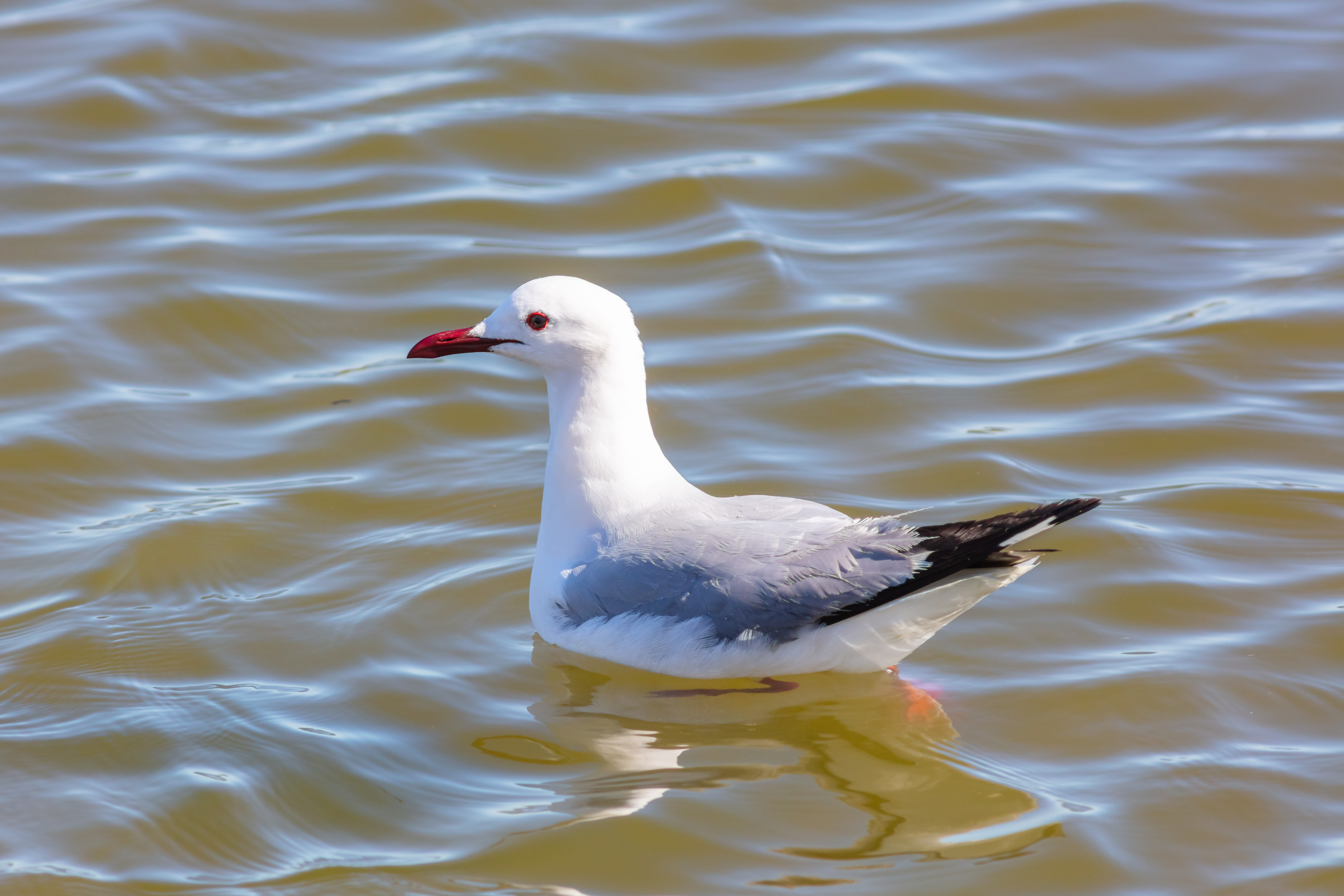
Walvis Bay, Namibia.

Hartlaub's gull is 37–39 cm in length, with a wingspan of 89–92 cm and a weight of 235–340 g. It is a mainly white gull with a grey back and upperwings, black wingtips with conspicuous white "mirrors", and a dark red bill and legs. When breeding it has a very faint lavender grey hood, but otherwise has a plain white head. The sexes are similar. This species differs from the slightly larger grey-headed gull in its thinner, darker bill, deeper red legs, paler, plainer head, and dark eyes. It takes two years to reach maturity. Juvenile birds have a brown band across the wings. They differ from same-age grey-headed gulls in that they lack a black terminal tail band, less dark areas in the wings, darker legs, and a white head.

== Distribution and habitat ==
The gull is a non-migratory breeding resident endemic to the Atlantic Ocean coastline of South Africa and Namibia. Although it is predominantly coastal or estuarine, it is not a pelagic species, and is rarely seen at sea far from land. About one half of the total population, currently estimated at 30,000 birds, lives within the Greater Cape Town area. It has accommodated well to humans, and can become very tame around habitations. Although it is a relatively rare species, about the tenth rarest of the world's 50 or so gull species, it is common in its range and is widely regarded in Cape Town as a nuisance, fouling buildings and bathing in urban ponds. It has, at times, been a hazard to aircraft near airports.

== Behaviour ==
Like most gulls, Hartlaub's is highly gregarious in winter, both when feeding or in evening roosts. This is a noisy species, especially at colonies. The call is a raucous crow-like kaaarrh. This species is frequently the subject of complaints about the noise it makes in urban areas.

=== Breeding ===
Hartlaub's gull breeds in large colonies, and the main traditional breeding colony for the Cape Town area is on Robben Island. The adults fly to the mainland to find food for their chicks, a round trip of about 24 km. Although most breed in large colonies on islands, some have started nesting on coastal buildings.

=== Feeding ===
The species is omnivorous like most Larus gulls, and they will scavenge at tips and feed on scraps as well as seeking suitable small prey, often by wading in shallow water.
