= David Steadman =

American ornithologist and paleontologist

David William Steadman is a paleontologist and ornithologist, and Curator Emeritus of ornithology at the Florida Museum of Natural History at the University of Florida.

His research has concentrated on the evolution, biogeography, conservation, and extinction of tropical birds, particularly in the islands of the Pacific Ocean. He has also authored over 180 scientific publications. Steadman trained at the University of Arizona as a student of Paul S. Martin, supported by a Predoctoral Fellowship from the Smithsonian Institution. He has conducted a number of digs at prehistoric sites and uncovered widescale extinctions caused by humans in the early stages of colonisation. He has conducted several expeditions to the Galápagos Islands, and has described a number of extinct species of birds and more recently was involved in discovering that the Solomon Islands frogmouth is a species (instead of a subspecies of the marbled frogmouth, as formerly believed). He worked extensively on Easter Island, carrying out the first systematic excavations of the island in order to identify the plants and animals that once lived there.

== Education ==
- Bachelor's degree in Biology from Edinboro State College in 1973.
- Master's degree in Zoology from the University of Florida in 1975.
- Doctorate in Geosciences from the University of Arizona in 1982.
