= Bree (surname) =

Bree or van Bree or Brée is a surname, and may refer to:

- Andrew Bree (born 1981), Irish swimmer
- Charles Robert Bree (1811–1886), British physician, ornithologist and zoologist
- Charles Van Bree (1894–1976), Belgian racing cyclist
- Declan Bree (born 1951), Irish politician
- Firmin van Bree (1880–1960), Belgian engineer
- Francisco González Bree (born 1968), Spanish executive, academic and writer
- Germaine Brée (1907–2001), French-American literary scholar
- Herbert Bree (1828–1899), Anglican bishop
- James Bree (actor) (1923–2008), British actor
- James Bree (footballer) (born 1997), English footballer
- Jonathan Bree (born 1979), singer-songwriter and producer in New Zealand
- Johannes Bernardus van Bree (1801–1857), Dutch composer and musician
- Luuk van Bree (born 1996), Dutch basketball player
- Mattheus Ignatius van Bree (1773–1839), Belgian painter, sculptor and architect
- Mien van Bree (1915–1983), Dutch cyclist
- Nico de Bree (1944–2016), Dutch football goalkeeper
- Peter Bree (born 1949), Dutch oboist and broadcaster
- Philippe-Jacques van Bree (1786–1871), Belgian architectural scholar and brother of Mattheus
- Robert Bree (1759–1839), English physician
- William Bree (1822–1917), Archdeacon of Coventry

== See also ==
- Brée
