= Charles Bree =

Charles Bree may refer to:

- Charles Robert Bree (1811–1886), British physician, ornithologist and zoologist
- Charles Van Bree (1894–1976), Belgian racing cyclist
