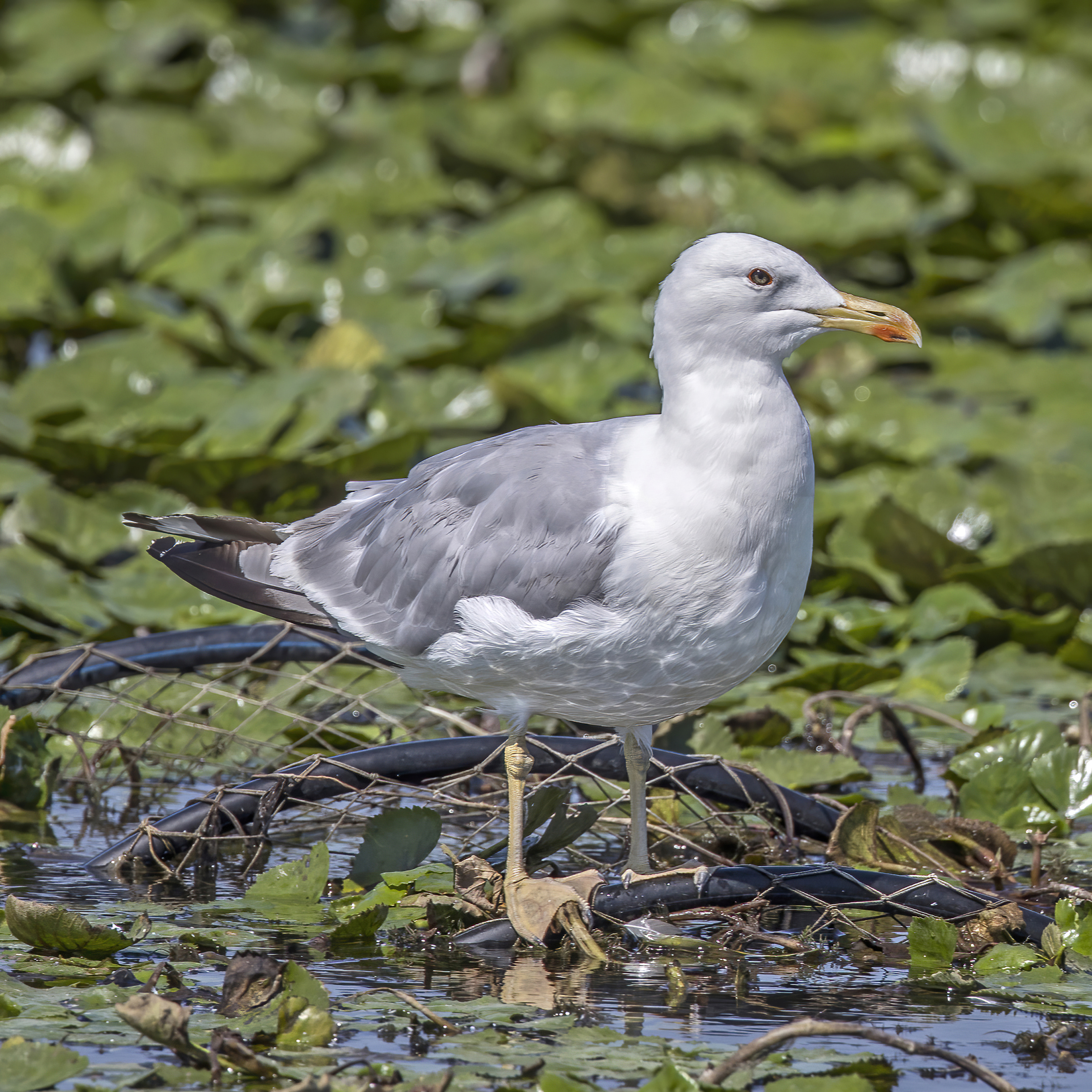
- Adult in summer plumage, Romania

Conservation status
- Least Concern (IUCN 3.1)

Scientific classification
- Kingdom: Animalia
- Phylum: Chordata
- Class: Aves
- Order: Charadriiformes
- Family: Laridae
- Genus: Larus
- Species: L. cachinnans

Binomial name
- Larus cachinnans Pallas, 1811
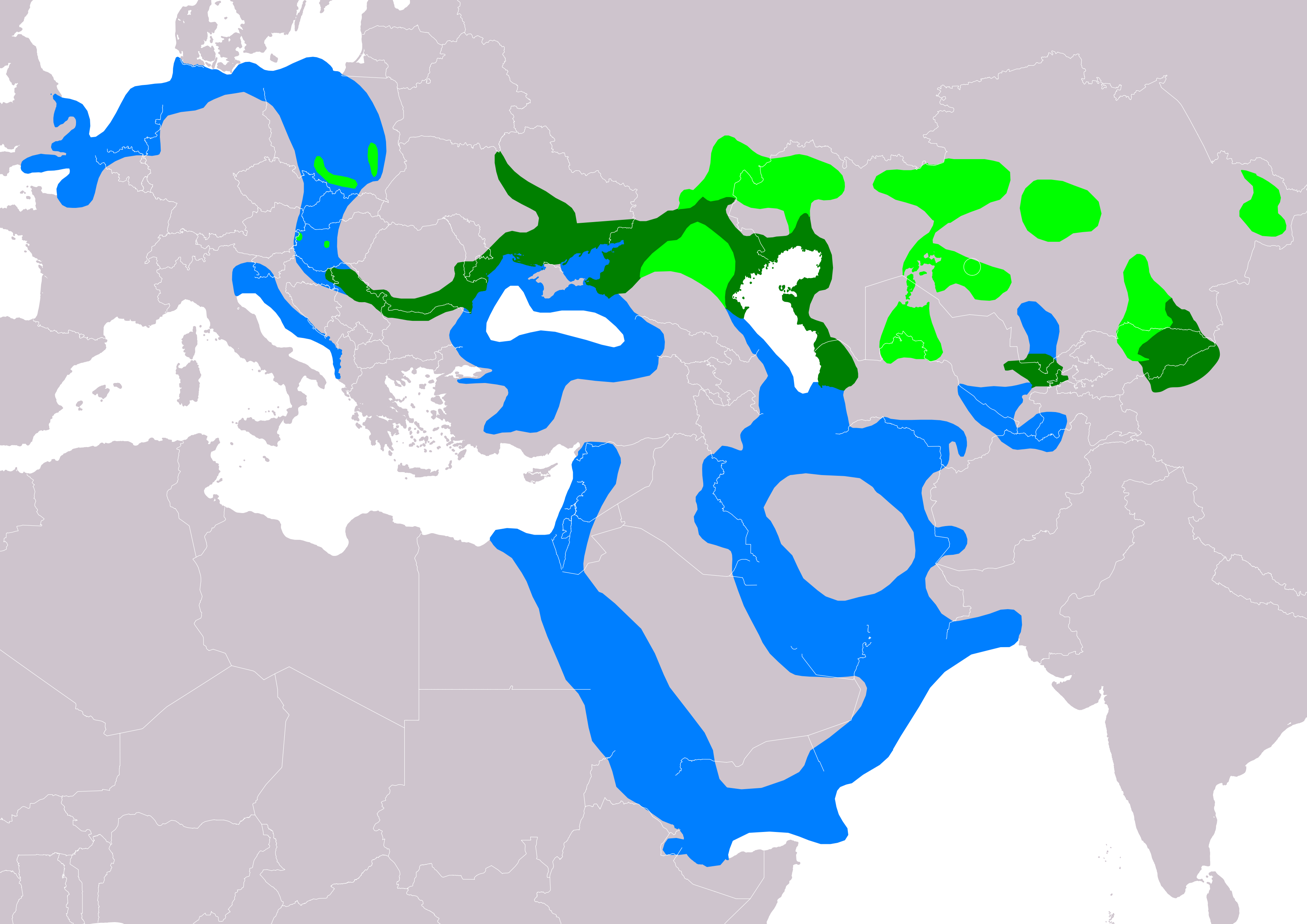
- Range of L. cachinnans Breeding Resident Non-breeding

= Caspian gull =

Species of bird

The Caspian gull (Larus cachinnans) is a large gull and a member of the herring and lesser black-backed gull complex. The scientific name is from Latin. Larus appears to have referred to a gull or other large seabird, and cachinnans means 'laughing', from cachinnare 'to laugh'.

== Description ==
It is a large gull at 56–68 cm (22–27 in) long, with a 137 to 155 cm (54 to 61 in) wingspan and a body mass of 680–1,590 g (1.50–3.51 lb). Among standard measurements, the wing chord is 38.5 to 48 cm (15.2 to 18.9 in), the bill is 4.6 to 6.4 cm (1.8 to 2.5 in) and the tarsus is 5.8 to 7.7 cm (2.3 to 3.0 in). The Caspian gull has a long, slender bill, accentuated by the sloping forehead. The legs, wings, and neck are longer than those of the herring gull and yellow-legged gull. The eye is small and often dark, and the legs vary from pale pink to a pale yellowish colour. The back and wings are a slightly darker shade of grey than the herring gull, but slightly paler than the yellow-legged gull. The outermost primary feather has a large white tip and a white tongue running up the inner web.

First-winter birds have a pale head with dark streaking on the back of the neck. The underparts are pale and the back is greyish. The greater and median wing coverts have whitish tips forming two pale lines across the wing.

== Distribution ==
The Caspian gull breeds around the Black and Caspian Seas, extending eastwards across Central Asia to north-west China. In Europe, it has been spreading north and west and now breeds in Poland, eastern Germany, southern Russia and all year round in Ukraine. Some birds migrate south as far as the Red Sea and Persian Gulf, while others disperse into Western Europe, in countries such as Sweden, Norway and Denmark or the Benelux and even North of France. Small numbers are now seen regularly in Britain, especially in South-east England, East Anglia, and the Midlands.

== Breeding ==
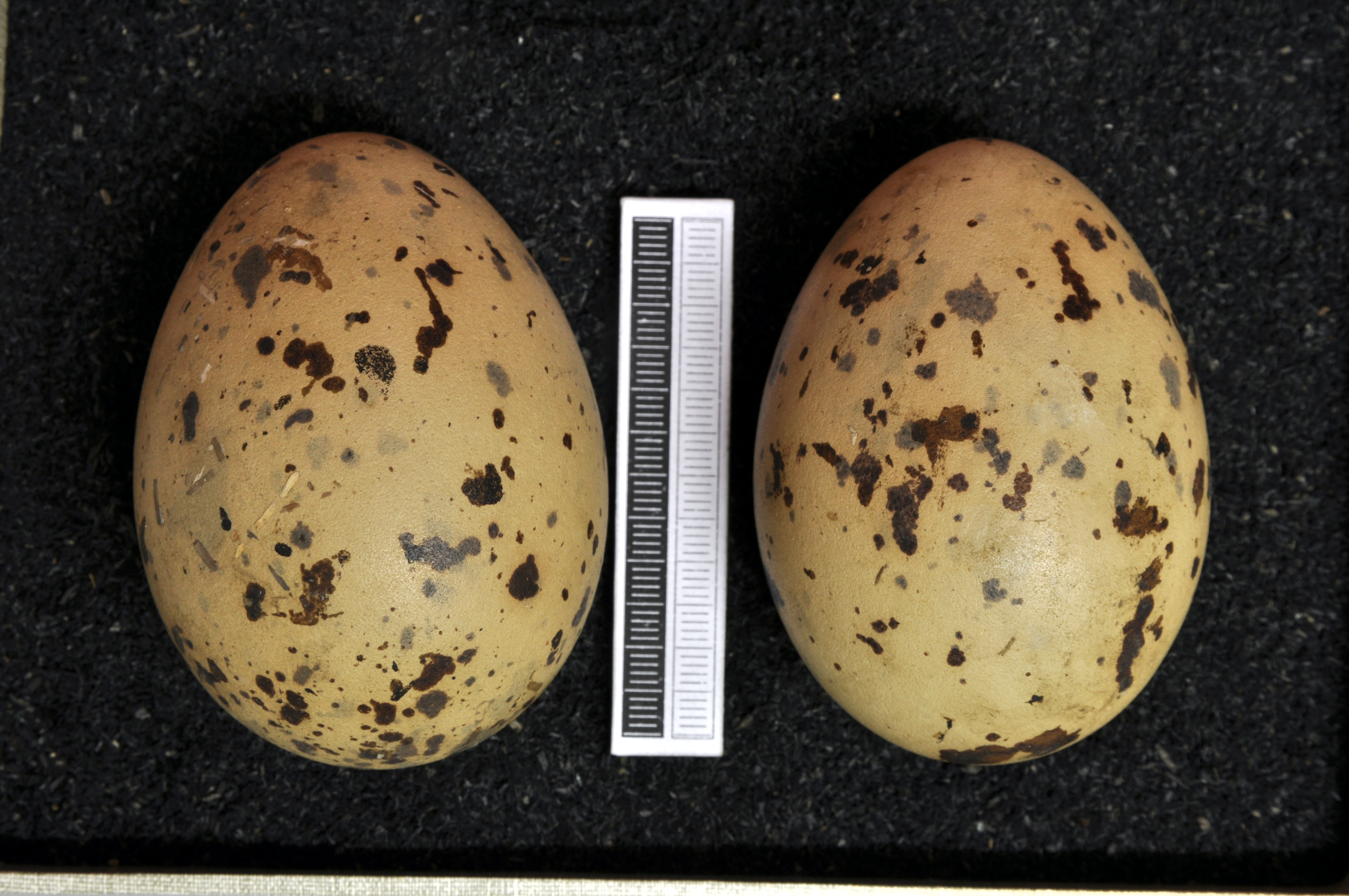
Eggs, collection Museum Wiesbaden

It typically nests on flat, low-lying ground by water, unlike the yellow-legged gull, which mainly nests on cliffs in areas where the two overlap. The breeding season starts from early April. Two or three eggs are laid and incubated for 27 to 31 days.

== Feeding ==
They are scavengers and predators with a very varied diet. During the breeding season, they often eat rodents such as ground squirrels, flying some distance into the steppes to find them.

== Classification and subspecies ==
This form has a troubled taxonomic history, summarised in the herring gull article. The Caspian gull used to be treated as a subspecies of the herring gull, but it is now treated as a full species by many authorities (e.g. the British Ornithologists' Union records committee). Some authorities include the yellow-legged gull (L. michahellis) within L. cachinnans, but it is also now commonly considered to be a separate species.

The steppe gull or Baraba gull (L. (cachinnans) barabensis) may be regarded as a subspecies of the Caspian gull or as a separate species. It is also very similar genetically to its northern neighbour, the taimyrensis race of Heuglin's gull. The steppe gull breeds in Central Asia, particularly northern Kazakhstan. Its nonbreeding range is still little-known, but most are thought to winter in southwestern Asia from the Persian Gulf to northwestern India. There are possible records of this form from Hong Kong and South Korea.

The Mongolian gull (L. (vegae/cachinnans) mongolicus) may be classed as a subspecies of the Caspian gull, a subspecies of the Vega gull, or as a species in its own right. It breeds in Mongolia and the surrounding areas and migrates southeast in winter.

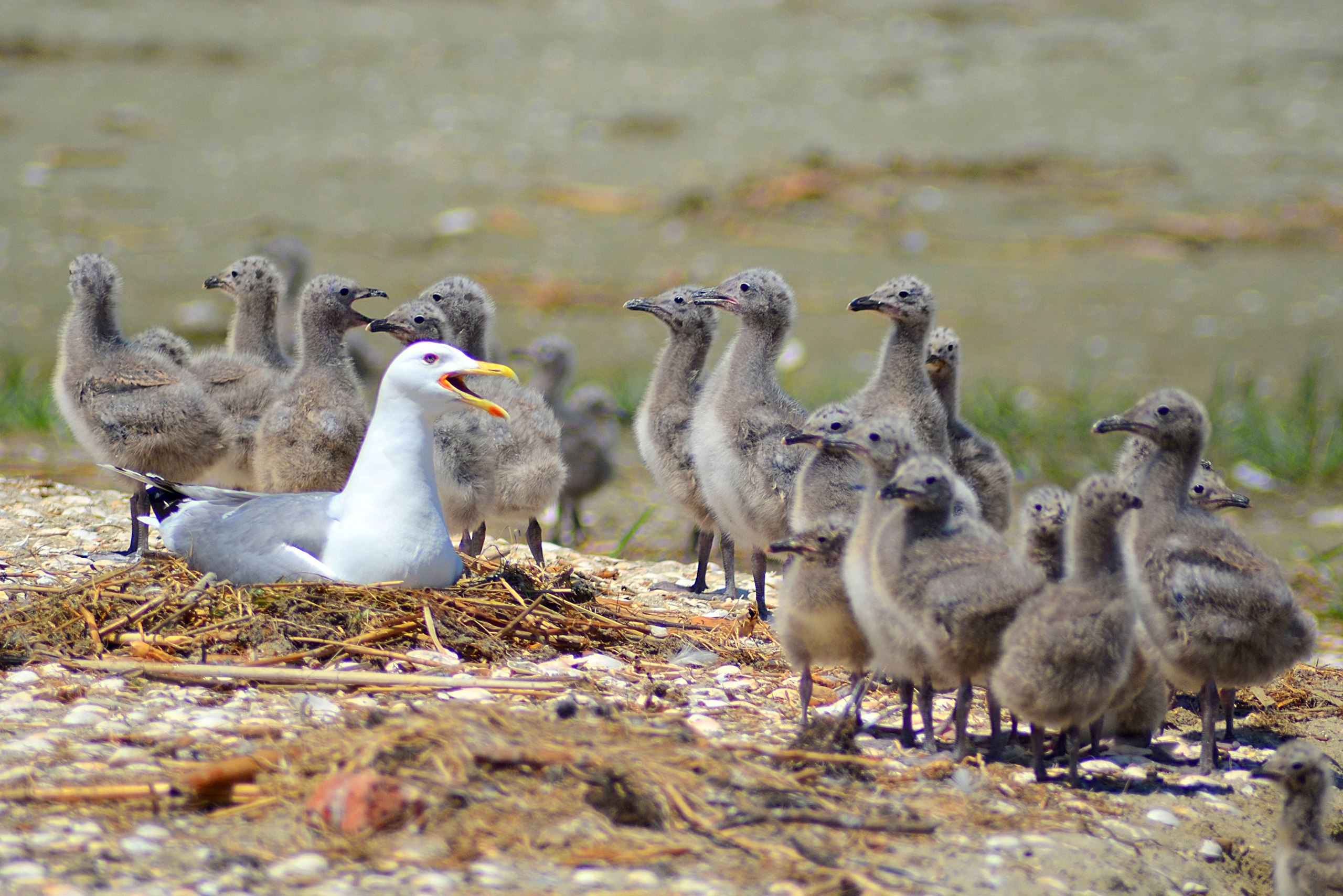
In Danube Biosphere Reserve

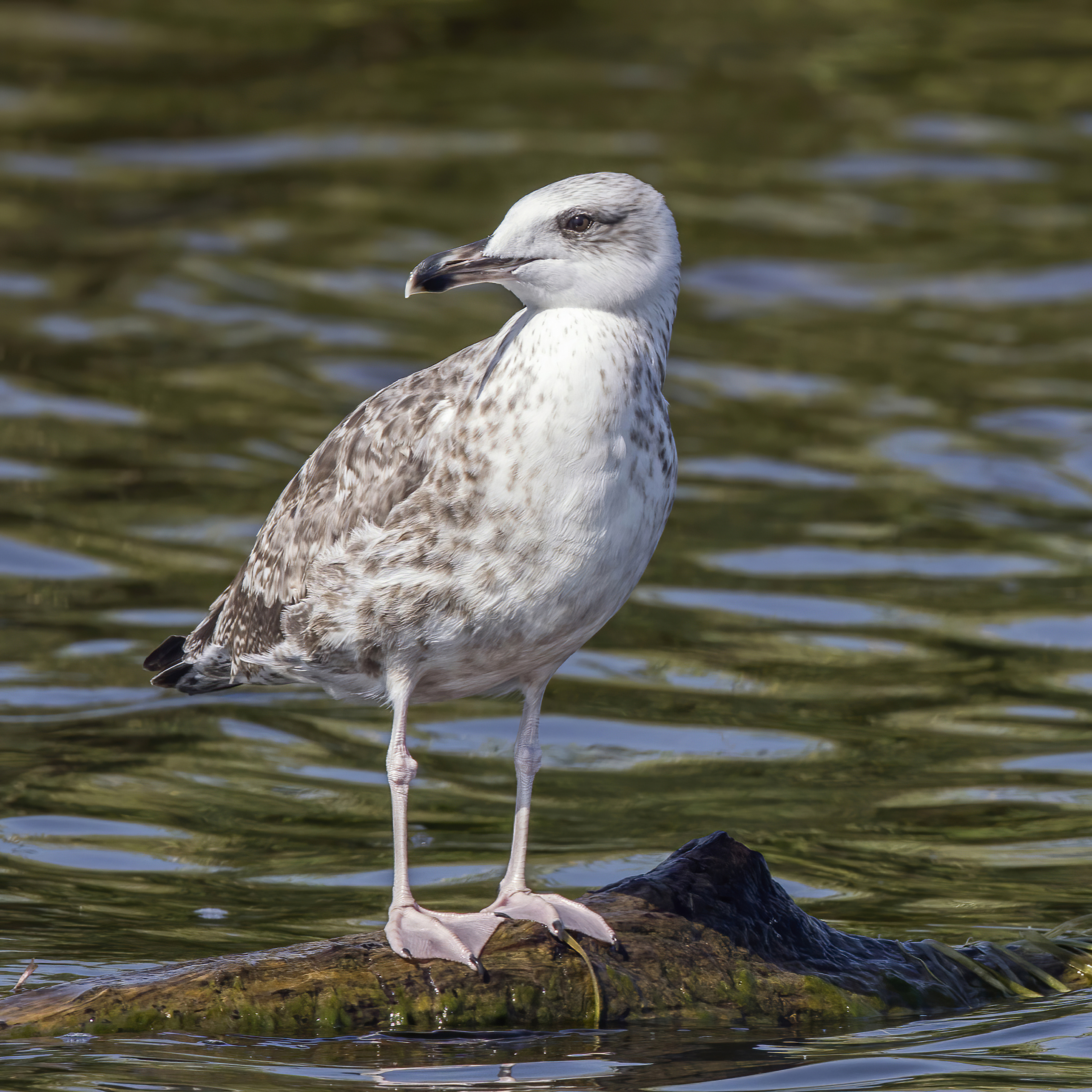
juvenile

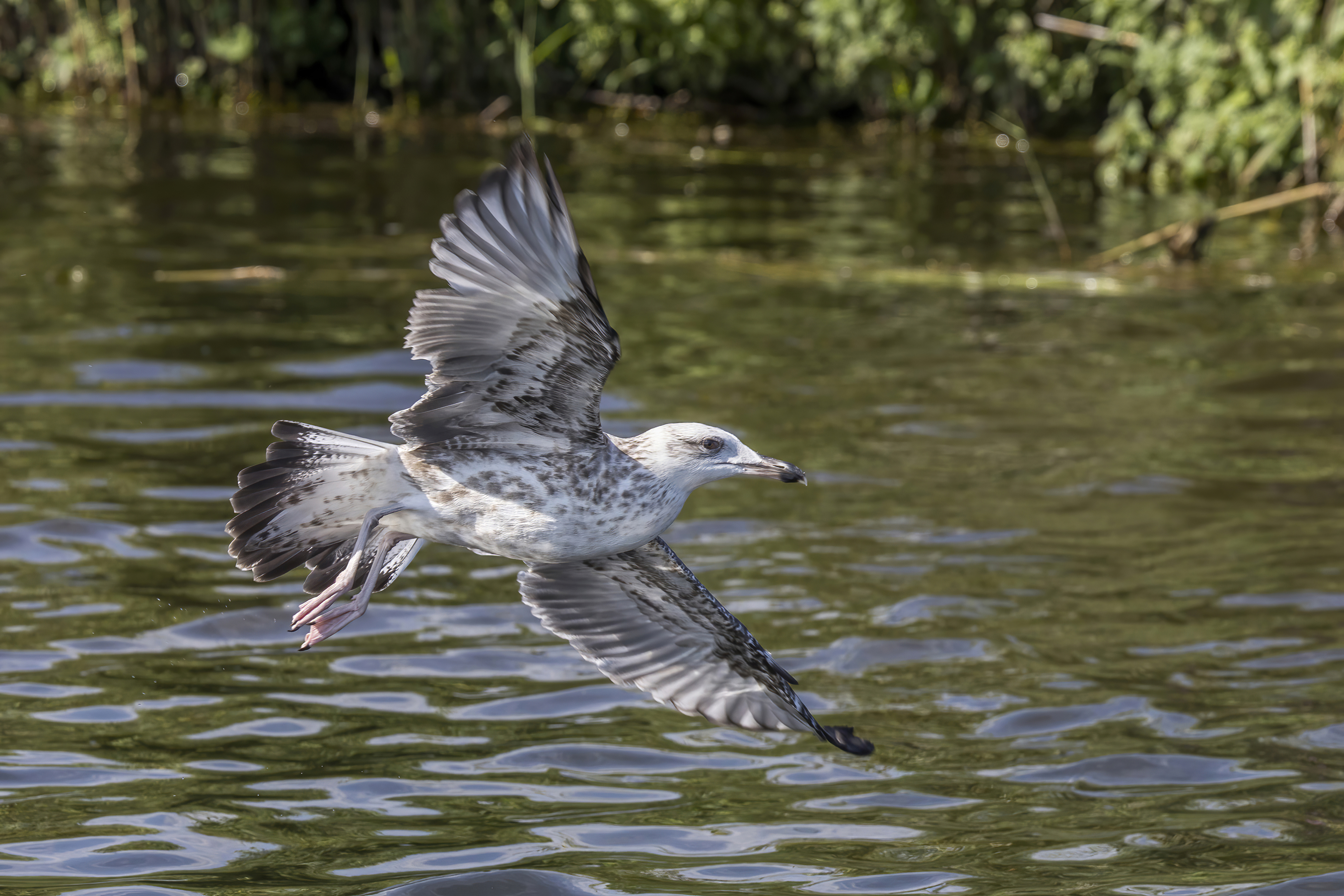
juvenile in flight

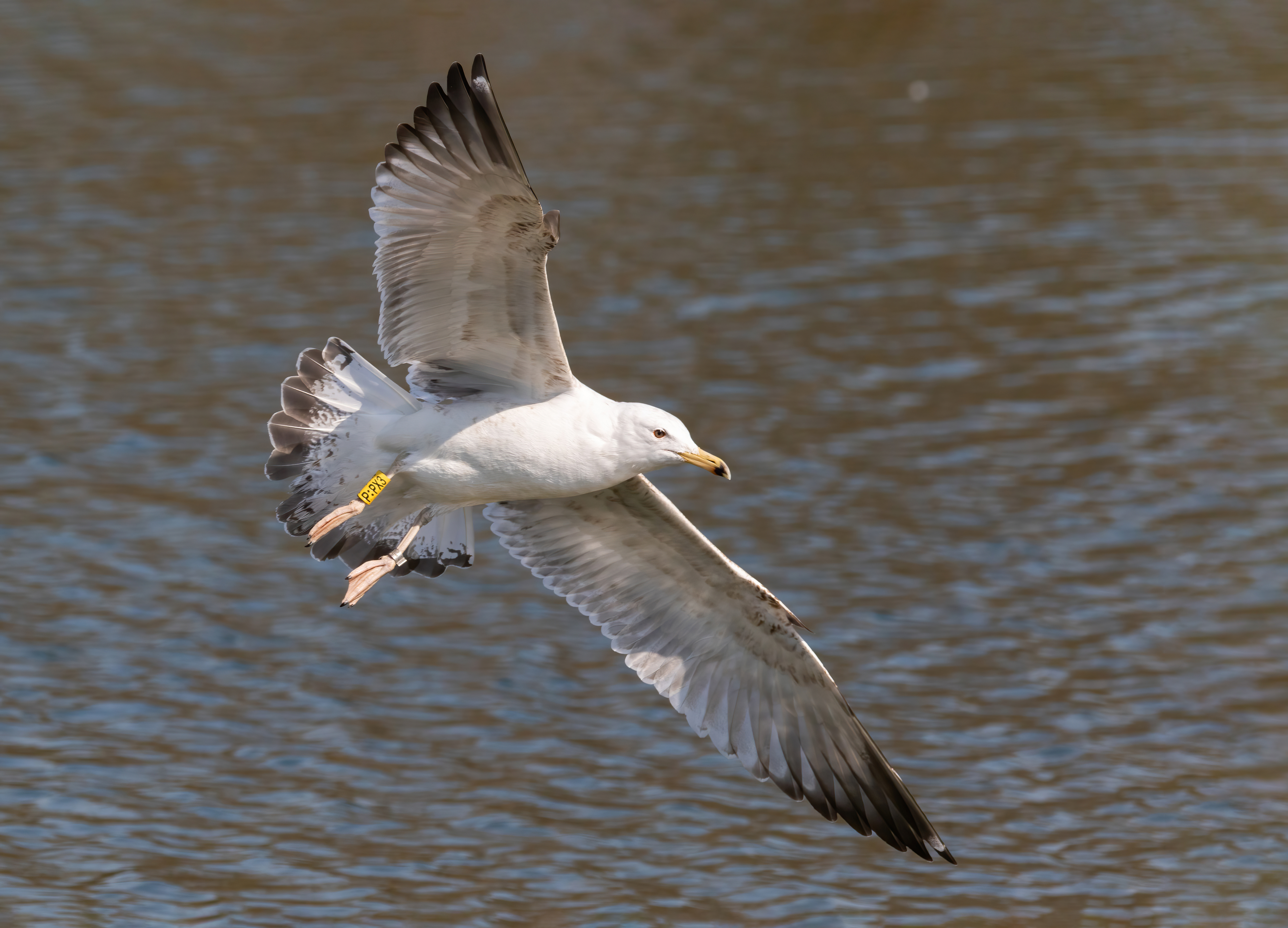
immature in flight
