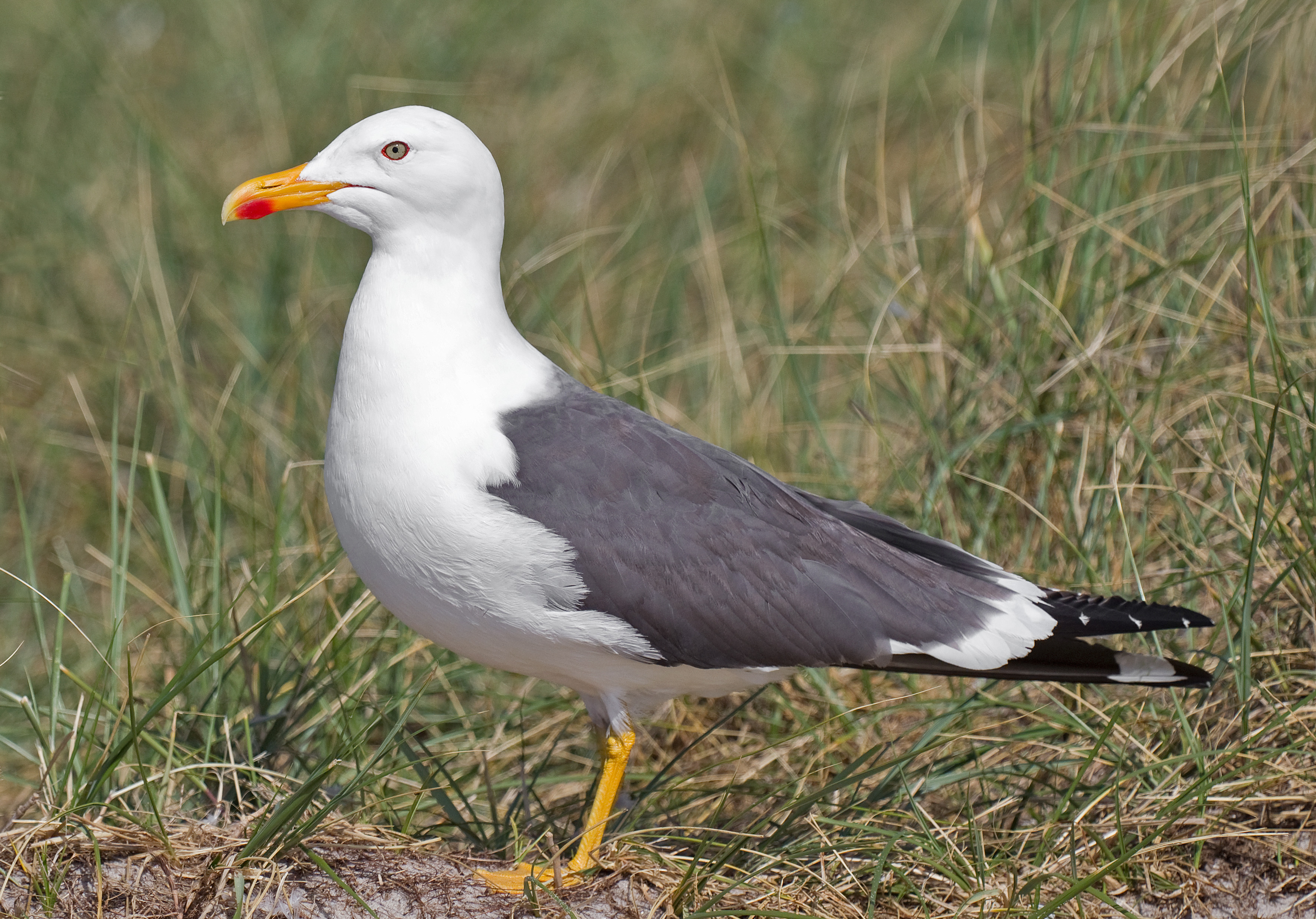
- Larus fuscus graellsii

Conservation status
- Least Concern (IUCN 3.1)

Scientific classification
- Kingdom: Animalia
- Phylum: Chordata
- Class: Aves
- Order: Charadriiformes
- Family: Laridae
- Genus: Larus
- Species: L. fuscus

Binomial name
- Larus fuscus Linnaeus, 1758

= Lesser black-backed gull =

Species of bird

The lesser black-backed gull (Larus fuscus) is a large gull that breeds on the Atlantic and Arctic coasts of Europe. It is migratory, wintering from the British Isles south to West Africa. However, it has increased dramatically in North America, especially along the east coast. Formerly just a winter visitor to North America, it now occurs in large numbers some winters and birds are recorded year-round. However, there is serious concern about decline in many parts of its range. The species is on the UK Amber List because the UK is home to 40 per cent of the European population and more than half of these are found at fewer than ten breeding sites.

== Taxonomy ==
The lesser black-backed gull was one of the many species originally described by Carl Linnaeus in his 1758 10th edition of Systema Naturae, and it still bears its original name Larus fuscus. The scientific name is from Latin. Larus appears to have referred to a gull or other large seabird, and fuscus meant black or brown.

=== Subspecies ===
Five subspecies are accepted:

Image	Subspecies	Distribution
	L. f. graellsii Brehm, 1857	Greenland, Iceland, Faroe Islands, British Isles, western Europe – mantle dark grey
	L. f. intermedius Schiøler, 1922	Netherlands, Germany, Denmark, southwest Sweden and western Norway – mantle sooty black
	L. f. fuscus Linnaeus, 1758	northern Norway, Sweden and Finland to the White Sea – mantle jet black
	L. f. heuglini Bree, 1876	northern Russia to north-central Siberia; known as Heuglin's gull, this was previously considered a separate species.
	L. f. barabensis Johansen, 1960	central Asia

== Description ==
The lesser black-backed gull is smaller than the European herring gull. The taxonomy of the herring gull / lesser black-backed gull complex is complicated; different authorities recognise between two and eight species. This group has a ring species distribution around the Northern Hemisphere. Differences between adjacent forms in this ring are fairly small, but by the time the circuit is completed, the end members, herring gull and lesser black-backed gull, are clearly different species.

The lesser black-backed gull measures 51–64 cm (20–25 in), 124–150 cm (49–59 in) across the wings, and weighs 452–1,100 g (0.996–2.425 lb), with the nominate race averaging slightly smaller than the other two subspecies. Males, at an average weight of 824 g (1.817 lb), are slightly larger than females, at an average of 708 g (1.561 lb). The wing chord is 38 to 45 cm (15 to 18 in), the bill is 4.2 to 5.8 cm (1.7 to 2.3 in), and the tarsus is 5.2 to 6.9 cm (2.0 to 2.7 in). A confusable species is the great black-backed gull. The lesser is a much smaller bird, with slimmer build, yellow rather than pinkish legs, and smaller white "mirrors" at the wing tips. The adults have black or dark grey wings (depending on race) and back. The bill is yellow with a red spot at which the young peck, inducing feeding (see fixed action pattern). The head is greyer in winter, unlike that of the great black-backed gull. The annual moult for adults begins between May and August and is not complete on some birds until November. A partial prebreeding moult occurs between January and April.

Young birds have scaly black-brown upperparts and a neat wing pattern. They take four years to reach maturity. Identification from juvenile herring gulls is most readily done by the more solidly dark (unbarred) tertial feathers.

Their call is a "laughing" cry like that of the herring gull, but with a markedly deeper pitch.

== Distribution ==
Lesser black-backed gulls have expanded their range westwards, first colonising Greenland in the 1980s. The species has not yet bred in an intraspecific pair in the United States; however, hybrid pairs with American herring gulls, one of which produced offspring, have been recorded twice.

== Breeding ==
This species breeds colonially on coasts and lakes, making a lined nest on the ground or a cliff. Normally, three eggs are laid. In some cities, the species nests within the urban environment, often in association with herring gulls.

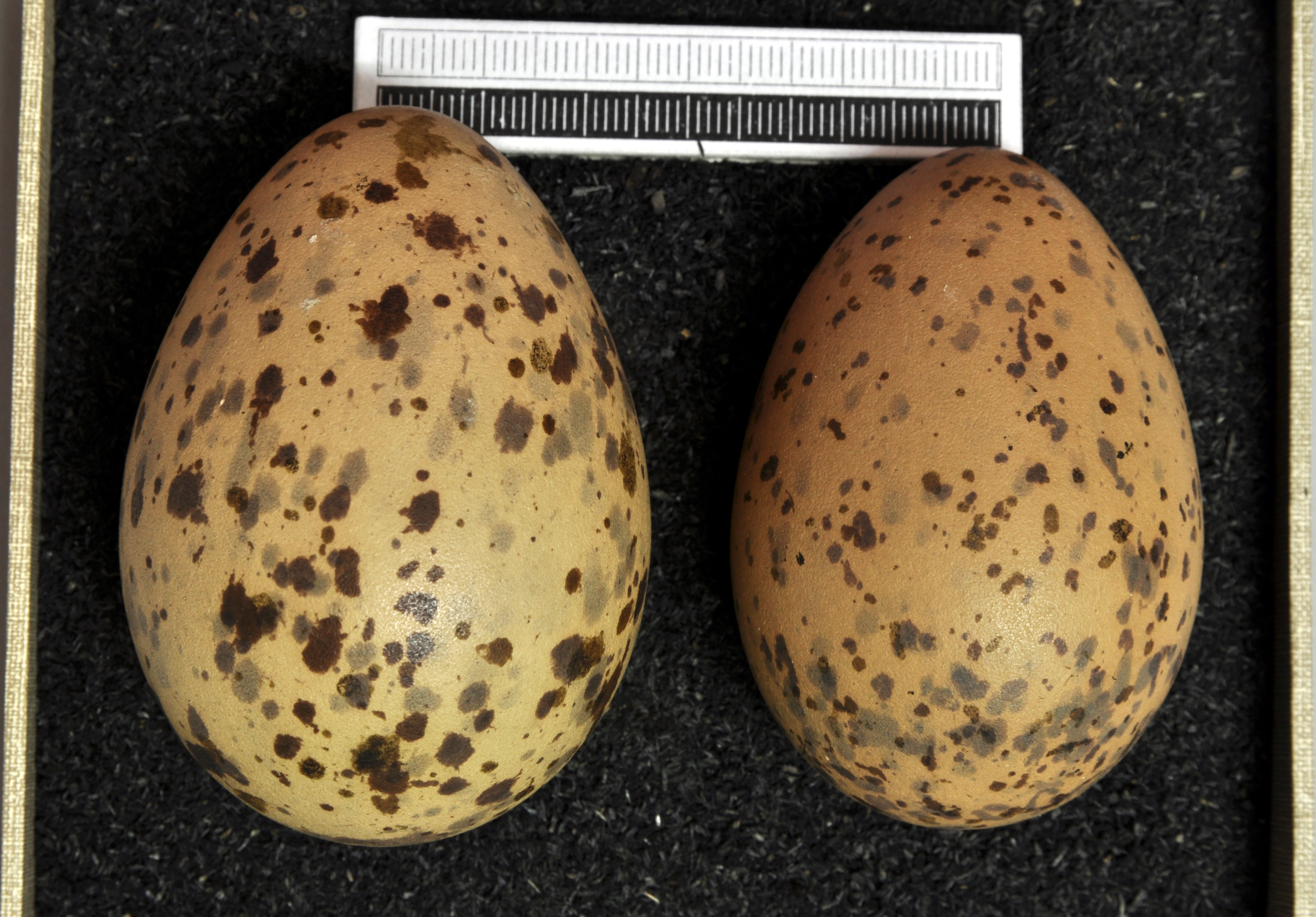
Eggs, collection Museum Wiesbaden

== Feeding ==
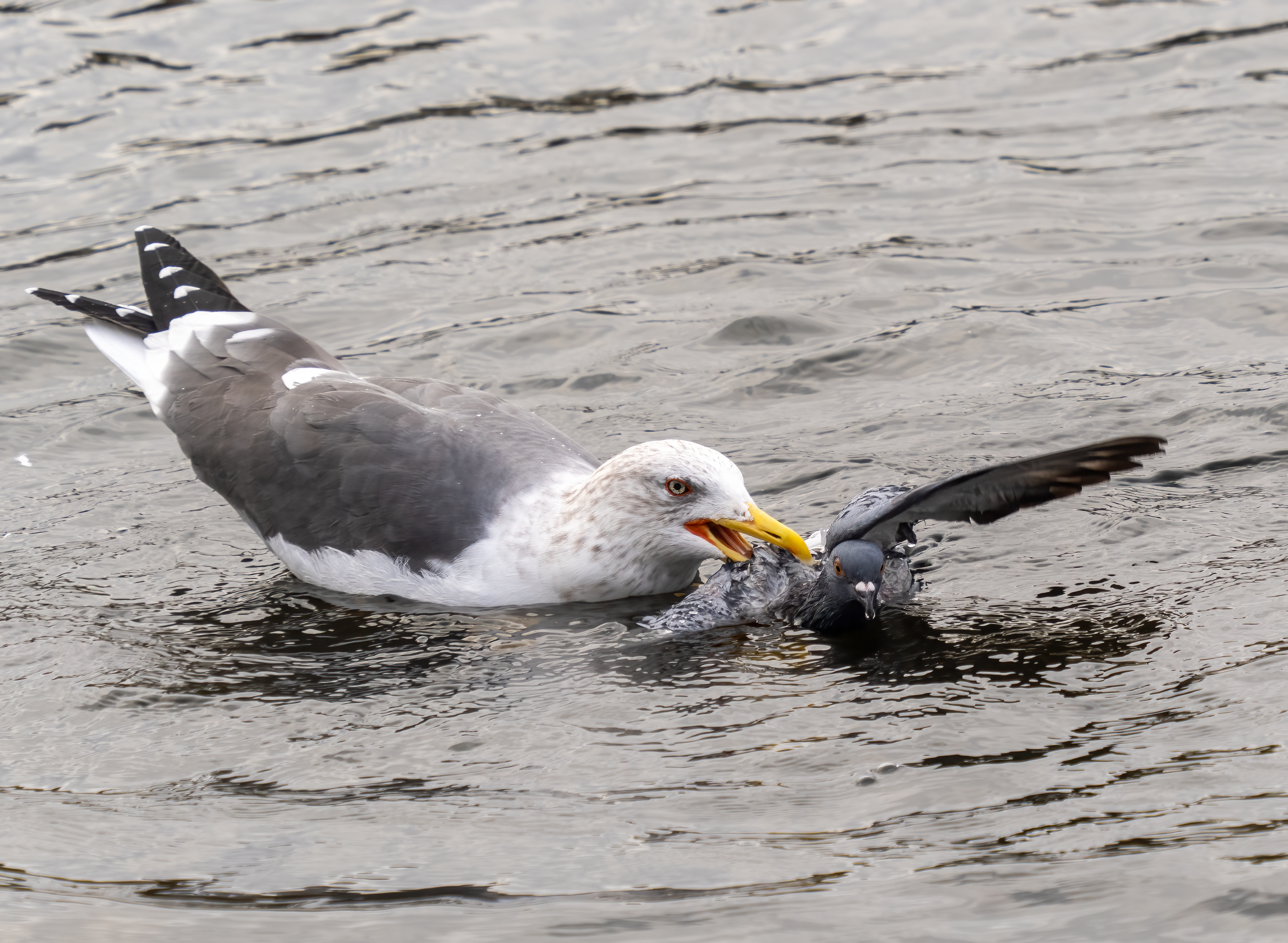
Lesser black-backed gull preying upon a feral pigeon

They are omnivores, like most Larus gulls, and eat fish, insects, crustaceans, worms, starfish, molluscs, seeds, berries, small mammals, eggs, small birds, chicks, scraps, offal, and carrion.

== Gallery ==
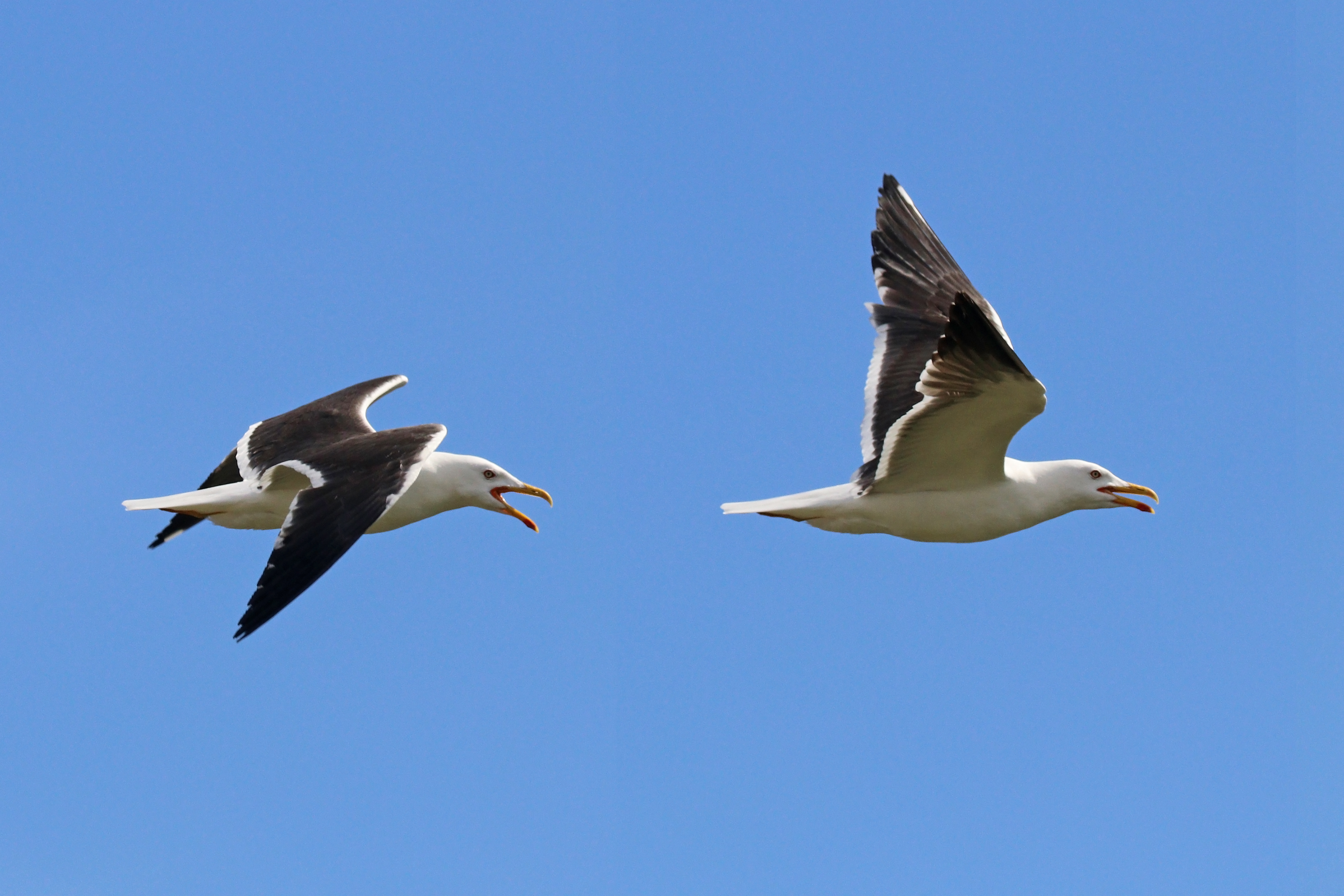
L. f. intermedius in flight, Sweden

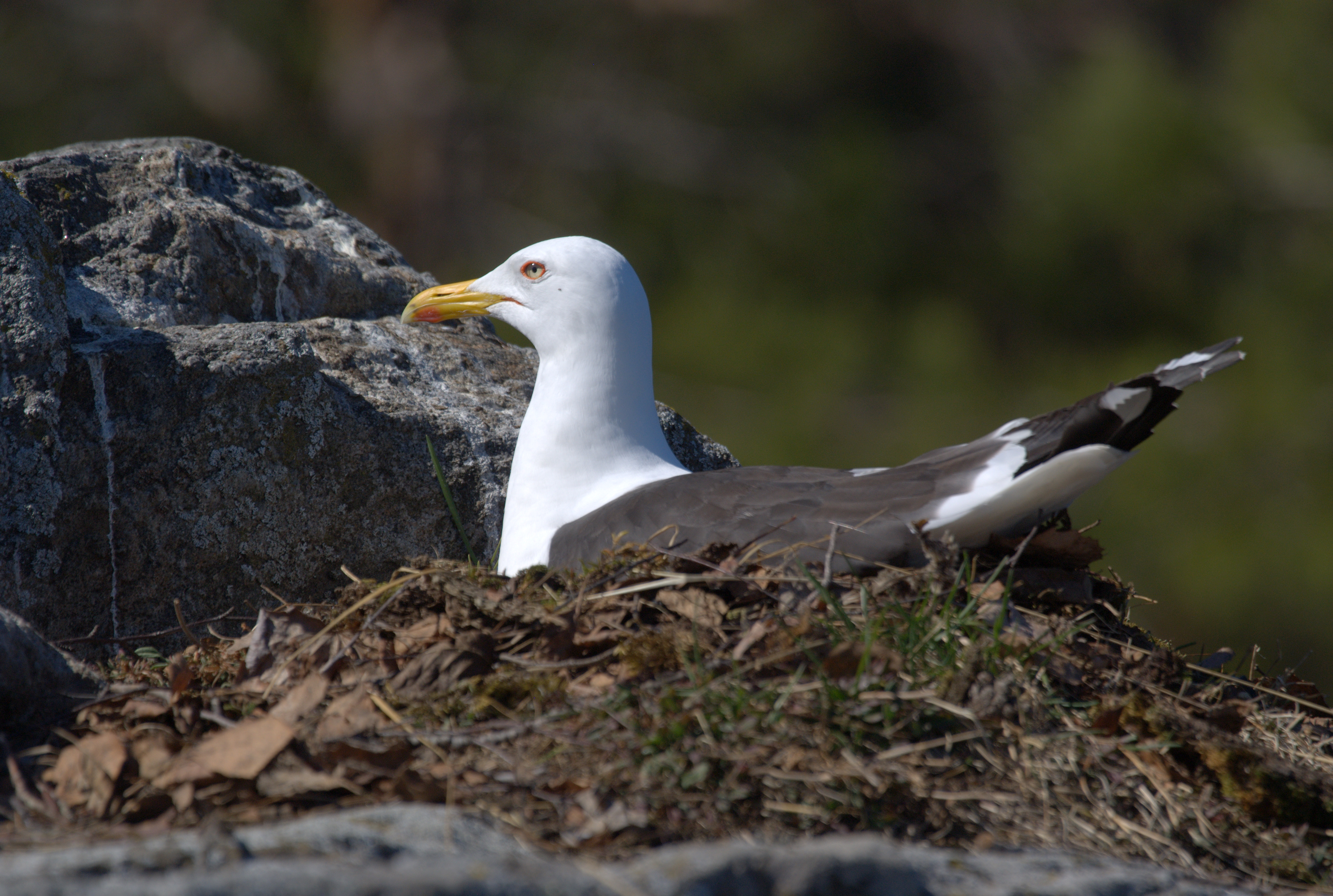
Gull incubating eggs in Pälkäne, Finland

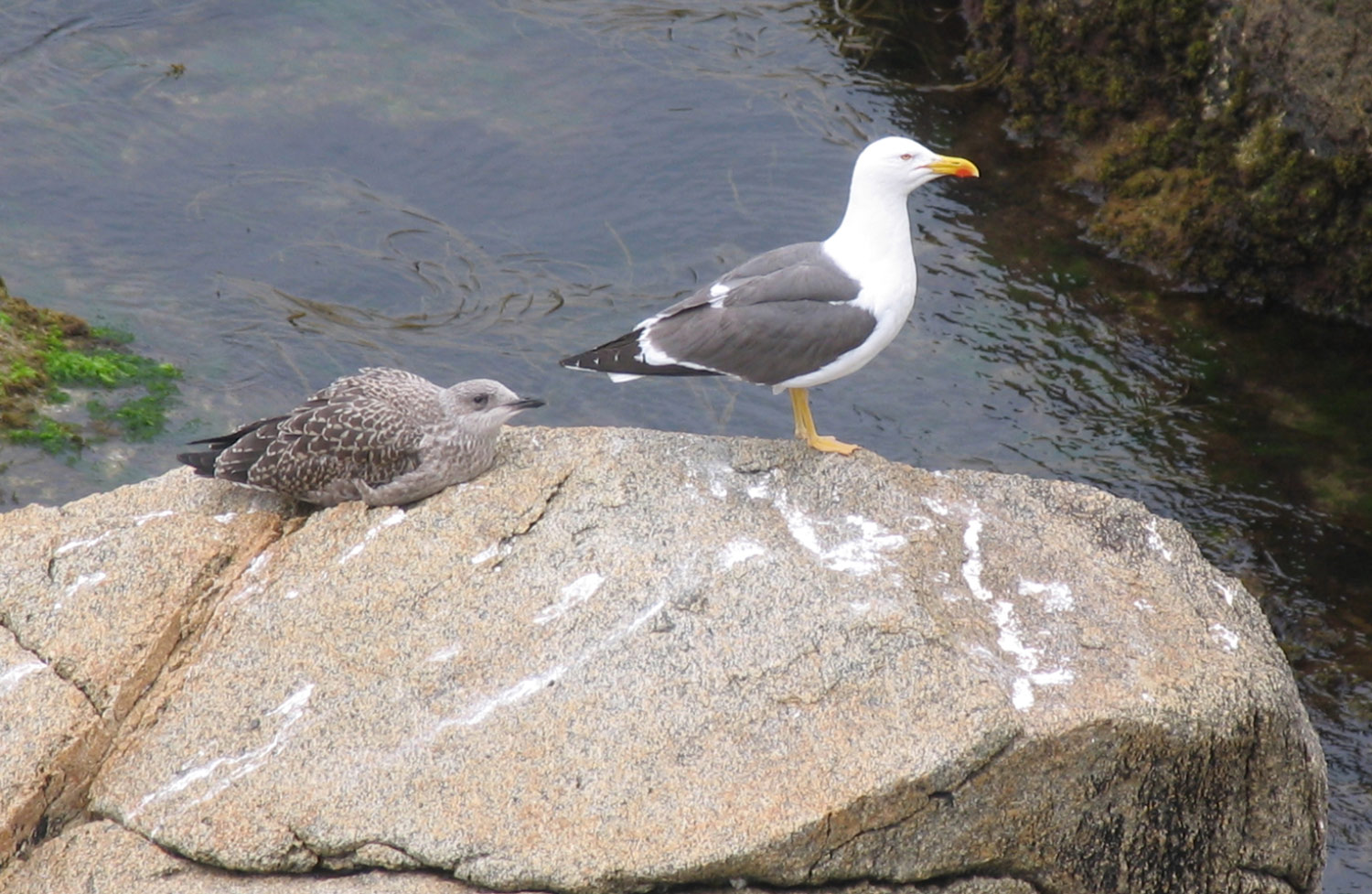
Mother gull and her baby

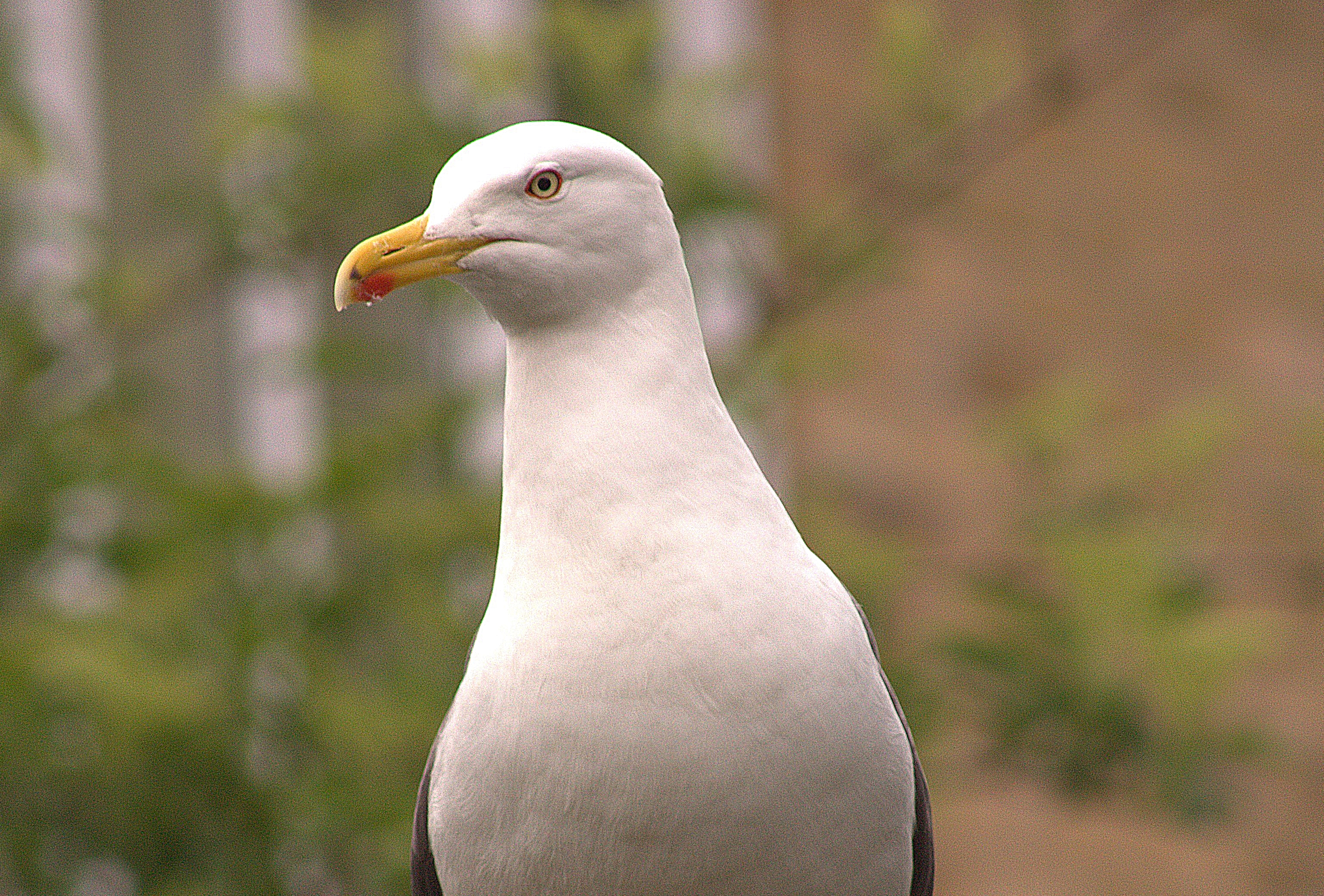
Close up

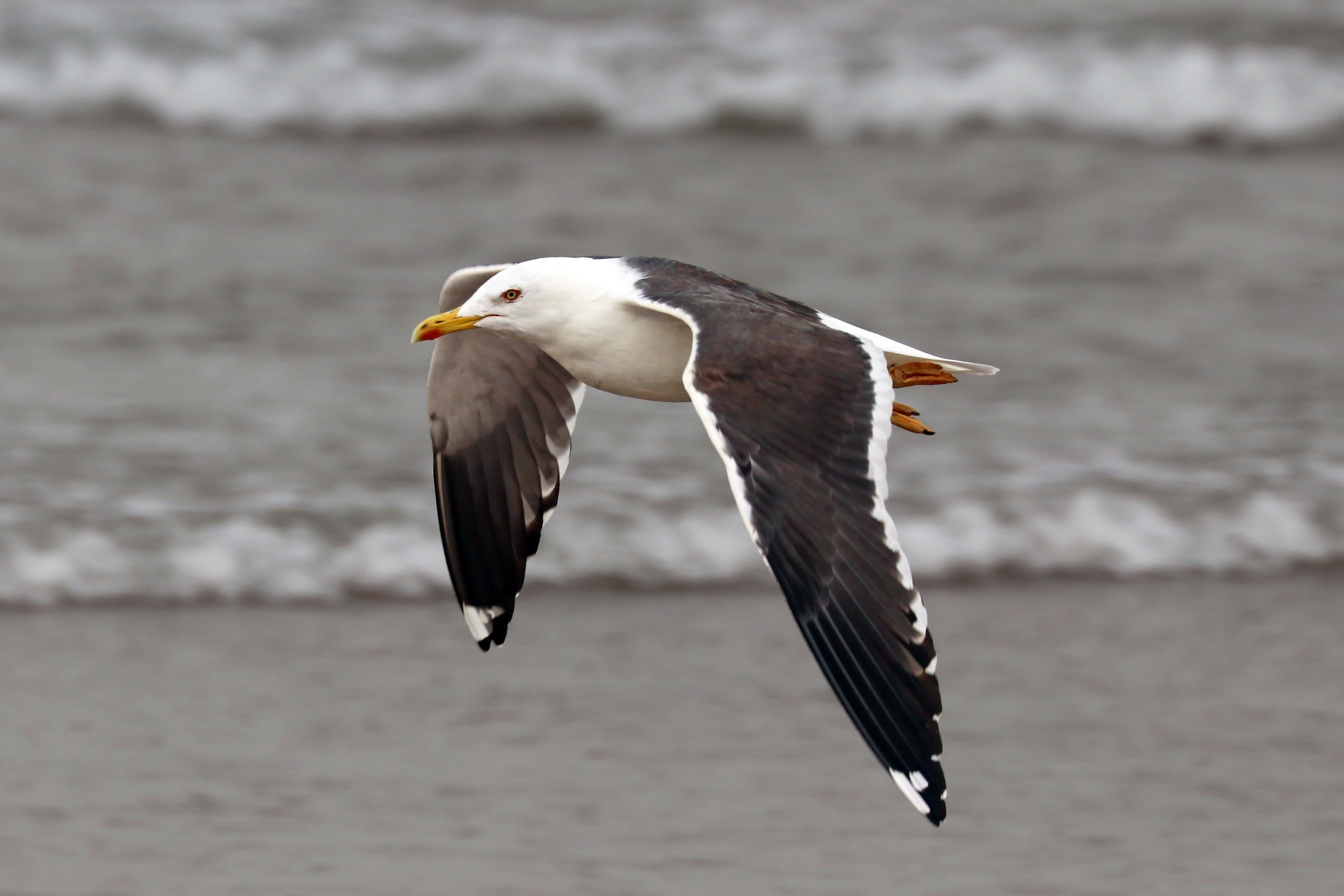
L. f. graellsii adult, Morocco

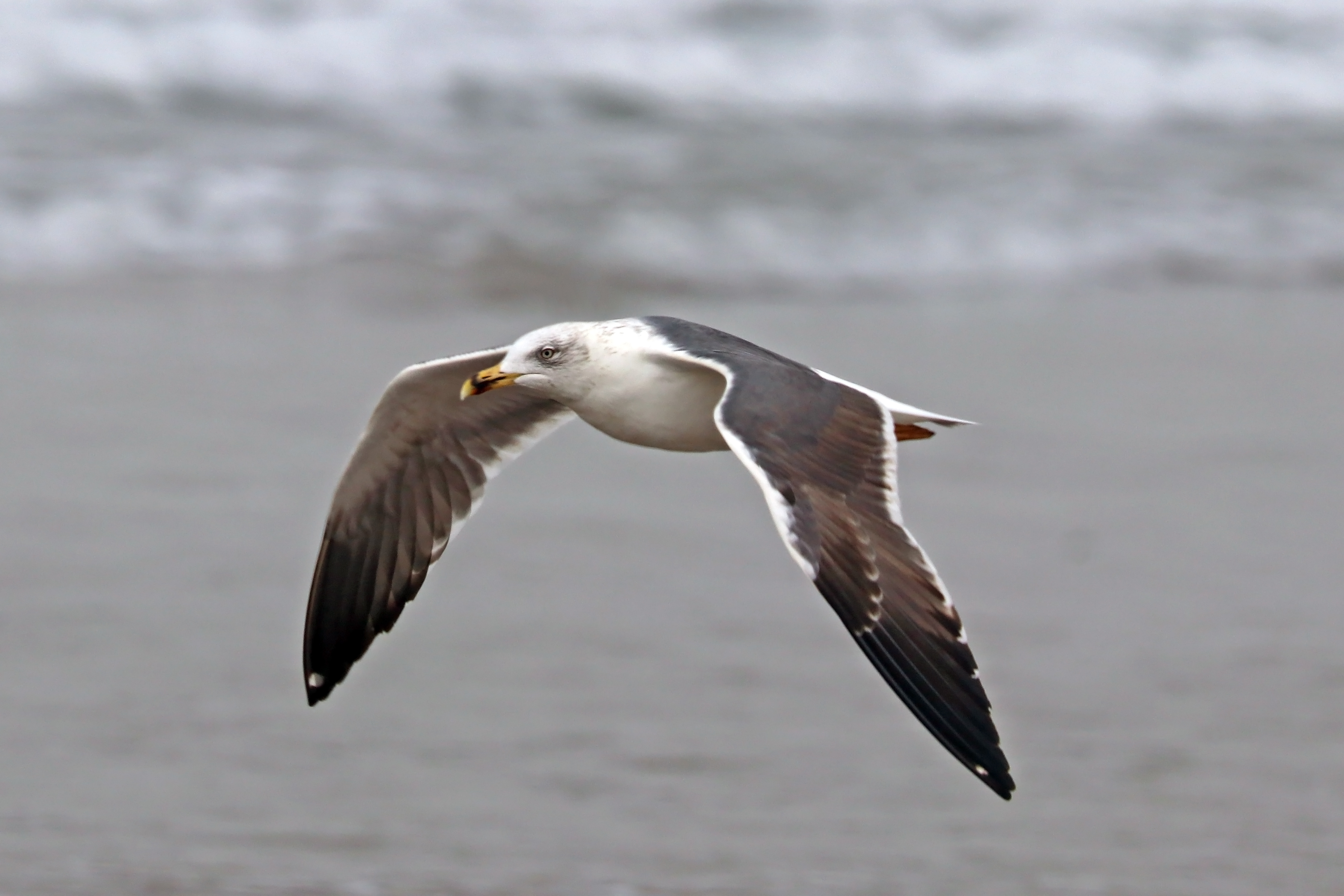
L. f. graellsii young adult, Morocco

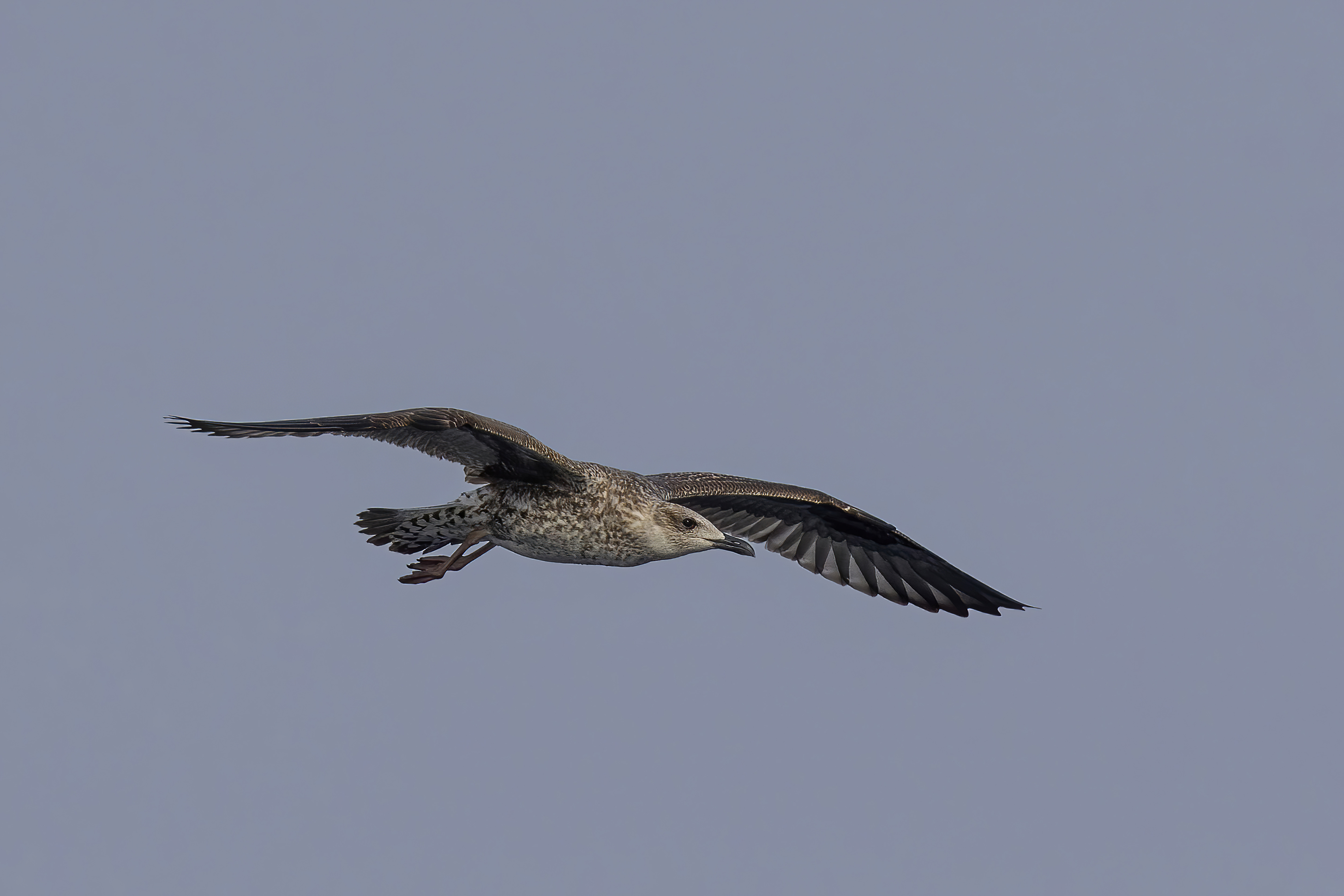
L. f. graellsii juvenile, Portugal

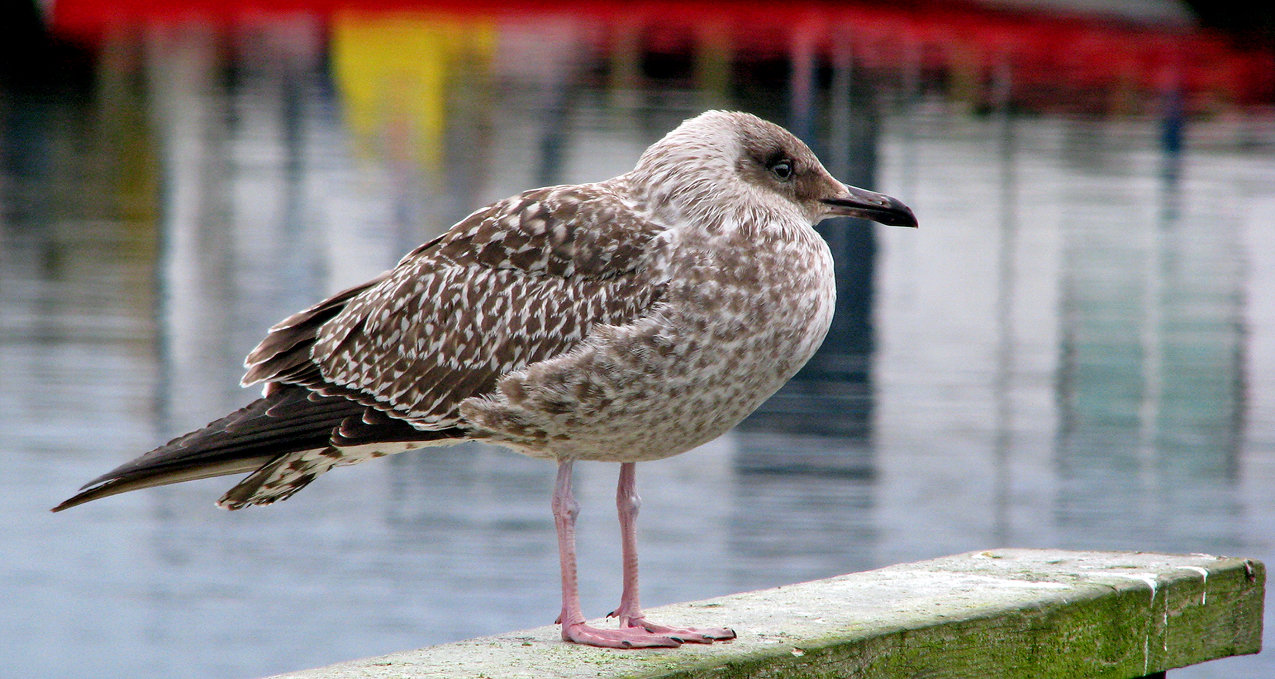
First cycle plumage

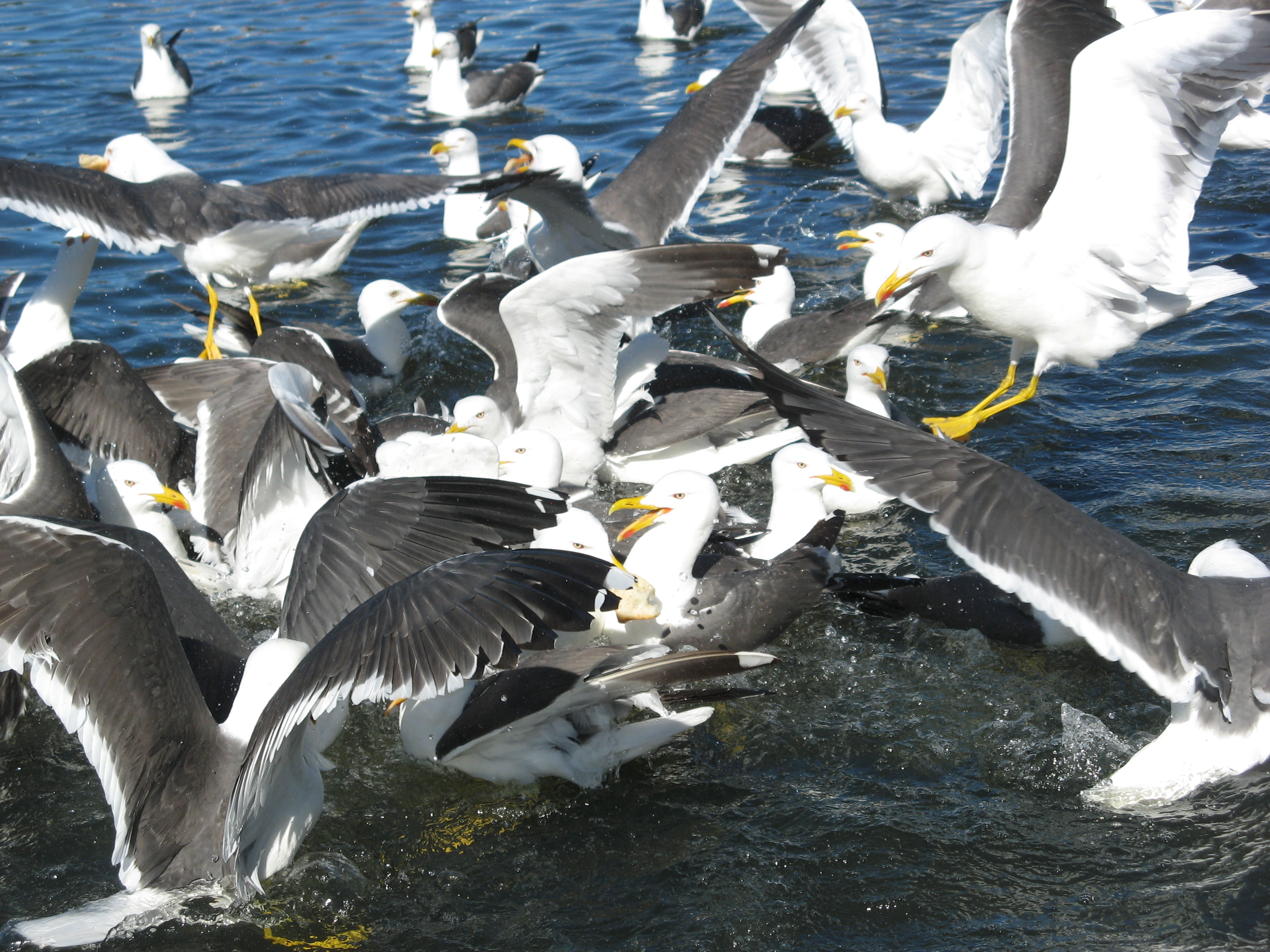
Flying in a lake near the city hall in Reykjavik

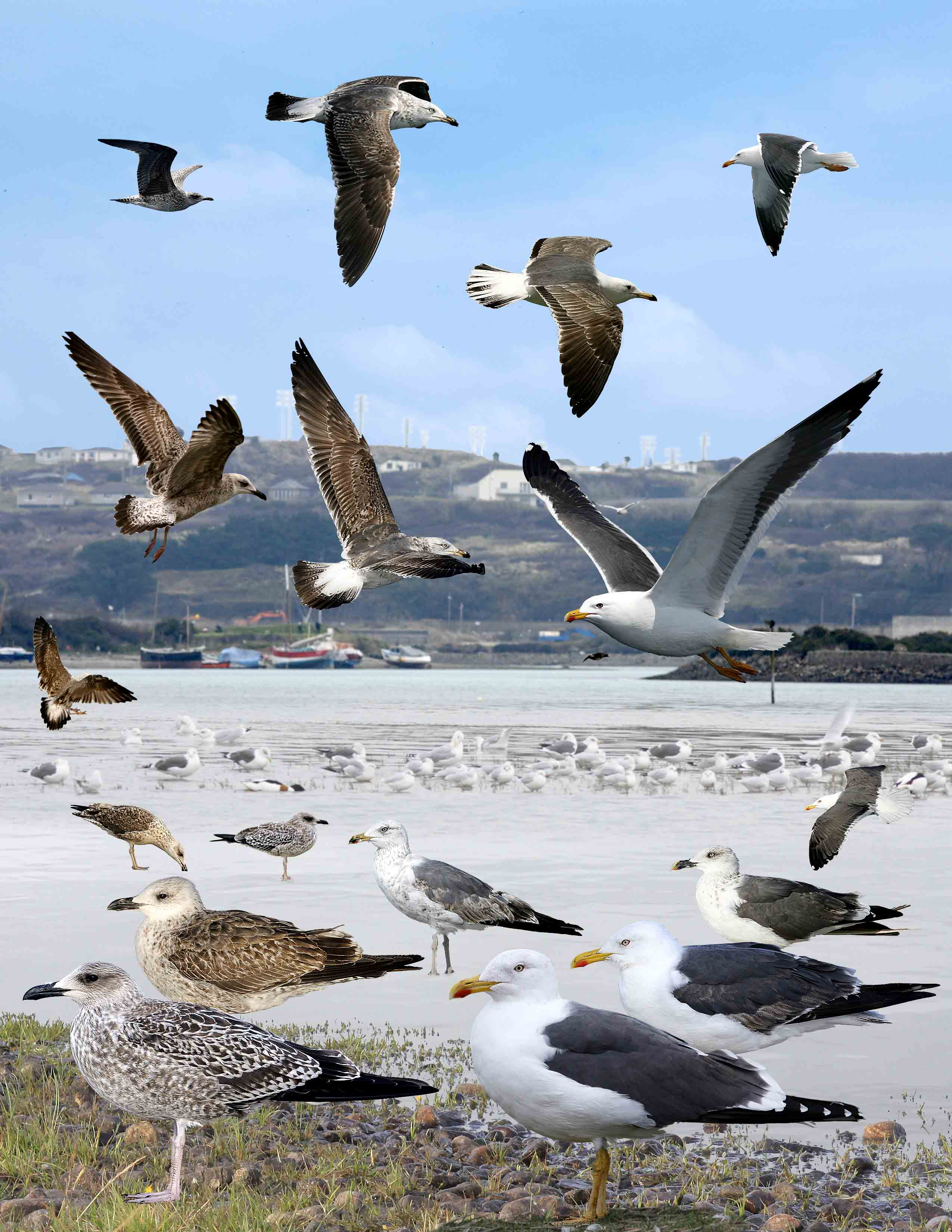
ID composite

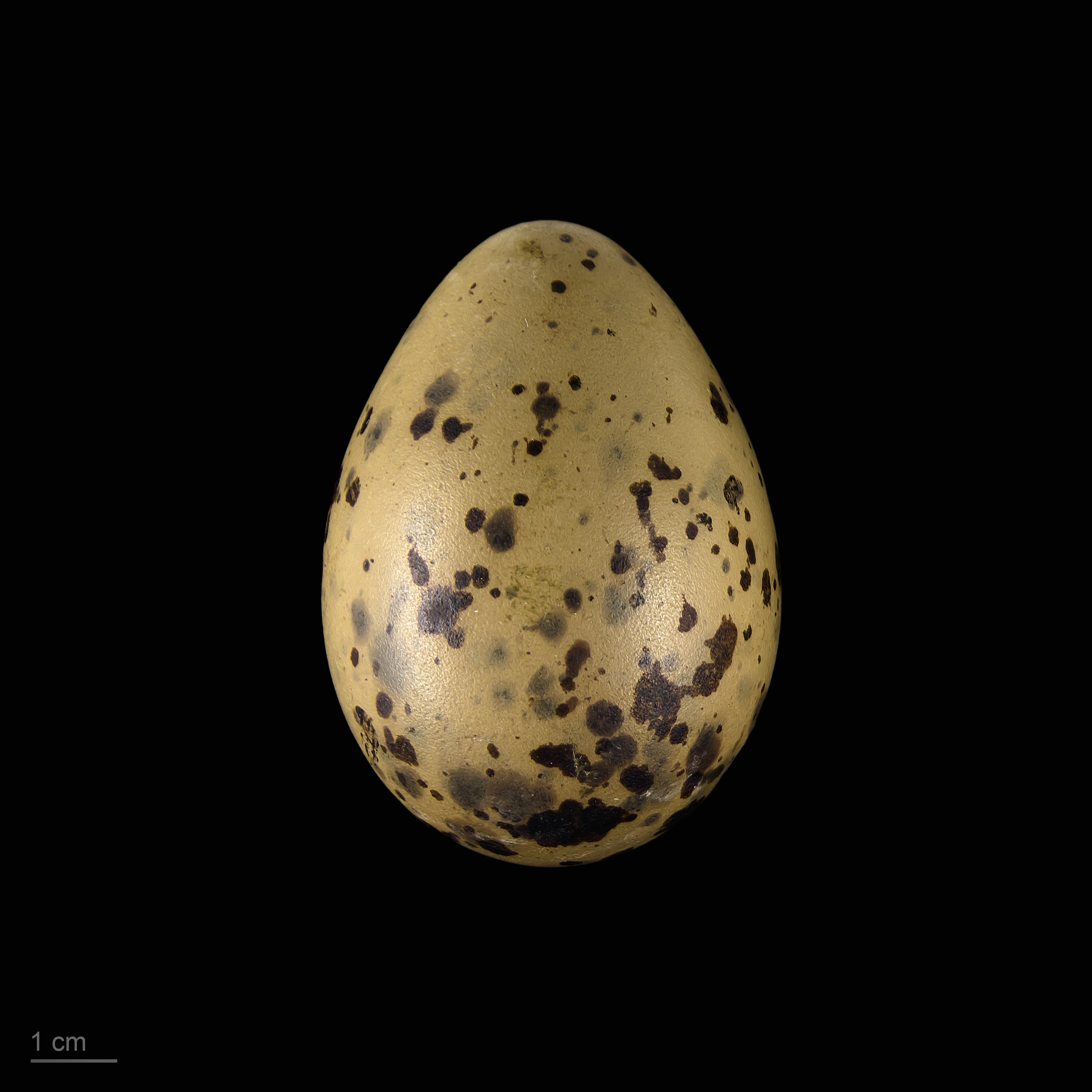
Larus fuscus fuscus – MHNT
