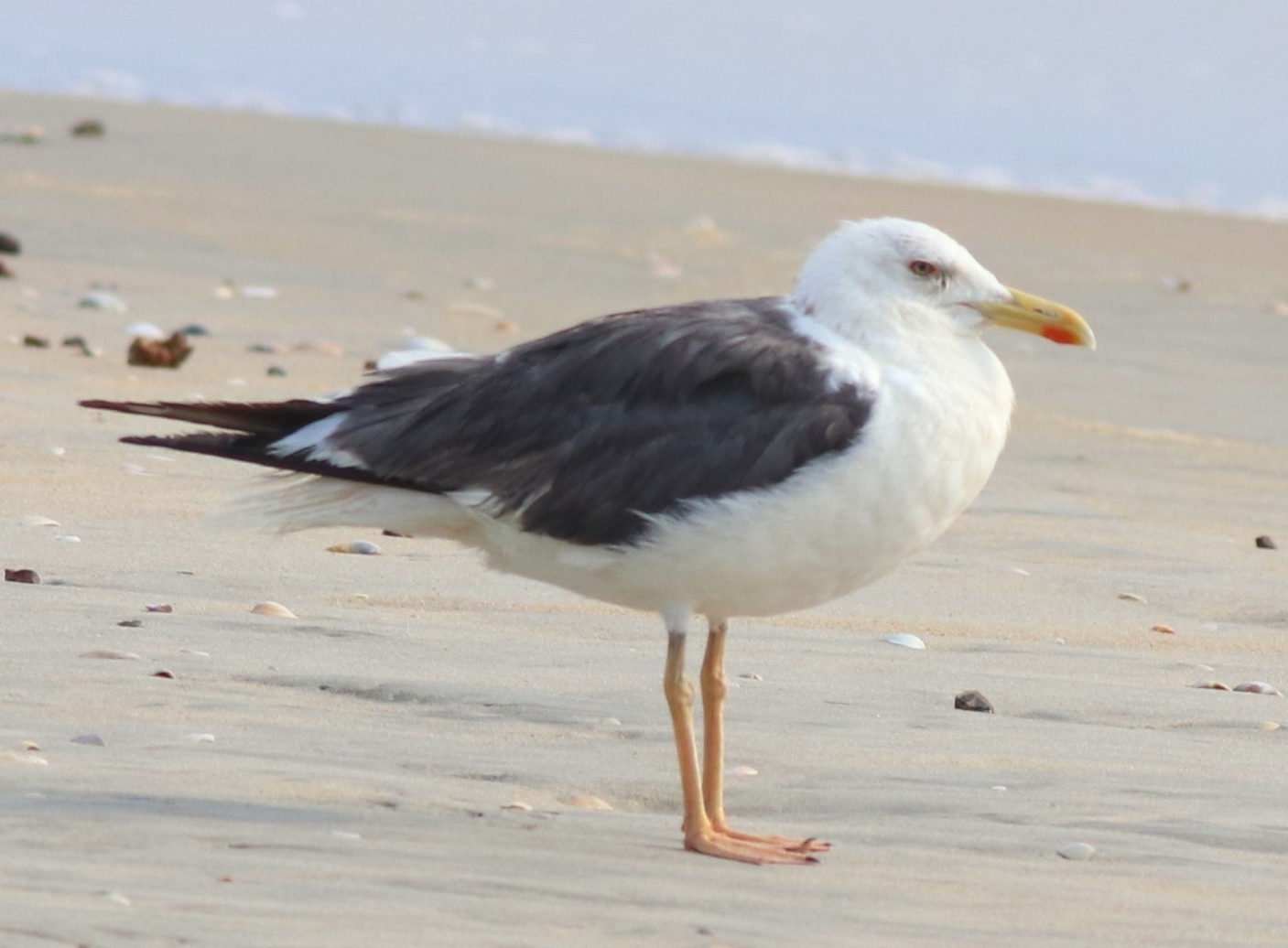

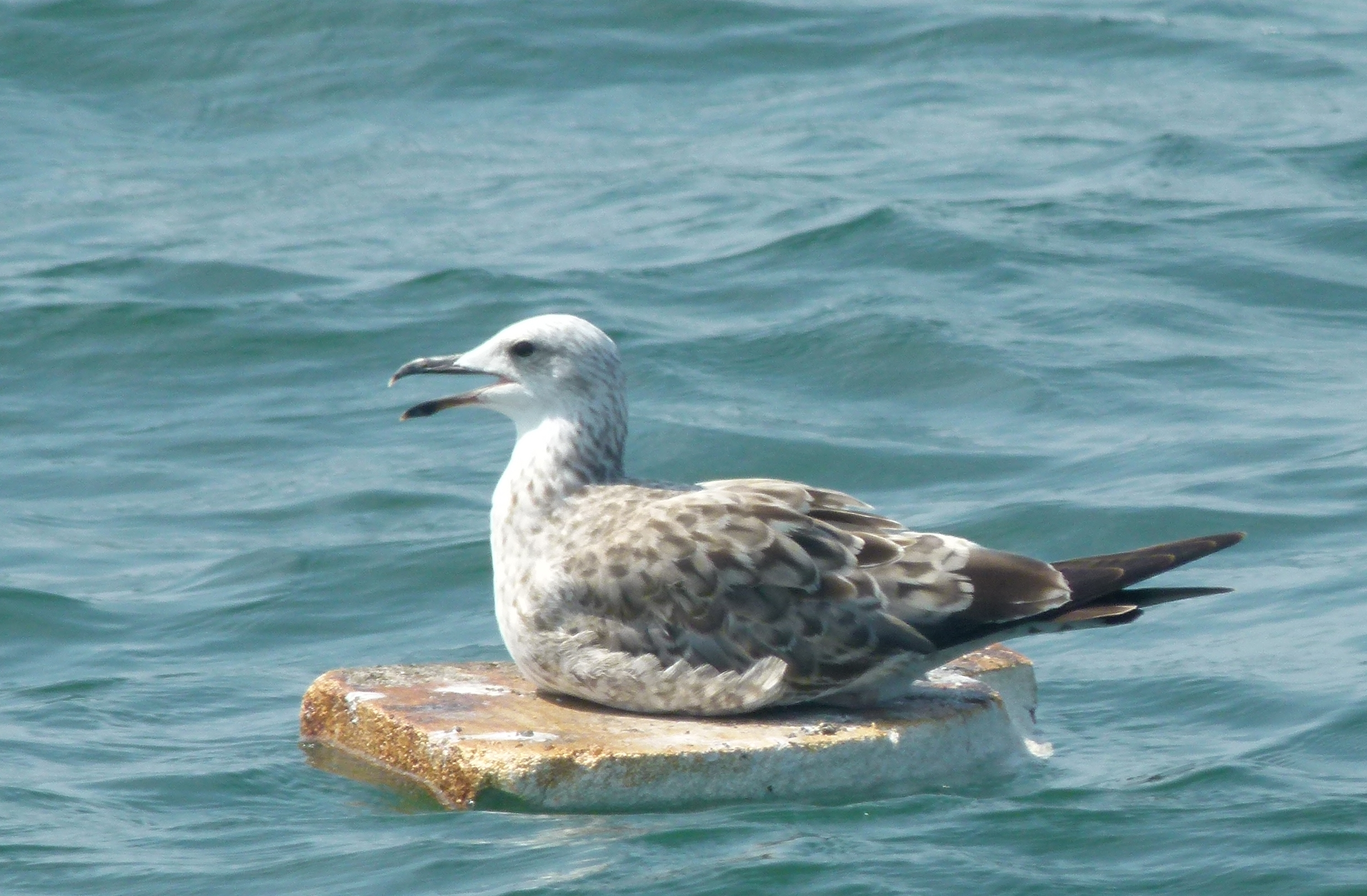
- Adult (top) and subadult (bottom)

Scientific classification
- Kingdom: Animalia
- Phylum: Chordata
- Class: Aves
- Order: Charadriiformes
- Family: Laridae
- Genus: Larus
- Species: L. fuscus
- Subspecies: L. f. heuglini

Trinomial name
- Larus fuscus heuglini Bree, 1876, north Siberia

= Heuglin's gull =

Subspecies of bird

Heuglin's gull, or the Siberian gull (Larus fuscus heuglini), is a seabird in the genus Larus. It is sometimes considered as a separate species (Larus heuglini) but is usually treated as a subspecies of the lesser black-backed gull. Birds in the eastern part of Heuglin's gull's range are often paler grey above and sometimes considered to be a separate subspecies Larus fuscus taimyrensis (Taimyr gull). It is now thought that they are a result of hybridisation between Heuglin's gulls and Vega gulls.

== Distribution and habitat ==
Heuglin's gulls breed in the tundra of northern Russia from the Kola Peninsula east to the Taymyr Peninsula. They are regularly reported from Finland and may breed there. They migrate south to winter in Southwest Asia, the Indian subcontinent, East Asia, and East Africa. Small numbers are seen in the eastern Mediterranean, and also Southeast Asia, and it has been recorded in South Africa. It may occur as a vagrant in Western Europe.

== Description ==
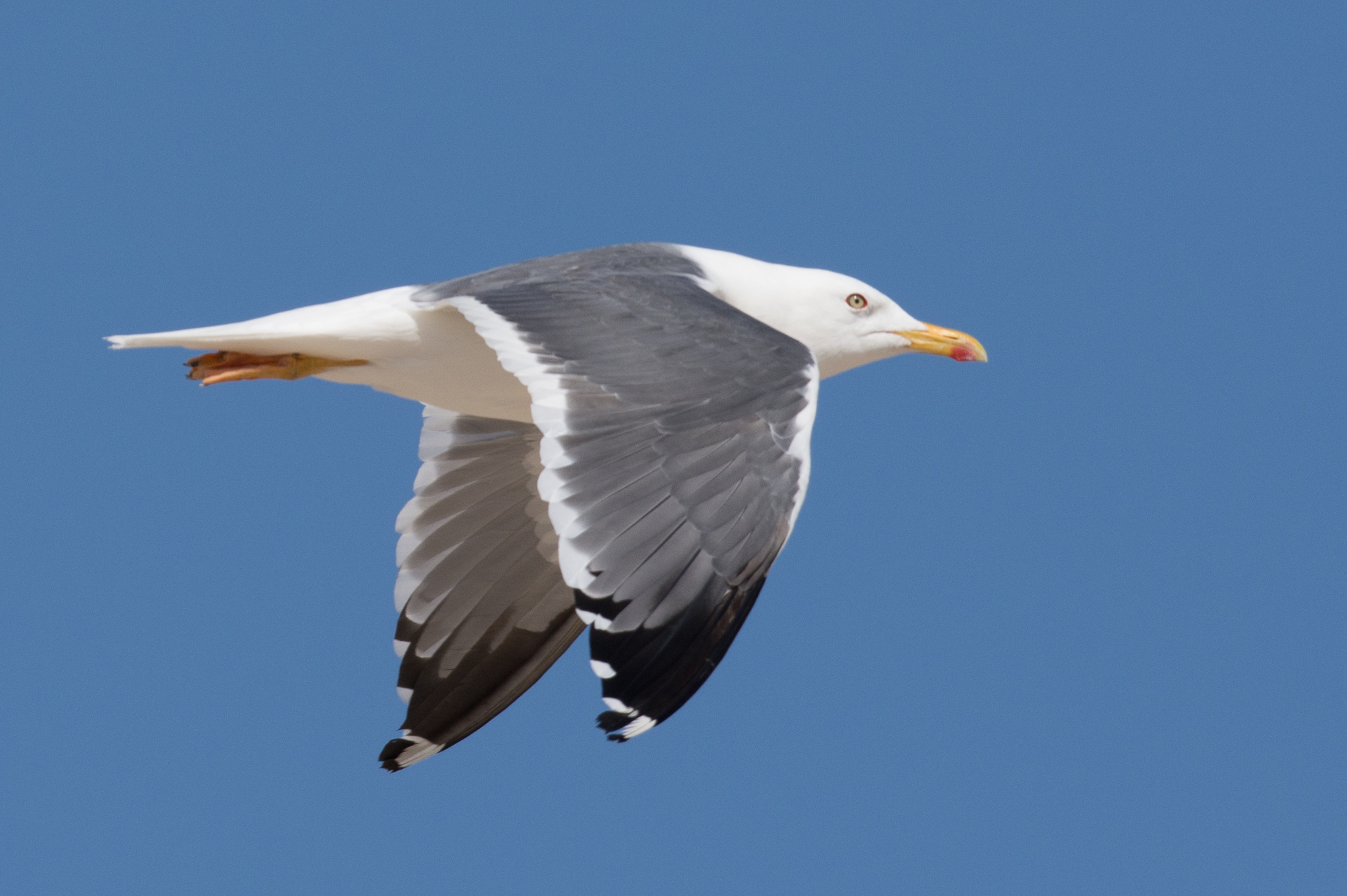
In flight, in Oman

They are large gulls with a rounded head, strong bill and long legs and wings. Length is from 53 to 70 cm (21 to 28 in), wingspan is from 138 to 158 cm (54 to 62 in) and body mass is from 745 to 1,360 g (1.642 to 2.998 lb). Among standard measurements, the wing chord is 40.5 to 46.9 cm (15.9 to 18.5 in), the bill is 4.5 to 6.5 cm (1.8 to 2.6 in) and the tarsus is 5.9 to 7.8 cm (2.3 to 3.1 in). The back and wings are dark grey, variable in shade but often similar to the slightly smaller subspecies L. f. graellsii of the lesser black-backed gull. In winter the head is only lightly streaked with brown but there is heavier streaking on the hindneck. The legs are usually yellow but can be pink.

== Growth ==
Moulting takes place later than in most of their relatives so birds still have unstreaked heads and worn primaries in September and October. The primary feathers may not be fully grown until February or March when the head is still streaked.

== Diet ==
They feed mainly on molluscs, worms, and crustaceans.

== Gallery ==
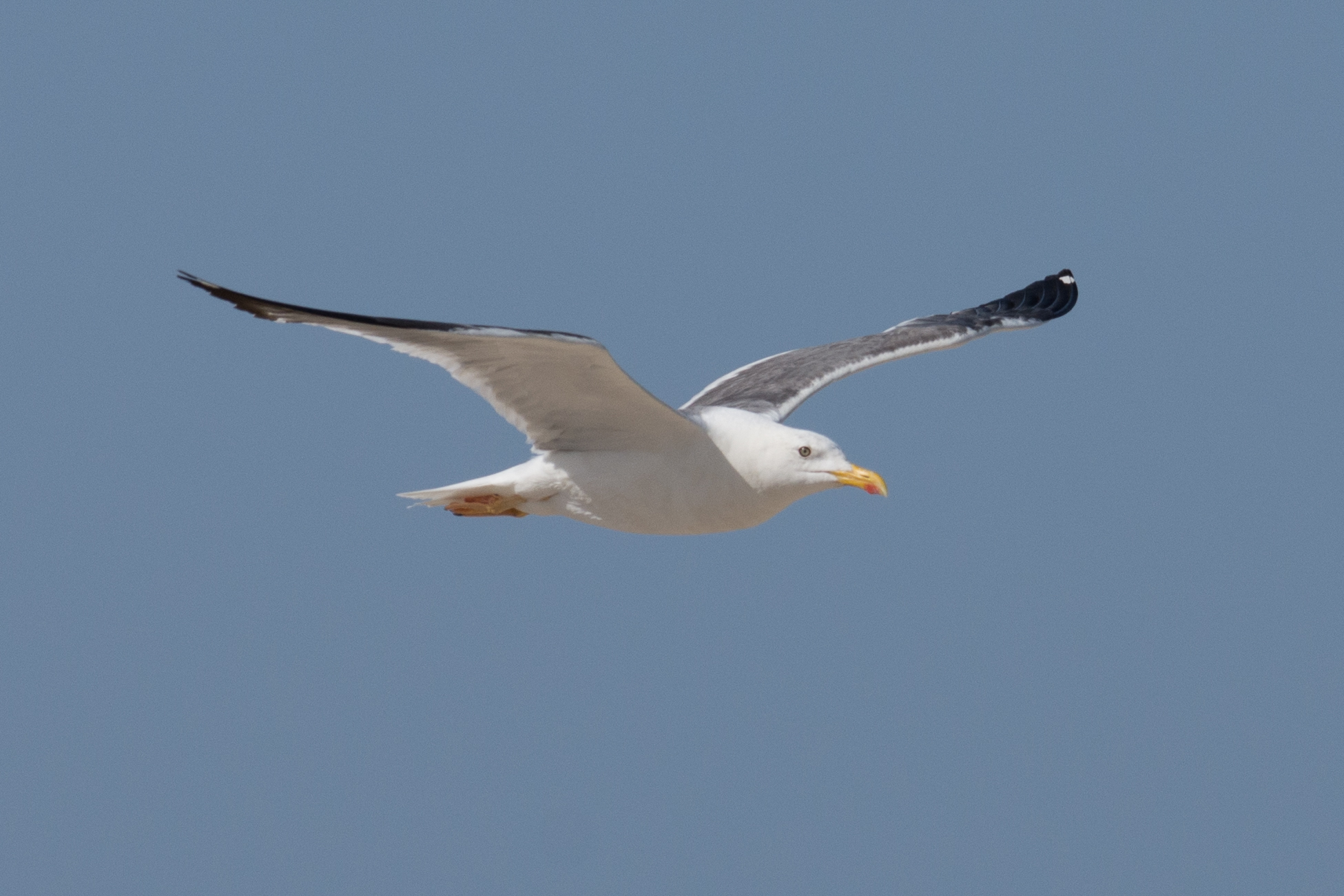
In flight, in Oman

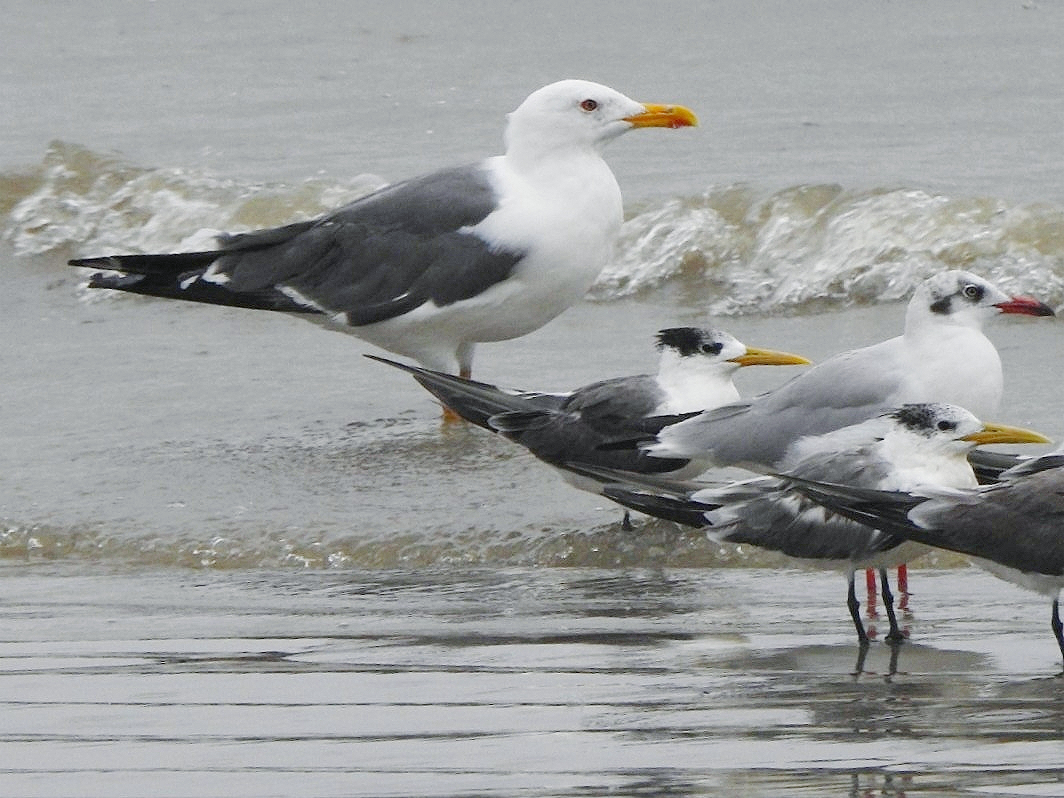
With greater crested terns and a brown-headed gull, in Kerala, India

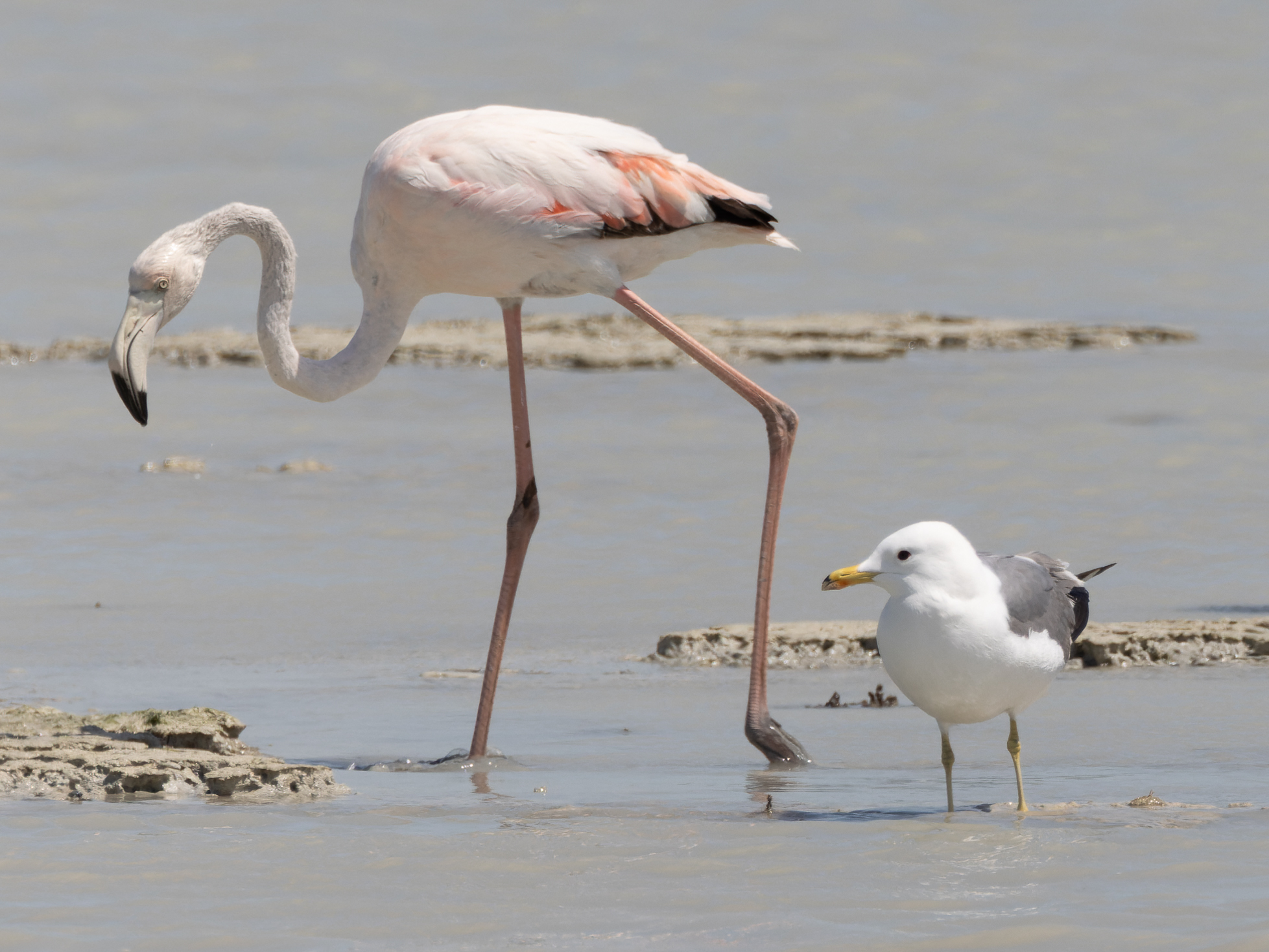
With a greater flamingo, in Bahrain
