= Mien van Bree =

Dutch cyclist (1915–1983)

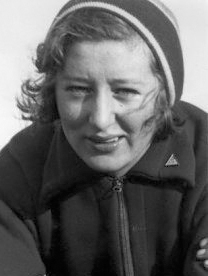
- Mien van Bree
- Born: Wilhelmina Elizabeth van Bree; 24 April 1915 the Tramstraat, Loosduinen
- Died: 4 August 1983 (aged 68)

Wilhelmina Elizabeth (Mien) van Bree (24 April 1915 – 4 August 1983) was a Dutch cyclist. She is considered a pioneer of women's cycling in the Netherlands.

== Early years ==
Van Bree was the fourth of five children in a horticultural family, the daughter of Adrianus van Bree (1878–1959) and Elizabeth Hendrika van Beek (1884–1952). She grew up in the Tramstraat, in Loosduinen, South Holland. Cycling was an early hobby for her. To train and test her speed, she chased after the buses. Her talent was noticed by neighbour Piet Moeskops, five-time sprint world champion (1921–1926). His compliments motivated her to further develop her cycling talent. In 1931, with some girlfriends, she founded the Hague women's cyclist club Vooruitgang Is Ons Streven (VIOS), one of the first Dutch women's cycling clubs. In the Netherlands in the 1930s, girls riding racing bikes was not considered respectable, but Mien van Bree didn't like that.

== Career ==
The Dutch Cycling Union did not allow bicycle races for women, so van Bree moved to Belgium, where women could race. In addition, she cycled early in the morning from Loosduinen to Belgium, to ride a race in the afternoon. She participated in sprint, long distance, couple and tandem races on the track. In 1934 she became third during the world cycling championship and in the years 1935–1937 she finished second. She was always beaten by the Belgian Elvire De Bruyne from Erembodegem.

Van Bree won her first victory in 1937 during the European Cycling Championships. In 1938, after a race of one hundred kilometers in Rocourt, she became world champion. She also extended her European title. A year later, she also extended her world title. During this time she was in a relationship with another rider, Maria Gaudens, who was also a rider.

The outbreak of the Second World War and her recall to Holland in 1940 to care for her ill mother marked the end of her cycling career.

== Later life ==
After the death of her mother in 1952, van Bree cared for her father until his death in 1959. She worked as a psychiatric nursing assistant and was later a patient in the same institution for a time when she was left and betrayed by a girlfriend. On August 4, 1983, she was found dead at her home at the age of 68. She preserved her champion’s jersey until the end of her life.

== Legacy ==
In 2015 (her hundredth year of birth), the municipality of The Hague named a cycle path in Loosduinen after her: the "Mien van Breepad".

On March 24, 2016 a book Mien – A forgotten history was published by writer Mariska Tjoelker.

== Gallery ==
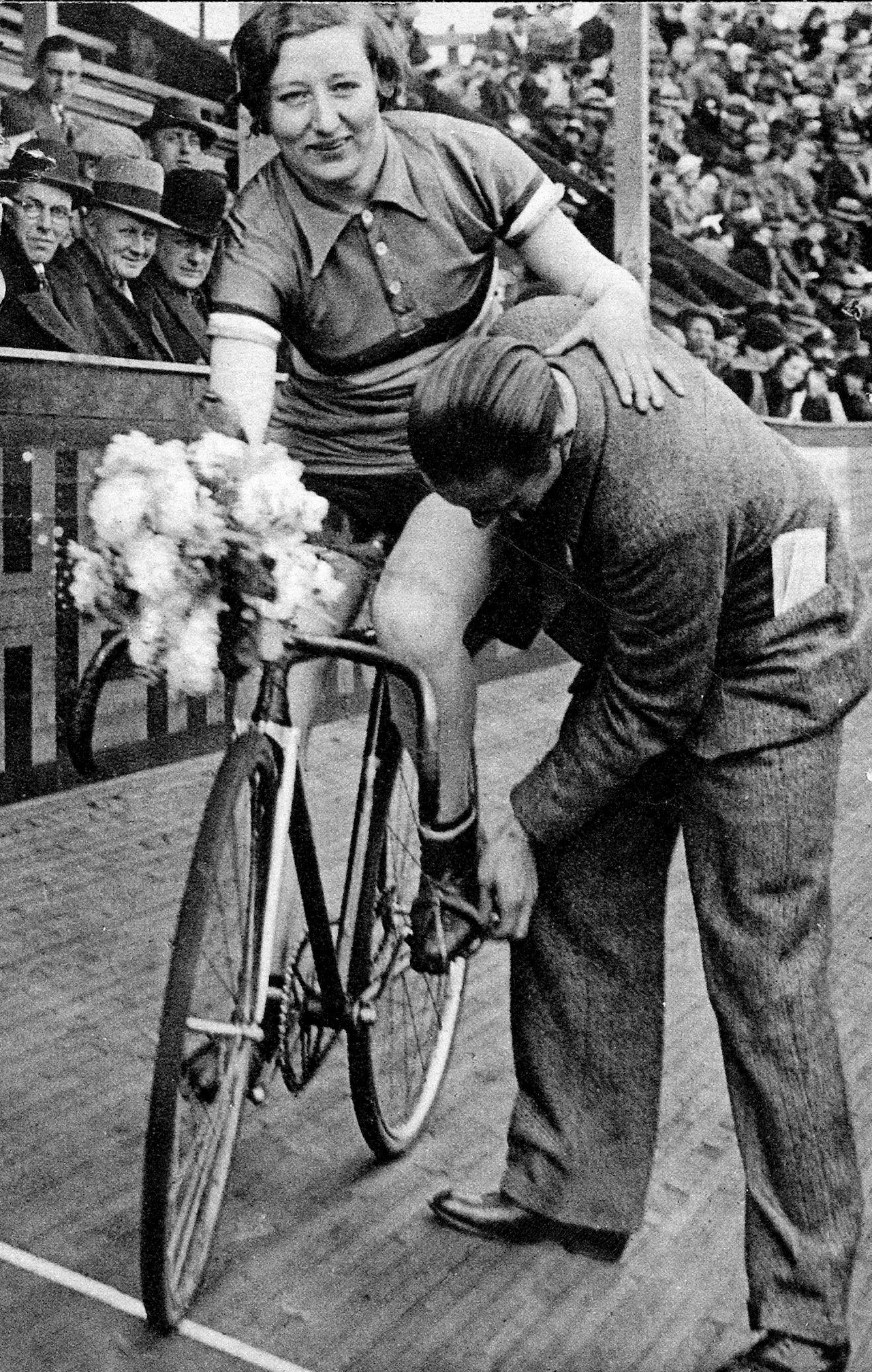
Mien van Bree (1935)

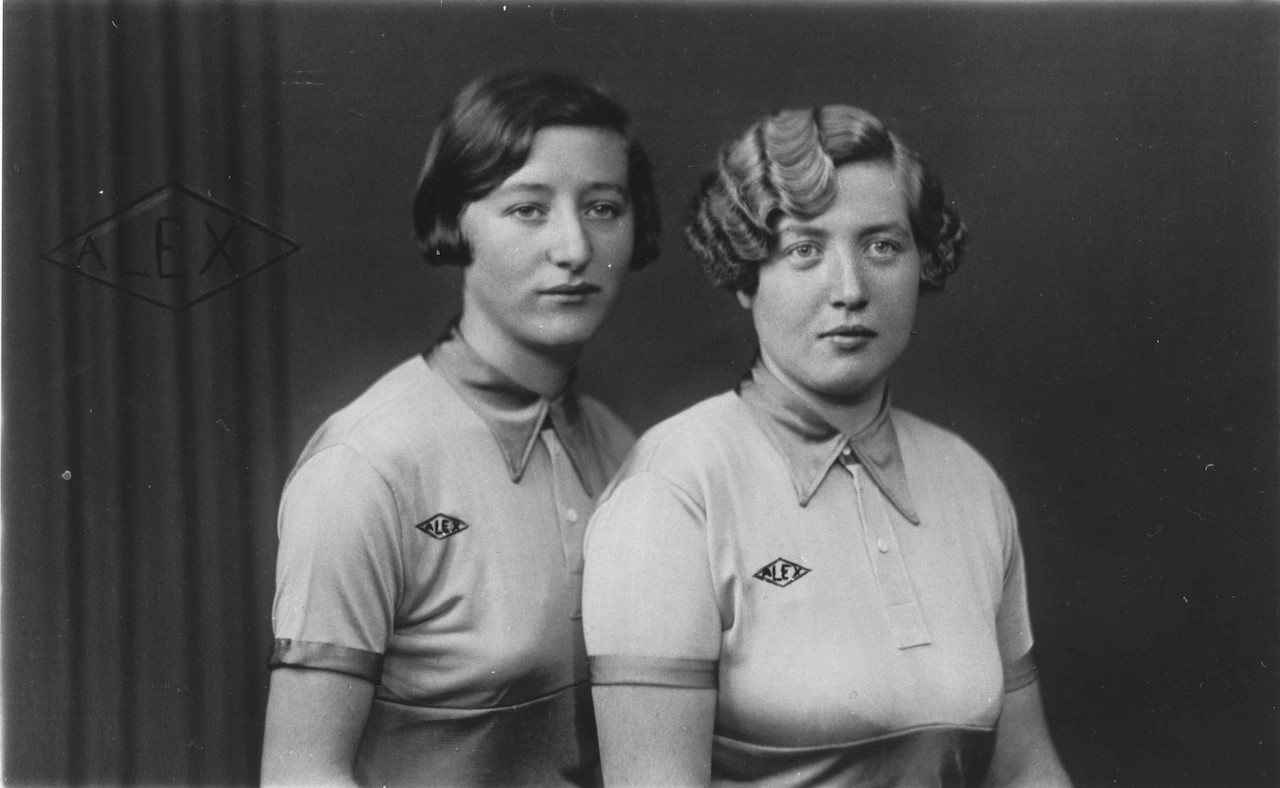
Mien van Bree with Maria Gaudens, 1935

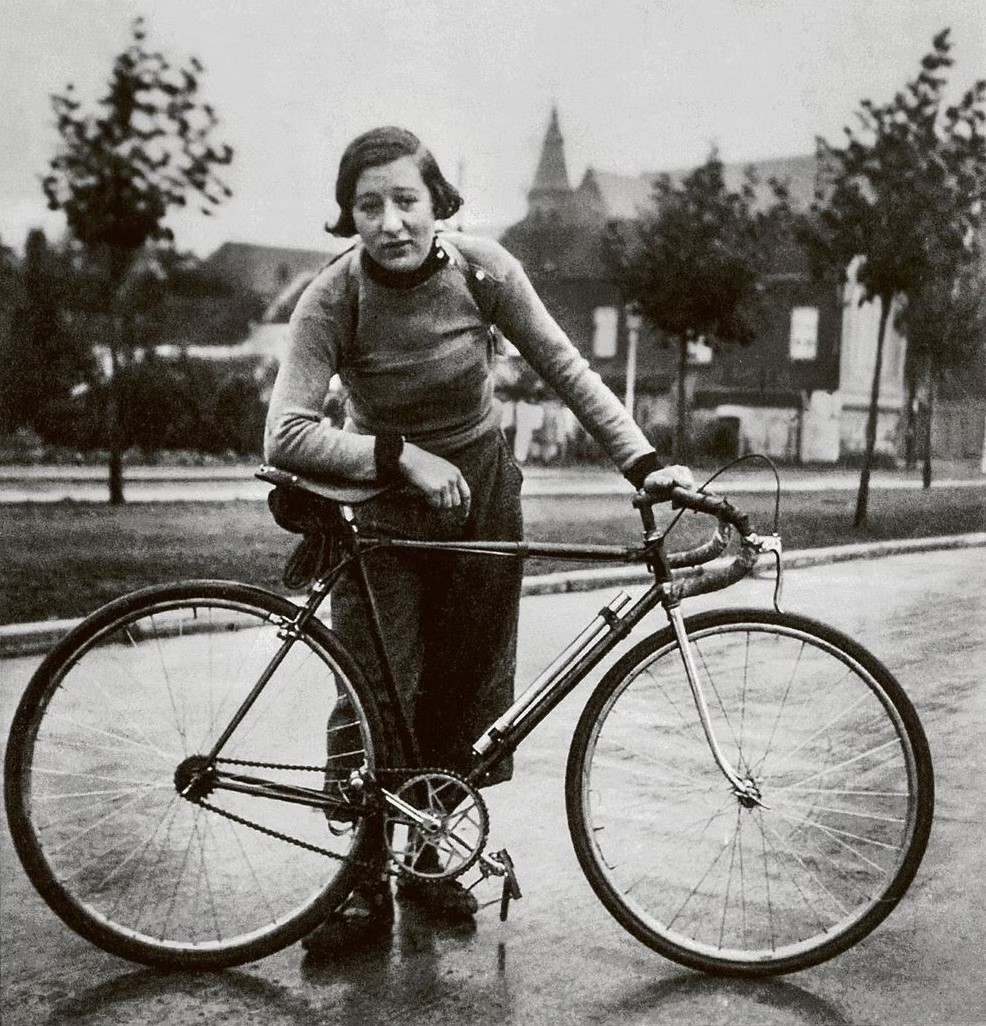
Mien van Bree 1937

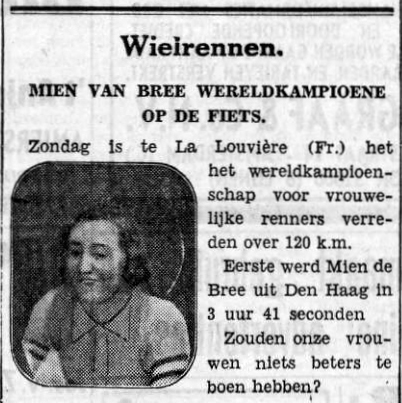
Mien van Bree (1938)
