= Charles Van Bree =

Belgian cyclist (1894–1976)

Personal information
- Born: 8 December 1894 Antwerp, Belgium
- Died: 3 January 1976 (aged 81) Antwerp, Belgium

Cycling career
- Sport: Cycling
- Role: Rider

Charles Van Bree (8 December 1894 – 3 January 1976) was a Belgian racing cyclist. He rode in the 1920 Tour de France.
