= Charles Robert Bree =

British physician

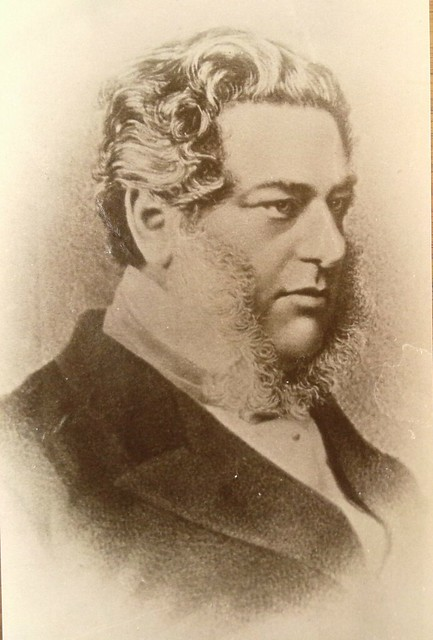
- Born: 11 February 1811; Ambleside
- Died: 17 October 1886 (aged 75)
- Occupation: Physician

Charles Robert Bree (11 February 1811 – 17 October 1886) was a British physician, ornithologist and zoologist, best known for his opposition to Darwin's theory of evolution.

== Biography ==
Born in Ambleside, Bree received his medical education at York and London. He practiced medicine in Bildeston and Stowmarket. He married Frances Elizabeth Henniker in 1845.

Bree obtained his M.D. degree from University of Edinburgh in 1858, presenting the thesis "On the types and treatment of continued fever". He was elected physician to the Essex and Colchester Hospital in 1859 where he worked for 22 years. He authored books on natural history and was joint-editor of the Naturalist journal, with Francis Orpen Morris. He was a Fellow of the Zoological Society of London. Bree rejected Darwin's theory of evolution and argued for creationism. In 1872, he authored An Exposition of the Fallacies in the Hypothesis of Mr. Darwin, which was widely criticized in academic journals.

Bree was a Christian creationist who argued that proof of evolution could never be obtained. However, he did not believe that the scriptures were intended to be authorities on science and his objections to evolution were not Biblically based. He argued that Darwin's theories were speculations without evidence. Charles Darwin and Alfred Russel Wallace criticized Bree for making errors and misconceptions about evolution. Wallace negatively reviewed the book in the Nature journal, stating it contained "numerous errors, misrepresentations, and misconceptions." In a letter to Wallace, Charles Darwin supported his review and described the book as "a mass of inaccuracies & rubbish".

Historian James Moore has described Bree as "one of Darwin's more philosophically-minded critics in Britain".

== Selected publications ==
- Species Not Transmutable, Nor the Result of Secondary Causes (1860)
- A History of the Birds of Europe, not Observed in the British Isles (1864)
  - Volume 1 2 3 4
- Popular Illustrations of the Lower Forms of Life (1868)
- An Exposition of the Fallacies in the Hypothesis of Mr. Darwin (1872)
