= List of Calosoma species =

List of species in genus

This is a list of the species in the genus Calosoma, caterpillar hunters.

== Calosoma species ==
These 164 species belong to the genus Calosoma:

- Callistenia Lapouge, 1929
  - Calosoma dawsoni (Dajoz, 1997)
  - Calosoma dietzii Schaeffer, 1904
  - Calosoma discors LeConte, 1857
  - Calosoma lariversi Van Dyke, 1943
  - Calosoma latipenne G.Horn, 1870
  - Calosoma luxatum Say, 1823
  - Calosoma moniliatum (LeConte, 1852)
  - Calosoma monticola Casey, 1897
  - Calosoma oregonus (Gidaspow, 1959)
  - Calosoma placerum (Gidaspow, 1959)
  - Calosoma schaefferi Breuning, 1928 (synonym: Calosoma striatior Hatch, 1953)
  - Calosoma subaeneum Chaudoir, 1869
  - Calosoma subasperatum Schaeffer, 1915
  - Calosoma wilkesii (LeConte, 1852)
- Callisthenes Fischer von Waldheim, 1820
  - Calosoma anthrax Semenov, 1900
  - Calosoma breviusculum (Mannerheim, 1830)
  - Calosoma elegans (Kirsch, 1859)
  - Calosoma ewersmanni (Chaudoir, 1850)
  - Calosoma fabulosum Semenov & Znojko, 1933
  - Calosoma fischeri (Fischer von Waldheim, 1842)
  - Calosoma kuschakewitschi (Ballion, 1871)
  - Calosoma marginatum Gebler, 1830
  - Calosoma mirificum (Casale, 1979)
  - Calosoma panderi (Fischer von Waldheim, 1820)
  - Calosoma pentheri Apfelbeck, 1918
  - Calosoma persianum (Morvan, 1974)
  - Calosoma regelianum A.Morawitz, 1886
  - Calosoma relictum Apfelbeck, 1918
  - Calosoma reticulatum (Fabricius, 1787)
  - Calosoma usgentense Solsky, 1874
- Callitropa Motschulsky, 1866
  - Calosoma anthracinum Dejean, 1831
  - Calosoma atrovirens Chaudoir, 1869
  - Calosoma chihuahua Gidaspow, 1959
  - Calosoma externum (Say, 1823)
  - Calosoma haydeni G.Horn, 1870
  - Calosoma laeve Dejean, 1826
  - Calosoma macrum LeConte, 1853
  - Calosoma palmeri G.Horn, 1876
  - Calosoma porosifrons Bates, 1891
  - Calosoma protractum LeConte, 1862
  - Calosoma viridisulcatum Chaudoir, 1863
- Calopachys Haury, 1880
  - Calosoma blaptoides Putzeys, 1845
  - Calosoma omiltemium Bates, 1891
  - Calosoma viridissimum (Haury, 1880)
- Calosoma
  - Calosoma aurocinctum Chaudoir, 1850
  - Calosoma beesoni Andrewes, 1919
  - Calosoma cyaneoventre Mandl, 1954
  - Calosoma cyanescens Motschulsky, 1859
  - Calosoma frigidum Kirby, 1837
  - Calosoma himalayanum Gestro, 1875
  - Calosoma inquisitor (Linnaeus, 1758)
  - Calosoma maximoviczi A.Morawitz, 1863
  - Calosoma oceanicum Perroud & Montrouzier, 1864
  - Calosoma schayeri Erichson, 1842
  - Calosoma scrutator (Fabricius, 1775)
  - Calosoma splendidum Dejean, 1831
  - Calosoma sycophanta (Linnaeus, 1758)
  - Calosoma wilcoxi LeConte, 1847
- Camegonia Lapouge, 1924
  - Calosoma marginale Casey, 1897
  - Calosoma parvicolle Fall, 1910
  - Calosoma prominens LeConte, 1853
- Caminara Motschulsky, 1866
  - Calosoma davidis Géhin, 1885
  - Calosoma denticolle Gebler, 1833
  - Calosoma imbricatum Klug, 1832
  - Calosoma olivieri Dejean, 1831
  - Calosoma reitteri Roeschke, 1897
- Campalita Motschulsky, 1866
  - Calosoma algiricum Géhin, 1885
  - Calosoma auropunctatum (Herbst, 1784)
  - Calosoma chinense Kirby, 1819
  - Calosoma chlorostictum Dejean, 1831
  - Calosoma indicum Hope, 1831
  - Calosoma maderae (Fabricius, 1775)
- Carabomimus Kolbe, 1895
  - Calosoma bulleri Beheim & Breuning, 1943
  - Calosoma cicatricosum Chaudoir, 1869
  - Calosoma costipenne Chaudoir, 1869
  - Calosoma depressicolle Chaudoir, 1869
  - Calosoma digueti (Lapouge, 1924)
  - Calosoma flohri Bates, 1884
  - Calosoma laevigatum Chaudoir, 1869
  - Calosoma morelianum Bates, 1891
  - Calosoma orizabae (Jeannel, 1940)
  - Calosoma politum Chaudoir, 1869
  - Calosoma striatulum Chevrolat, 1835
- Carabomorphus Kolbe, 1895
  - Calosoma brachycerum (Gerstaecker, 1884)
  - Calosoma catenatum (Roeschke, 1899)
  - Calosoma harrarense (Jakobson, 1900)
  - Calosoma masaicum (Alluaud, 1912)
- Carabophanus Kolbe, 1895
  - Calosoma antinorii Gestro, 1878
  - Calosoma arrowi Breuning, 1928
  - Calosoma gestroi Breuning, 1928
  - Calosoma raffrayi Fairmaire, 1883
- Carabops Jakobson, 1900
  - Calosoma abyssinicum Gestro, 1881
  - Calosoma aethiopicum Breuning, 1927 (syn: Calosoma vermiculatum (Straneo, 1942))
  - Calosoma burtoni Alluaud, 1913
  - Calosoma janssensi (Basilewsky, 1953)
  - Calosoma nyassicum (Basilewsky, 1984)
  - Calosoma oberthueri Vuillet, 1910
  - Calosoma rugolosum Beheim & Breuning, 1943
- Carabosoma Géhin, 1885
  - Calosoma angulatum Chevrolat, 1834
  - Calosoma eremicola Fall, 1910
  - Calosoma glabratum Dejean, 1831
  - Calosoma peregrinator Guérin-Méneville, 1844
  - Calosoma sponsa Casey, 1897
- Castrida Motschulsky, 1866
  - Calosoma abbreviatum Chaudoir, 1869
  - Calosoma alternans (Fabricius, 1792)
  - Calosoma argentinense Csiki, 1927
  - Calosoma fulgens Chaudoir, 1869
  - Calosoma galapageium Hope, 1838
  - Calosoma granatense Géhin, 1885
  - Calosoma leleuporum (Basilewsky, 1968)
  - Calosoma linelli Mutchler, 1925
  - Calosoma peruviense Mandl, 1971
  - Calosoma retusum (Fabricius, 1775)
  - Calosoma rufipenne Dejean, 1831
  - Calosoma sayi Dejean, 1826
  - Calosoma trapezipenne Chaudoir, 1869
  - Calosoma vagans Dejean, 1831
- Charmosta Motschulsky, 1866
  - Calosoma investigator (Illiger, 1798)
  - Calosoma lugens Chaudoir, 1869
- Chrysostigma Kirby, 1837
  - Calosoma affine Chaudoir, 1843
  - Calosoma ampliator Bates, 1891
  - Calosoma calidum (Fabricius, 1775)
  - Calosoma cancellatum Eschscholtz, 1833
  - Calosoma lepidum LeConte, 1845
  - Calosoma morrisonii G.Horn, 1885
  - Calosoma obsoletum Say, 1823
  - Calosoma semilaeve LeConte, 1852
  - Calosoma simplex LeConte, 1878
  - Calosoma tepidum LeConte, 1852
- Ctenosta Motschulsky, 1866
  - Calosoma bastardi Alluaud, 1925
  - Calosoma grandidieri Maindron, 1900
  - Calosoma guineense Imhoff, 1843
  - Calosoma orientale Hope, 1833
  - Calosoma planicolle Chaudoir, 1869
  - Calosoma roeschkei Breuning, 1927
  - Calosoma scabrosum Chaudoir, 1843
  - Calosoma senegalense Dejean, 1831
  - Calosoma strandi Breuning, 1934
- Elgonorites Jeannel, 1940
  - Calosoma alinderi Breuning, 1928
  - Calosoma kenyense Breuning, 1928
  - Calosoma elgonense (Burgeon, 1928)
- Neocalosoma Breuning, 1927
  - Calosoma bridgesi Chaudoir, 1869
- Orinodromus Kolbe, 1895
  - Calosoma deckeni (Gerstaecker, 1867)
  - Calosoma glaciale (Kolbe, 1905)
  - Calosoma leleupi (Basilewsky, 1962)
  - Calosoma neumanni (Kolbe, 1895)
  - Calosoma volkensi (Kolbe, 1895)
- Not assigned
  - † Calosoma agassizii Oustalet, 1874
  - † Calosoma brunneum Zhang; Liu & Shangguan, 1989
  - † Calosoma calvini Wickham, 1909
  - † Calosoma caraboides Heer, 1860
  - † Calosoma catenulatum Heer, 1865
  - † Calosoma ceresti Nel, 1989
  - † Calosoma cockerelli Wickham, 1910
  - † Calosoma deplanatum Heer, 1860
  - † Calosoma emmonsii Scudder, 1900
  - † Calosoma escheri Heer, 1860
  - † Calosoma escrobiculatum Heer, 1860
  - † Calosoma fernquisti Cockerell, 1924
  - † Calosoma heeri Scudder, 1895
  - † Calosoma jaccardi Heer, 1860
  - † Calosoma kimi Lee and Nam, 2021
  - † Calosoma nauckianum Heer, 1860
