= Calosoma porosifrons =

Scientific classification
- Domain: Eukaryota
- Kingdom: Animalia
- Phylum: Arthropoda
- Class: Insecta
- Order: Coleoptera
- Suborder: Adephaga
- Family: Carabidae
- Genus: Calosoma
- Species: C. porosifrons

Binomial name
- Calosoma porosifrons Bates, 1891

Synonyms
- Calosoma laevifrons Breuning, 1931

Species of beetle

Calosoma porosifrons, the porous-fronted caterpillar hunter, is a species of ground beetle in the subfamily of Carabinae. It was described by Henry Walter Bates in 1891. This species is found in Mexico (Durango), where it inhabits oak/pine forests.

Adults are brachypterous.
