= Calosoma fulgens =

Scientific classification
- Domain: Eukaryota
- Kingdom: Animalia
- Phylum: Arthropoda
- Class: Insecta
- Order: Coleoptera
- Suborder: Adephaga
- Family: Carabidae
- Genus: Calosoma
- Species: C. fulgens

Binomial name
- Calosoma fulgens Chaudoir, 1869

Species of beetle

Calosoma fulgens, the shining caterpillar hunter, is a species of ground beetle in the subfamily of Carabinae. It was described by Maximilien Chaudoir in 1869. This species is found in Bolivia, Paraguay, Colombia, Ecuador and Peru, where it inhabits grasslands, prairies and savannas.

Adults have been recorded preying on an unidentified armyworm species.
