= Calosoma protractum =

Scientific classification
- Domain: Eukaryota
- Kingdom: Animalia
- Phylum: Arthropoda
- Class: Insecta
- Order: Coleoptera
- Suborder: Adephaga
- Family: Carabidae
- Genus: Calosoma
- Species: C. protractum

Binomial name
- Calosoma protractum LeConte, 1862

Synonyms
- Calosoma truncatum Géhin, 1885; Calosoma dolens Chaudoir, 1869

Species of beetle

Calosoma protractum, the attractive caterpillar hunter, is a species of ground beetle in the subfamily Carabinae. It was described by John Lawrence LeConte in 1852. This species is found in Mexico (Durango, Guanajuato, Guerrero, Jalisco, Michoacan, Morelos, Nayarit, Puebla, Oaxaca, Sonora) and Arizona, where it is found in midland areas in acacia scrub.

The species is 22–29 millimetres (0.87–1.14 in) long and black. It flies in June and October.
