= Calosoma indicum =

Scientific classification
- Domain: Eukaryota
- Kingdom: Animalia
- Phylum: Arthropoda
- Class: Insecta
- Order: Coleoptera
- Suborder: Adephaga
- Family: Carabidae
- Subfamily: Carabinae
- Tribe: Carabini
- Genus: Calosoma
- Species: C. indicum

Binomial name
- Calosoma indicum Hope, 1831

Synonyms
- Calosoma tanganyicae (Jeannel, 1940); Calosoma tanganyikae (Jeannel, 1940); Calosoma sculpturi Hashmi, Kamaluddin & Hussain, 2005; Calosoma stratum Hashmi, Kamaluddin & Hussain, 2005; Calosoma densegranulatum Mandl, 1954; Calosoma (Campalita) kashmirense Breuning, 1927; Calosoma nivale Breuning, 1927; Calosoma nigrum Parry, 1845; Campalita nivicola Lapouge, 1930; Calosoma scabripenne Chaudoir, 1869; Campalita tanganyicae Jeannel, 1940

Species of beetle

Calosoma indicum is a species in the beetle family Carabidae, found in Afghanistan, Tanzania, Pakistan, Nepal, and India.
