= Calosoma lariversi =

Scientific classification
- Domain: Eukaryota
- Kingdom: Animalia
- Phylum: Arthropoda
- Class: Insecta
- Order: Coleoptera
- Suborder: Adephaga
- Family: Carabidae
- Genus: Calosoma
- Species: C. lariversi

Binomial name
- Calosoma lariversi Van Dyke, 1943

Synonyms
- Callisthenes lariversi

Species of beetle

Calosoma lariversi, Lariver's beautiful black searcher, is a species of ground beetle in the subfamily of Carabinae. It was described by Van Dyke in 1943. This species is found in California and Nevada, where it inhabits the Great Basin desert.

Adults are brachypterous.
