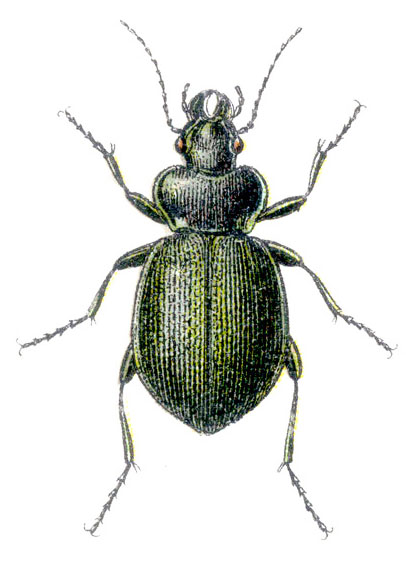

Scientific classification
- Kingdom: Animalia
- Phylum: Arthropoda
- Clade: Pancrustacea
- Class: Insecta
- Order: Coleoptera
- Suborder: Adephaga
- Family: Carabidae
- Genus: Calosoma
- Species: C. reticulatum

Binomial name
- Calosoma reticulatum (Fabricius, 1787)

Synonyms
- Carabus reticulatus Fabricius, 1787; Callisthenes earinus Obydov & Pütz, 1996

= Calosoma reticulatum =

Species of beetle

Calosoma reticulatum, is a species of ground beetle native to northern Europe and Central Europe.

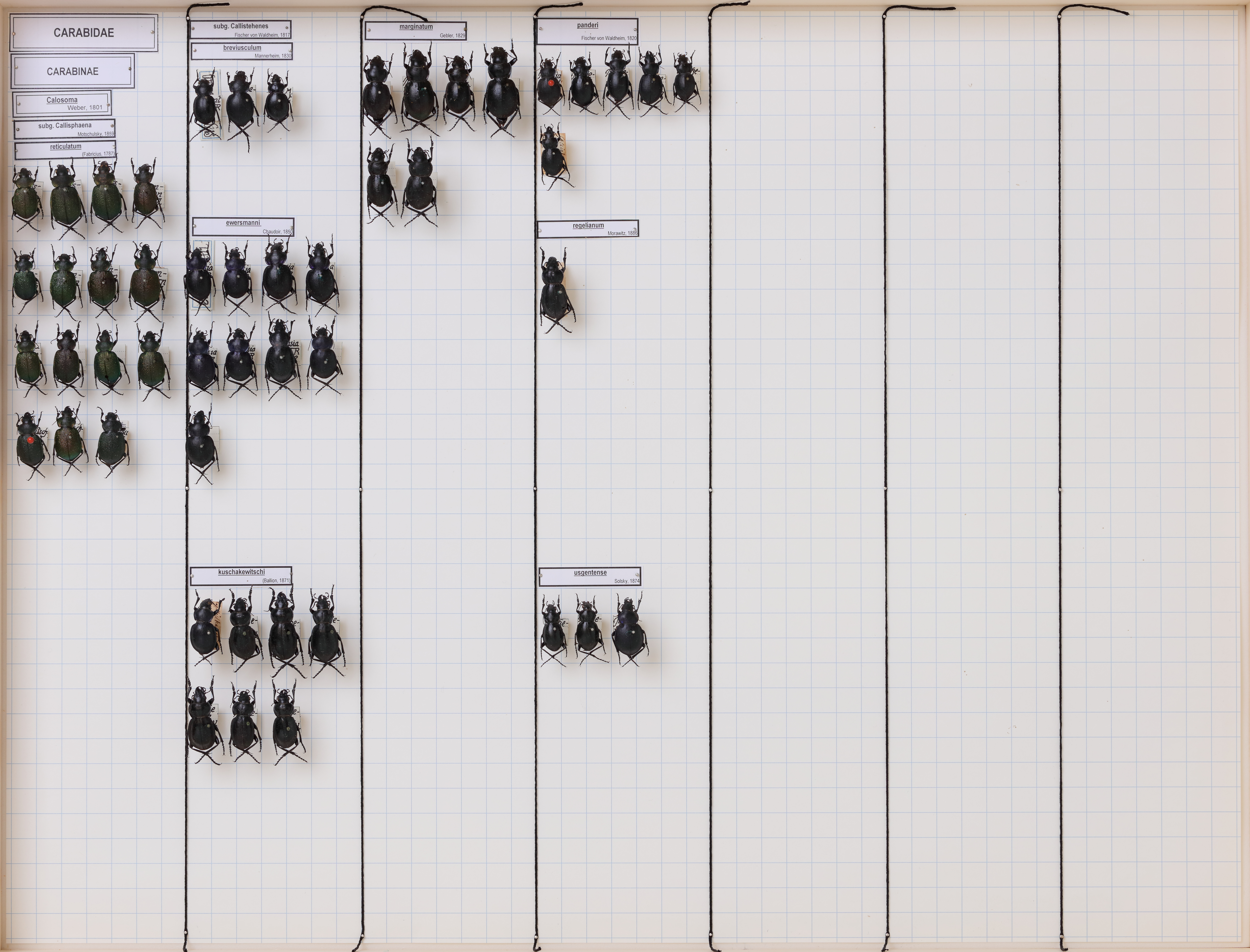
Museum specimens

It occurs in open steppe areas and in fields (in particular, beet). In Europe, most of the finds were made in dry steppes and pine forests, on sandy soil. Beetles are active in spring and early summer, but also occur in August-September. Egg laying is carried out in May-June, on average, the female lays 60-70 eggs. Preimaginal development lasts about 2 months. Beetles overwinter in the soil. The new generation appears in April, early May. Predator-polyphage; hunts at night mainly for caterpillars, as well as other invertebrates.
