= Calosoma rugolosum =

Scientific classification
- Kingdom: Animalia
- Phylum: Arthropoda
- Class: Insecta
- Order: Coleoptera
- Suborder: Adephaga
- Family: Carabidae
- Genus: Calosoma
- Species: C. rugolosum

Binomial name
- Calosoma rugolosum Beheim & Breuning, 1943

Species of beetle

Calosoma rugolosum is a species of beetle of the Carabidae family. This species is found in northern Tanzania.

Adults reach a length of 20–24 mm and are brachypterous.
