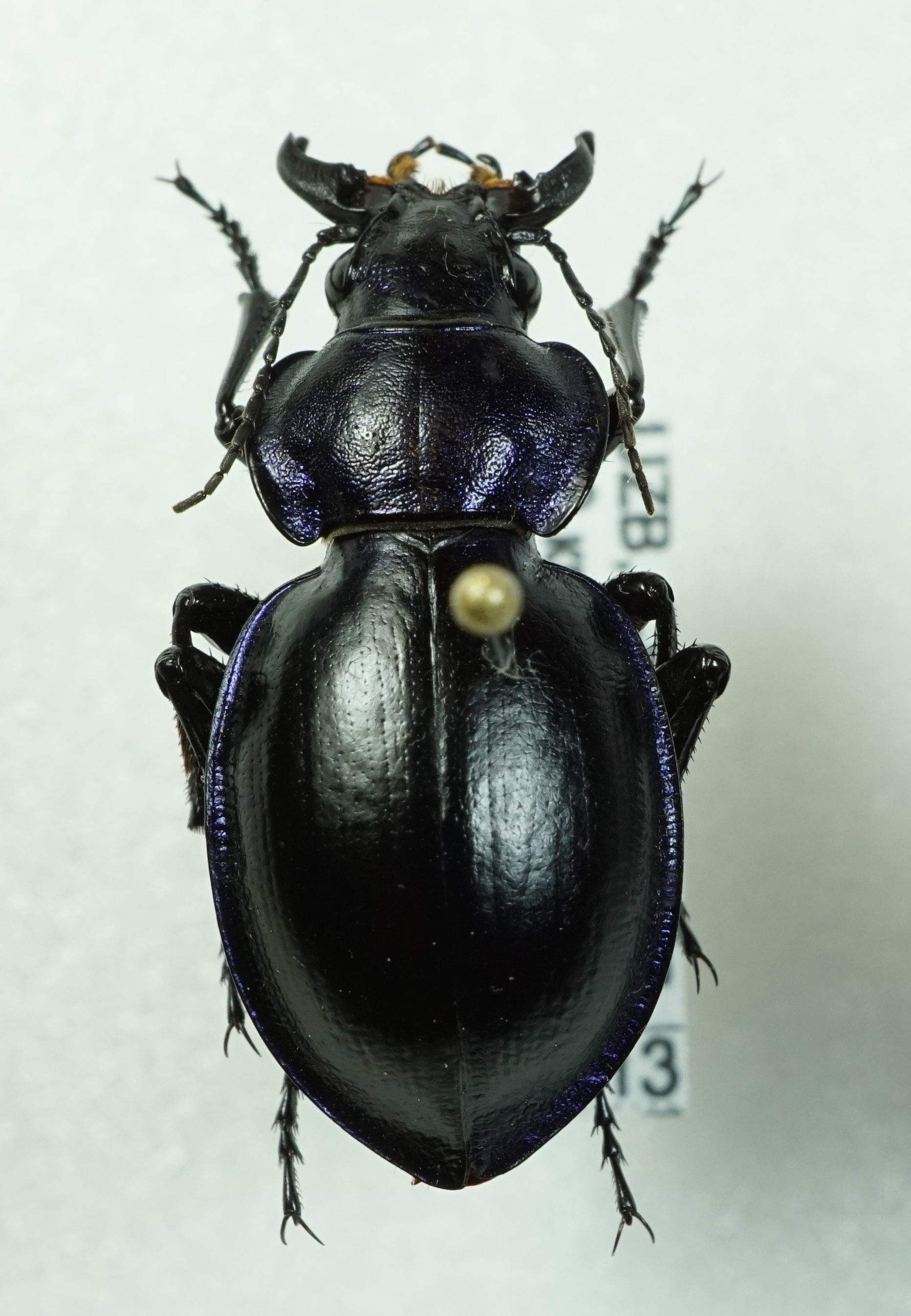
- Female Calosoma kuschakewitschi glasunovi

Scientific classification
- Kingdom: Animalia
- Phylum: Arthropoda
- Class: Insecta
- Order: Coleoptera
- Suborder: Adephaga
- Family: Carabidae
- Subfamily: Carabinae
- Tribe: Carabini
- Genus: Calosoma
- Species: C. kuschakewitschi

Binomial name
- Calosoma kuschakewitschi (Ballion, 1871)

Synonyms
- Calosoma glasunovi; Callisthenes kuschakewitschi Ballion, 1871; Callisthenes solskyanus Obydov, 1999; Calosoma decolor A.Morawitz, 1886; Callisthenes sidzhakensis Obydov, 2008; Callisthenes plasoni Born, 1917; Calosoma pseudokarelini Mandl, 1954

= Calosoma kuschakewitschi =

Species of beetle

Calosoma kuschakewitschi is a species of ground beetle in the family Carabidae. It is found in Kazakhstan, Uzbekistan, and Kyrgyzstan.

== Subspecies ==
These four subspecies belong to the species Calosoma kuschakewitschi:

- Calosoma kuschakewitschi batesoni Semenov & Redikorzev, 1928 (Kazakhstan)
- Calosoma kuschakewitschi glasunowi Semenov, 1900 (Uzbekistan)
- Calosoma kuschakewitschi kuschakewitschi (Ballion, 1871) (Kazakhstan and Uzbekistan)
- Calosoma kuschakewitschi plasoni (Born, 1917) (Kazakhstan and Kyrgyzstan)
