= Calosoma dietzii =

Scientific classification
- Domain: Eukaryota
- Kingdom: Animalia
- Phylum: Arthropoda
- Class: Insecta
- Order: Coleoptera
- Suborder: Adephaga
- Family: Carabidae
- Genus: Calosoma
- Species: C. dietzii

Binomial name
- Calosoma dietzii Schaeffer, 1904

Synonyms
- Callisthenes dietzii; Callisthenes gravidulus Casey, 1913

Species of beetle

Calosoma dietzii, or Dietz's beautiful black searcher, is a species of beetle of the Carabidae family. This species is found in California, where it inhabits open dry grasslands and mountain meadows.

Adults are brachypterous.
