= Calosoma eremicola =

Scientific classification
- Domain: Eukaryota
- Kingdom: Animalia
- Phylum: Arthropoda
- Class: Insecta
- Order: Coleoptera
- Suborder: Adephaga
- Family: Carabidae
- Genus: Calosoma
- Species: C. eremicola

Binomial name
- Calosoma eremicola Fall, 1910

Synonyms
- Acamegonia incerta Lapouge, 1924; Calosoma hospes Casey, 1913; Calosoma rugosipenne Schaeffer, 1911

Species of beetle

Calosoma eremicola, the solitary caterpillar hunter, is a species of ground beetle in the subfamily of Carabinae. It was described by Fall in 1910. This species in found in Baja California, California, New Mexico and Nevada, where it inhabits the eastern Mojave Desert vegetation zone.
