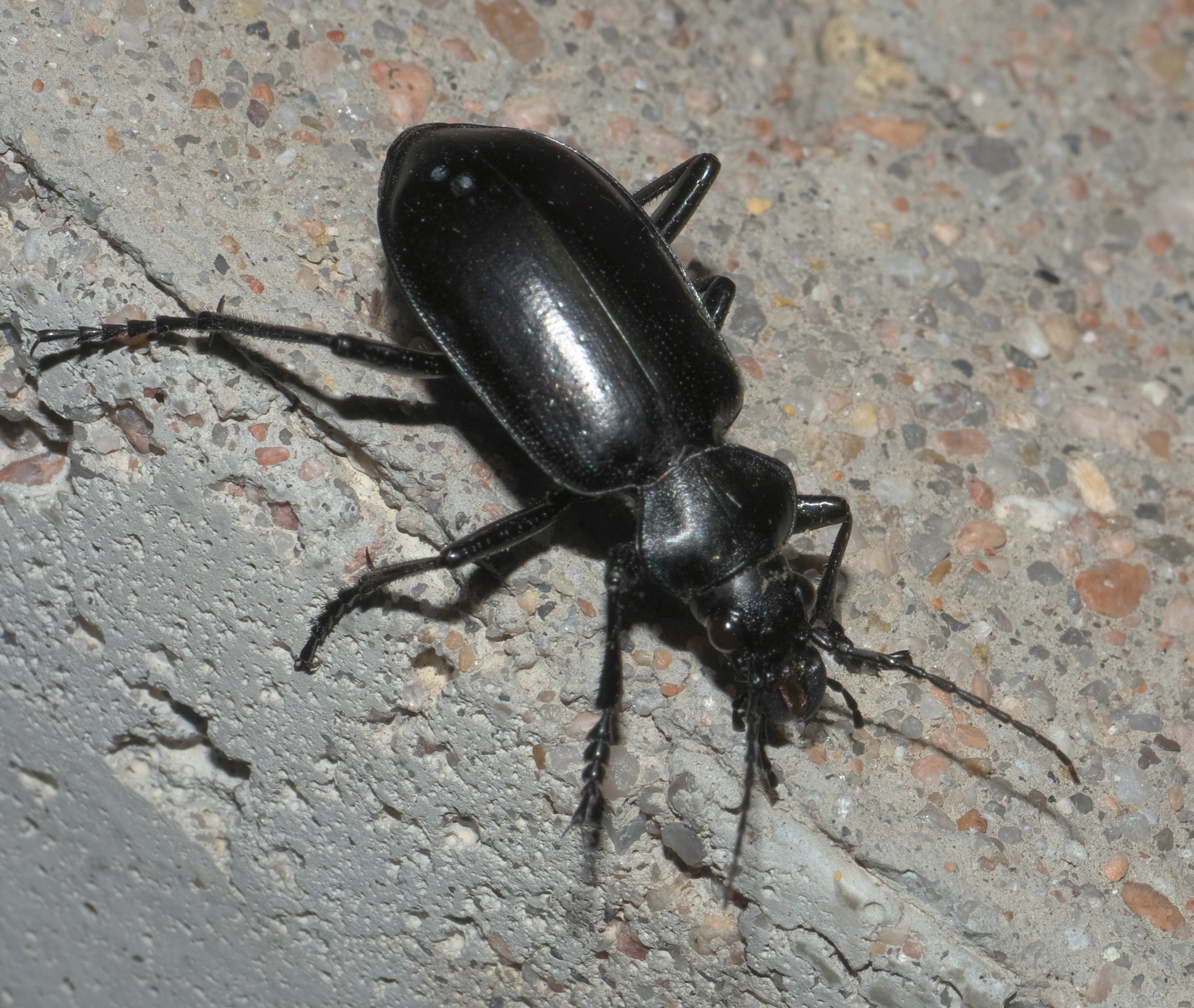

Scientific classification
- Kingdom: Animalia
- Phylum: Arthropoda
- Clade: Pancrustacea
- Class: Insecta
- Order: Coleoptera
- Suborder: Adephaga
- Family: Carabidae
- Genus: Calosoma
- Species: C. peregrinator

Binomial name
- Calosoma peregrinator Guérin-Méneville, 1844

Synonyms
- Calosoma amplipenne Casey, 1913; Calosoma apacheanum Casey, 1913; Calosoma ingens Casey, 1913; Calosoma subgracile Casey, 1913; Calosoma carbonatum LeConte, 1862

= Calosoma peregrinator =

Species of beetle

Calosoma peregrinator, the traveling caterpillar hunter, is a species of ground beetle in the subfamily of Carabinae. It was described by Félix Édouard Guérin-Méneville in 1844. This species is found in Mexico and the southern United States, where it inhabits grasslands and pastures.

Adults overwinter in cavities in the ground and prey on caterpillars.
