= Calosoma parvicolle =

Scientific classification
- Domain: Eukaryota
- Kingdom: Animalia
- Phylum: Arthropoda
- Class: Insecta
- Order: Coleoptera
- Suborder: Adephaga
- Family: Carabidae
- Genus: Calosoma
- Species: C. parvicolle

Binomial name
- Calosoma parvicolle Fall, 1910

Synonyms
- Calosoma parvicollis; Calosoma pertinax Casey, 1920; Calosoma clemens Casey, 1914

Species of beetle

Calosoma parvicolle, the small-necked caterpillar hunter, is a species of ground beetle in the family Carabidae. This species is found in Mexico (Baja California, Sonora) and the United States (Arizona, California, New Mexico, Nevada, Utah), where it inhabits deserts and sand dunes.

Adults are nocturnal and diurnal, gregarious, and have been recorded preying on caterpillars, orthopterans and spiders.
