= Calosoma bastardi =

Scientific classification
- Kingdom: Animalia
- Phylum: Arthropoda
- Class: Insecta
- Order: Coleoptera
- Suborder: Adephaga
- Family: Carabidae
- Genus: Calosoma
- Species: C. bastardi

Binomial name
- Calosoma bastardi Alluaud, 1925

Species of beetle

Calosoma bastardi is a species of ground beetle in the subfamily of Carabinae. It was described by Alluaud in 1925. This species is found in south-eastern Madagascar.

Adults reach a length of 25-33 mm and have a bright blue, sometimes greenish colour.

== Etymology ==
The species is named for French naturalist and colonial administrator Eugène Joseph Bastard.
