= Calosoma arrowi =

Scientific classification
- Kingdom: Animalia
- Phylum: Arthropoda
- Class: Insecta
- Order: Coleoptera
- Suborder: Adephaga
- Family: Carabidae
- Genus: Calosoma
- Species: C. arrowi

Binomial name
- Calosoma arrowi Breuning, 1928

Synonyms
- Calosoma excellens Beheim & Breuning, 1943; Carabophanus gestroides Rougemont, 1976

Species of beetle

Calosoma arrowi is a species of ground beetle in the subfamily of Carabinae. It was described by Breuning in 1928. This species is found in Ethiopia.

Adults reach a length of 13-18 mm and are brachypterous. They are variable in colour, ranging from green with golden hues to cupreous, dark green or blue-black. However, there is always a series of black spots. Adults are mostly nocturnal.

== Etymology ==
The species is named for English entomologist Gilbert John Arrow.
