= Calosoma burtoni =

Scientific classification
- Domain: Eukaryota
- Kingdom: Animalia
- Phylum: Arthropoda
- Class: Insecta
- Order: Coleoptera
- Suborder: Adephaga
- Family: Carabidae
- Genus: Calosoma
- Species: C. burtoni

Binomial name
- Calosoma burtoni Alluaud, 1913

Species of beetle

Calosoma burtoni is a species of ground beetle in the subfamily of Carabinae. It was described by Alluaud in 1913. This species is found in northwestern Tanzania and Malawi.

Adults reach a length of 20-27 mm, have purplish-brown elytra and are brachypterous.

== Etymology ==
The species is named for British explorer Sir Richard Francis Burton.
