= Calosoma bulleri =

Scientific classification
- Kingdom: Animalia
- Phylum: Arthropoda
- Class: Insecta
- Order: Coleoptera
- Suborder: Adephaga
- Family: Carabidae
- Genus: Calosoma
- Species: C. bulleri

Binomial name
- Calosoma bulleri Beheim & Breuning, 1943

Species of beetle

Calosoma bulleri, Buller's caterpillar hunter, is a species of ground beetle in the subfamily of Carabinae. It was described by Beheim & Breuning in 1943. This species is found in Mexico (Jalisco), where it inhabits upland areas.

Adults are brachypterous.
