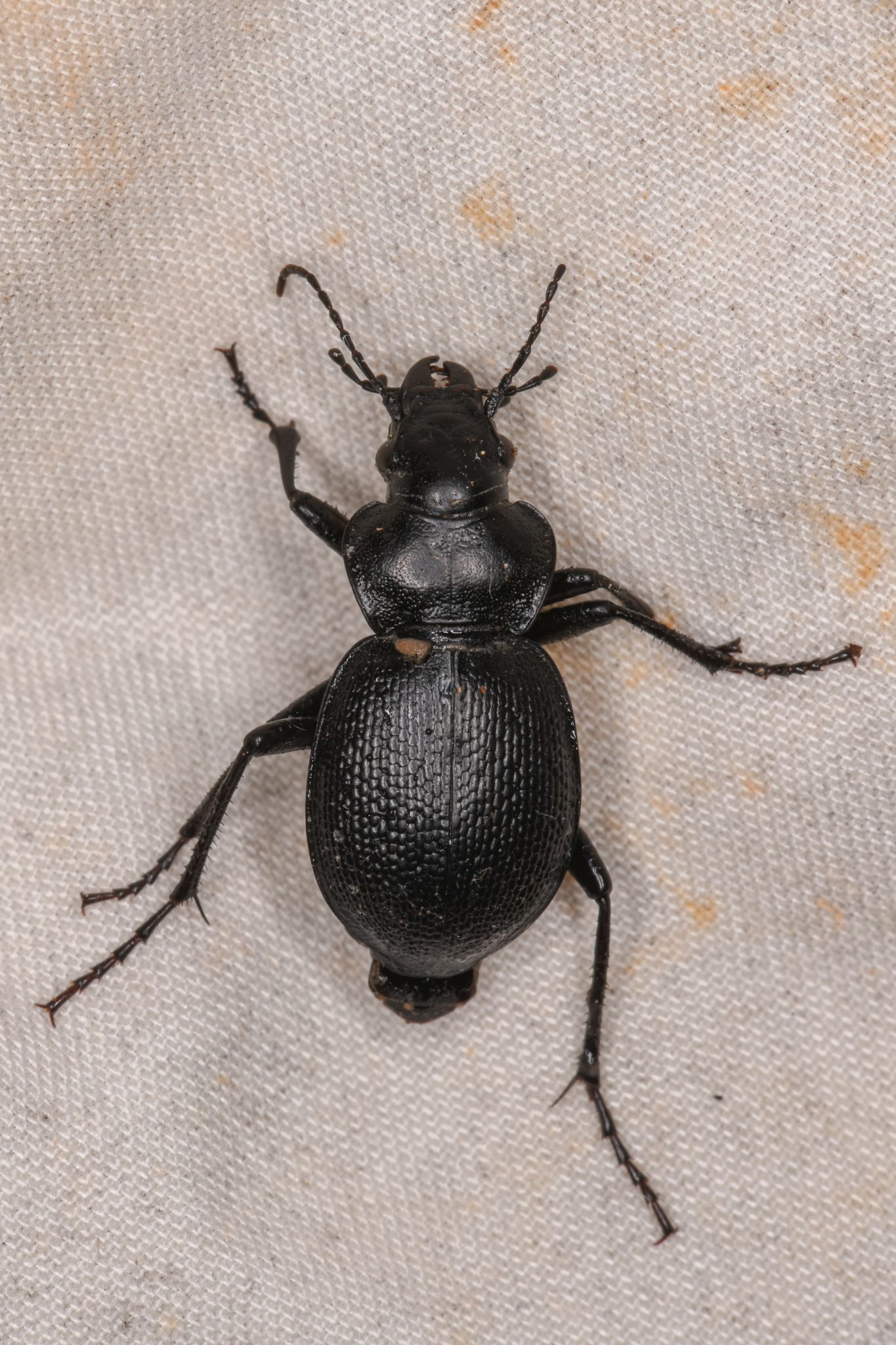
- Calosoma luxatum, Nevada

Scientific classification
- Kingdom: Animalia
- Phylum: Arthropoda
- Clade: Pancrustacea
- Class: Insecta
- Order: Coleoptera
- Suborder: Adephaga
- Family: Carabidae
- Genus: Calosoma
- Species: C. luxatum

Binomial name
- Calosoma luxatum Say, 1823

Synonyms
- Callisthenes luxatus; Calosoma luxatus Say, 1823; Callisthenes debilis Casey, 1920; Callisthenes parowanus Casey, 1920; Callisthenes reflexus Casey, 1920; Callisthenes semotus Casey, 1920; Callisthenes utensis Casey, 1920; Callisthenes diffractus Casey, 1913; Callisthenes exaratus Casey, 1913; Callisthenes pustulosus Casey, 1913; Callisthenes opacus Géhin, 1885; Callisthenes pimelioides F.Walker, 1866; Calosoma striatulum LeConte, 1859; Calosoma striatum Breuning, 1928; Calosoma tahoense Van Dyke, 1943; Callisthenes tegulatus Casey, 1913; Callisthenes viator Casey, 1913; Carabus zimmermani LeConte, 1847

= Calosoma luxatum =

Species of beetle

Calosoma luxatum, known sometimes as the dislocated beautiful black searcher, is a species in the beetle family Carabidae. It is found in the United States and Canada (Alberta, British Columbia, Saskatchewan, Arizona, California, Colorado, Idaho, Kansas, Montana, Nebraska, New Mexico, Nevada, Oregon, South Dakota, Utah, Washington, Wyoming), where it inhabits open short grass prairies and open ground in dry forests.

Adults are brachypterous.
