= Calosoma regelianum =

Scientific classification
- Domain: Eukaryota
- Kingdom: Animalia
- Phylum: Arthropoda
- Class: Insecta
- Order: Coleoptera
- Suborder: Adephaga
- Family: Carabidae
- Subfamily: Carabinae
- Tribe: Carabini
- Genus: Calosoma
- Species: C. regelianum

Binomial name
- Calosoma regelianum A.Morawitz, 1886

Synonyms
- Calosoma regelianus; Calosoma regelianum regelianum A.Morawitz, 1886; Callisthenes sediquii Ledoux, 1988; Calosoma ovale A.Morawitz, 1886; Calosoma oxygonum A.Morawitz, 1886

Species of beetle

Calosoma regelianum is a species of ground beetle in the family Carabidae. It is found in Tadzhikistan and Afghanistan.

== Subspecies ==
These two subspecies belong to the species Calosoma regelianum:

- Calosoma regelianum klapperichi Mandl, 1955 (Afghanistan)
- Calosoma regelianum regelianum A.Morawitz, 1886 (Tadzhikistan)
