= Calosoma viridissimum =

Scientific classification
- Domain: Eukaryota
- Kingdom: Animalia
- Phylum: Arthropoda
- Class: Insecta
- Order: Coleoptera
- Suborder: Adephaga
- Family: Carabidae
- Genus: Calosoma
- Species: C. viridissimum

Binomial name
- Calosoma viridissimum Haury, 1880

Species of beetle

Calosoma viridissimum, the greenish beautiful thickish searcher, is a species of ground beetle in the subfamily of Carabinae. It was described by Haury in 1880. This species is found in Mexico (Oaxaca), where it inhabits oak forests.

Adults are brachypterous.
