= Calosoma neumanni =

Scientific classification
- Domain: Eukaryota
- Kingdom: Animalia
- Phylum: Arthropoda
- Class: Insecta
- Order: Coleoptera
- Suborder: Adephaga
- Family: Carabidae
- Genus: Calosoma
- Species: C. neumanni

Binomial name
- Calosoma neumanni Kolbe, 1895

Synonyms
- Carabomorphus neumanni Kolbe, 1895; Orinodromus neumanni ufiomae Basilewsky, 1962

Species of beetle

Calosoma neumanni is a species of ground beetle in the subfamily of Carabinae. It was described by Kolbe in 1895. This species is found in Tanzania, where it is found on mount Hanang and mount Ufiomi (south-west of Mount Kilimanjaro).

Adults reach a length of 16-20 mm. They have a black body and reddish elytra, mostly with a light metal luster.

== Etymology ==
The species is named for German zoologist and ornithologist Oscar Rudolph Neumann.
