= Calosoma simplex =

Scientific classification
- Domain: Eukaryota
- Kingdom: Animalia
- Phylum: Arthropoda
- Class: Insecta
- Order: Coleoptera
- Suborder: Adephaga
- Family: Carabidae
- Genus: Calosoma
- Species: C. simplex

Binomial name
- Calosoma simplex LeConte, 1878

Species of beetle

Calosoma simplex, the simple beautiful black searcher, is a species of ground beetle in the subfamily Carabinae. It was described by John Lawrence LeConte in 1878. This species is found in Mexico, Arizona, California, Colorado, New Mexico and Texas.
