= Calosoma aethiopicum =

Scientific classification
- Kingdom: Animalia
- Phylum: Arthropoda
- Class: Insecta
- Order: Coleoptera
- Suborder: Adephaga
- Family: Carabidae
- Genus: Calosoma
- Species: C. aethiopicum

Binomial name
- Calosoma aethiopicum Breuning, 1928

Synonyms
- Carabops vermiculatus Straneo, 1942

Species of beetle

Calosoma aethiopicum is a species of ground beetle in the subfamily of Carabinae. It was described by Stephan von Breuning in 1928. This species is found in Ethiopia, where it is widespread throughout the Rift Valley.

Adults reach a length of 22-24 mm and are brachypterous.
