= Calosoma davidis =

Scientific classification
- Domain: Eukaryota
- Kingdom: Animalia
- Phylum: Arthropoda
- Class: Insecta
- Order: Coleoptera
- Suborder: Adephaga
- Family: Carabidae
- Subfamily: Carabinae
- Tribe: Carabini
- Genus: Calosoma
- Species: C. davidis

Binomial name
- Calosoma davidis Géhin, 1885

Synonyms
- Calosoma arrowianum Breuning, 1934; Calosoma (Caminara) martensi Paulus, 1971; Calosoma thibetanum Fairmaire, 1887

Species of beetle

Calosoma davidis is a species of ground beetle in the family Carabidae. It is found in western China, Nepal and northern Myanmar.

Adults reach a length of 22-28 mm.
