= Calosoma prominens =

Scientific classification
- Domain: Eukaryota
- Kingdom: Animalia
- Phylum: Arthropoda
- Class: Insecta
- Order: Coleoptera
- Suborder: Adephaga
- Family: Carabidae
- Genus: Calosoma
- Species: C. prominens

Binomial name
- Calosoma prominens LeConte, 1853

Synonyms
- Calosoma angulatum LeConte, 1852

Species of beetle

Calosoma prominens, the projecting caterpillar hunter, is a species of ground beetle in the subfamily Carabinae. It was described by John Lawrence LeConte in 1853. This species is found in Mexico (Baja California, Chihuahua, Durango, Sonora) and the United States (Arizona, California, New Mexico, Texas), where it inhabits acacia/cactus scrub areas.
