= Calosoma oregonus =

Scientific classification
- Domain: Eukaryota
- Kingdom: Animalia
- Phylum: Arthropoda
- Class: Insecta
- Order: Coleoptera
- Suborder: Adephaga
- Family: Carabidae
- Genus: Calosoma
- Species: C. oregonus

Binomial name
- Calosoma oregonus Gidaspow, 1959

Species of beetle

Calosoma oregonus, the Oregon beautiful black searcher, is a species of ground beetle in the subfamily of Carabinae. It was described by Gidaspow in 1959. This species is found in Oregon.

Adults are brachypterous.
