= Calosoma beesoni =

Scientific classification
- Kingdom: Animalia
- Phylum: Arthropoda
- Class: Insecta
- Order: Coleoptera
- Suborder: Adephaga
- Family: Carabidae
- Genus: Calosoma
- Species: C. beesoni

Binomial name
- Calosoma beesoni Andrewes, 1919

Synonyms
- Calosoma (Calosoma) himalayanum Lorenz 2005

Species of beetle

Calosoma beesoni is a species of beetle of the Carabidae family. This species is found in north-eastern India and Pakistan.

Adults reach a length of 24–25 mm and have a black body with a bronze or sometimes bluish lustre. The species preys on Ectropis deodarae.

== Etymology ==
This species is named for English entomologist Cyril Frederick Cherrington Beeson.
