= Calosoma nyassicum =

Scientific classification
- Domain: Eukaryota
- Kingdom: Animalia
- Phylum: Arthropoda
- Class: Insecta
- Order: Coleoptera
- Suborder: Adephaga
- Family: Carabidae
- Genus: Calosoma
- Species: C. nyassicum

Binomial name
- Calosoma nyassicum Basilewsky, 1984

Synonyms
- Carabops nyassicus Basilewsky, 1984

Species of beetle

Calosoma nyassicum is a species of ground beetle in the subfamily of Carabinae. It was described by Pierre Basilewsky in 1984 and is endemic to Nyika Plateau, Malawi where it is found on elevation of 2,300–2,400 metres (7,500–7,900 ft). The species is black coloured and is 24–25 millimetres (0.94–0.98 in) long. It have traverse prothorax with rounded sides which is also wrinkled like its head.
