= Calosoma vagans =

Scientific classification
- Domain: Eukaryota
- Kingdom: Animalia
- Phylum: Arthropoda
- Class: Insecta
- Order: Coleoptera
- Suborder: Adephaga
- Family: Carabidae
- Genus: Calosoma
- Species: C. vagans

Binomial name
- Calosoma vagans Dejean, 1831

Species of beetle

Calosoma vagans, the roaming caterpillar hunter, is a species of ground beetle in the subfamily of Carabinae. It was described by Pierre François Marie Auguste Dejean. This species is found in Argentina, Chile and Peru, where it inhabits areas with cold winters.

Adults are nocturnal.
