= Calosoma laevigatum =

Scientific classification
- Domain: Eukaryota
- Kingdom: Animalia
- Phylum: Arthropoda
- Class: Insecta
- Order: Coleoptera
- Suborder: Adephaga
- Family: Carabidae
- Genus: Calosoma
- Species: C. laevigatum

Binomial name
- Calosoma laevigatum Chaudoir, 1869

Species of beetle

Calosoma laevigatum, Hoge's smooth caterpillar hunter, is a species of ground beetle in the subfamily of Carabinae. It was described by Maximilien Chaudoir in 1869. This species is found in Mexico (Durango, Guanajuato, Hidalgo, México, Puebla, Veracruz), where it inhabits meadows on mountains.

Adults are brachypterous.
