= Calosoma orientale =

Scientific classification
- Domain: Eukaryota
- Kingdom: Animalia
- Phylum: Arthropoda
- Class: Insecta
- Order: Coleoptera
- Suborder: Adephaga
- Family: Carabidae
- Genus: Calosoma
- Species: C. orientale

Binomial name
- Calosoma orientale Hope, 1838

Synonyms
- Calosoma squamigerum Chaudoir, 1869

Species of beetle

Calosoma orientale is a species of ground beetle in the subfamily of Carabinae. It was described by Hope in 1838. This species is found in China (from Tibet and Yunnan to Hainan), Pakistan, India and Sri Lanka.

Adults reach a length of 25-26 mm and have a dull black body, sometimes with a metallic luster at the borders.
