= Calosoma guineense =

Scientific classification
- Domain: Eukaryota
- Kingdom: Animalia
- Phylum: Arthropoda
- Class: Insecta
- Order: Coleoptera
- Suborder: Adephaga
- Family: Carabidae
- Genus: Calosoma
- Species: C. guineense

Binomial name
- Calosoma guineense Imhoff, 1843

Synonyms
- Calosoma colmanti Burgeon, 1928

Species of beetle

Calosoma guineense is a species of ground beetle in the subfamily of Carabinae. It was described by Imhoff in 1843. This species is found in Ivory Coast, Ghana, Togo, Nigeria and DR Congo.

Adults reach a length of 22-26 mm and have a bronze-purple colour.
