= Calosoma bridgesi =

Scientific classification
- Kingdom: Animalia
- Phylum: Arthropoda
- Class: Insecta
- Order: Coleoptera
- Suborder: Adephaga
- Family: Carabidae
- Genus: Calosoma
- Species: C. bridgesi

Binomial name
- Calosoma bridgesi Chaudoir, 1869

Species of beetle

Calosoma bridgesi, Bridges' caterpillar hunter, is a brachypterous species of ground beetle in the subfamily of Carabinae. The species is 18–20 millimetres (0.71–0.79 in), is reddish-black coloured, and is endemic to the Andes mountains of Bolivia, Argentina, and Chile where it is found on elevation of 3,500 metres (11,500 ft). It flies in January and February.

== History ==
It was originally described by Maximilien Chaudoir in 1869. In 1927 Stephan von Breuning placed C. bridgesi into subgenus Neocalosoma, which was later accepted by Jeannel but only as a subgenus of genus Castrida. In 1963, Boris Gidaspov moved C. bridgesi to subgenus Blaptosoma of genus Callitropa. Following that move Jeannel placed the species into genus Castrida and by 1968 it was placed into subgenus Microcalosoma by Basilewsky.
