= Calosoma subaeneum =

Scientific classification
- Domain: Eukaryota
- Kingdom: Animalia
- Phylum: Arthropoda
- Class: Insecta
- Order: Coleoptera
- Suborder: Adephaga
- Family: Carabidae
- Genus: Calosoma
- Species: C. subaeneum

Binomial name
- Calosoma subaeneum Chaudoir, 1869

Species of beetle

Calosoma subaeneum, the coppery beautiful black searcher, is a species of ground beetle in the subfamily of Carabinae. It was described by Maximilien Chaudoir in 1869. This species is found in British Columbia, California, Idaho and Washington, where it inhabits lowland areas.

Adults are brachypterous.
