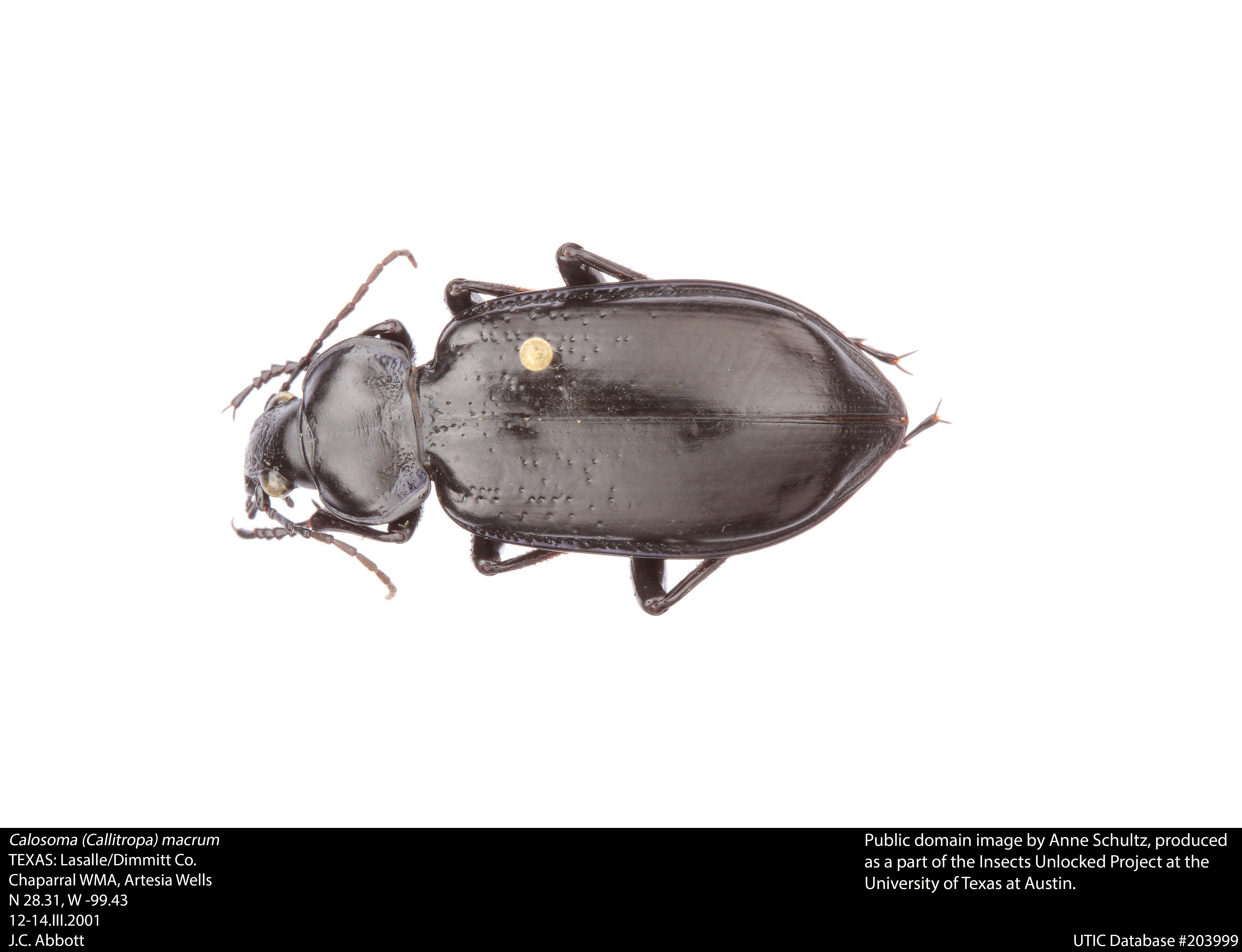

Scientific classification
- Kingdom: Animalia
- Phylum: Arthropoda
- Class: Insecta
- Order: Coleoptera
- Suborder: Adephaga
- Family: Carabidae
- Genus: Calosoma
- Species: C. macrum

Binomial name
- Calosoma macrum LeConte, 1853

Synonyms
- Calosoma macrum LeConte, 1853; Calosoma macrum Breuning, 1928; Callitropa macra Lapouge, 1932; Callitropa macrum Jeannel, 1940; Calosoma macrum Gidaspow, 1959; Calosoma macra Erwin, 2007

= Calosoma macrum =

Species of beetle

Calosoma macrum, the long caterpillar hunter, is a species of ground beetle in the subfamily Carabinae. It was described by John Lawrence LeConte in 1853. This species is found in Mexico (Coahuila, Tamaulipas) and the United States (Arizona, Louisiana, New Mexico, Oklahoma, Texas), where it inhabits mid altitude open areas.

The species is 24–30 millimetres (0.94–1.18 in) long, black, and lives at an elevation of 1,000 to 1,600 metres (3,300 to 5,200 ft).
