= Calosoma fabulosum =

Scientific classification
- Kingdom: Animalia
- Phylum: Arthropoda
- Class: Insecta
- Order: Coleoptera
- Suborder: Adephaga
- Family: Carabidae
- Genus: Calosoma
- Species: C. fabulosum

Binomial name
- Calosoma fabulosum Semenov & Znojko, 1933

Species of beetle

Calosoma fabulosum is a species of beetle of the Carabidae family. This species is found in central eastern Afghanistan.

Adults reach a length of 26-28 mm, are brachypterous and have a reddish-brown colour.
