= Calosoma masaicum =

Scientific classification
- Domain: Eukaryota
- Kingdom: Animalia
- Phylum: Arthropoda
- Class: Insecta
- Order: Coleoptera
- Suborder: Adephaga
- Family: Carabidae
- Subfamily: Carabinae
- Tribe: Carabini
- Genus: Calosoma
- Species: C. masaicum

Binomial name
- Calosoma masaicum (Alluaud, 1912)

Synonyms
- Carabomorphus masaicus Alluaud, 1912; Carabomorphus cherangani Jeannel, 1940; Carabomorphus jeanneli Alluaud, 1912; Carabomorphus alluaudi Jeannel, 1912; Carabomorphus chappuisi Jeannel, 1940; Calosoma pseudocatenatum Breuning, 1934; Carabomorphus alternans Jeannel, 1940; Carabomorphus joannae Alluaud, 1912

Species of beetle

Calosoma masaicum is a species in the beetle family Carabidae. It is found in Kenya.

== Subspecies ==
These three subspecies belong to the species Calosoma masaicum:

- Calosoma masaicum cherangani (Jeannel, 1940) (Kenya)
- Calosoma masaicum jeanneli (Alluaud, 1912) (Kenya)
- Calosoma masaicum masaicum (Alluaud, 1912) (Kenya)
