= Calosoma cyaneoventre =

Scientific classification
- Kingdom: Animalia
- Phylum: Arthropoda
- Clade: Pancrustacea
- Class: Insecta
- Order: Coleoptera
- Suborder: Adephaga
- Family: Carabidae
- Genus: Calosoma
- Species: C. cyaneoventre

Binomial name
- Calosoma cyaneoventre Mandl, 1995

Species of beetle

Calosoma cyaneoventre is a species of ground beetle in the subfamily of Carabinae. It was described by Mandl in 1995. This species is found in Australia.
