= Calosoma anthracinum =

Scientific classification
- Kingdom: Animalia
- Phylum: Arthropoda
- Class: Insecta
- Order: Coleoptera
- Suborder: Adephaga
- Family: Carabidae
- Genus: Calosoma
- Species: C. anthracinum

Binomial name
- Calosoma anthracinum Dejean, 1831

Synonyms
- Blaptosoma rufinum Géhin, 1885

Species of beetle

Calosoma anthracinum is a species of ground beetle in the subfamily of Carabinae. It was described by Pierre François Marie Auguste Dejean in 1831. This species is found in Mexico.

== Subspecies ==
- Calosoma anthracinum anthracinum (Guerrero) - black caterpillar hunter
- Calosoma anthracinum microgonum Bates, 1891 (Distrito Federal, Jalisco, Puebla, Veracruz) - small-angled caterpillar hunter
