= Calosoma algiricum =

Scientific classification
- Kingdom: Animalia
- Phylum: Arthropoda
- Class: Insecta
- Order: Coleoptera
- Suborder: Adephaga
- Family: Carabidae
- Genus: Calosoma
- Species: C. algiricum

Binomial name
- Calosoma algiricum Gehin, 1885

Synonyms
- Calosoma petri Semenov, 1902

Species of beetle

Calosoma algiricum is a species of ground beetle in the subfamily of Carabinae. This species is found in Italy, Albania, Greece, Morocco, Tunisia, Libya, Israel/Palestine, Jordan, Syria, Iraq, Saudi Arabia, Yemen, Iran, on the Canary Islands and in Turkmenistan It was described by Gehin in 1885., where it inhabits arid or sub-desert areas, especially oases.

Adults reach a length of 30–35 mm and they are black. They prey on the larvae of moths and locusts.
