= Calosoma olivieri =

Scientific classification
- Kingdom: Animalia
- Phylum: Arthropoda
- Class: Insecta
- Order: Coleoptera
- Suborder: Adephaga
- Family: Carabidae
- Genus: Calosoma
- Species: C. olivieri

Binomial name
- Calosoma olivieri Dejean, 1831

Synonyms
- Calosoma azoricum Heer, 1860

Species of beetle

Calosoma olivieri is a species of ground beetle in the subfamily of Carabinae. It was described by Pierre François Marie Auguste Dejean in 1831. This species is found in Spain, Italy, Morocco, Algeria, Tunisia, Libya, Egypt, Israel/Palestine, Jordan, Lebanon, Syria, Turkey, Iraq, Saudi Arabia, Arab Emirates, Oman, Iran, Azores, Canary Islands, Uzbekistan, Turkmenistan, Afghanistan, Cape Verde, Mauretania, Chad, Pakistan and India.

Adults reach a length of 20-28 mm.

== Etymology ==
The species is named for French entomologist and botanist Guillaume-Antoine Olivier.
