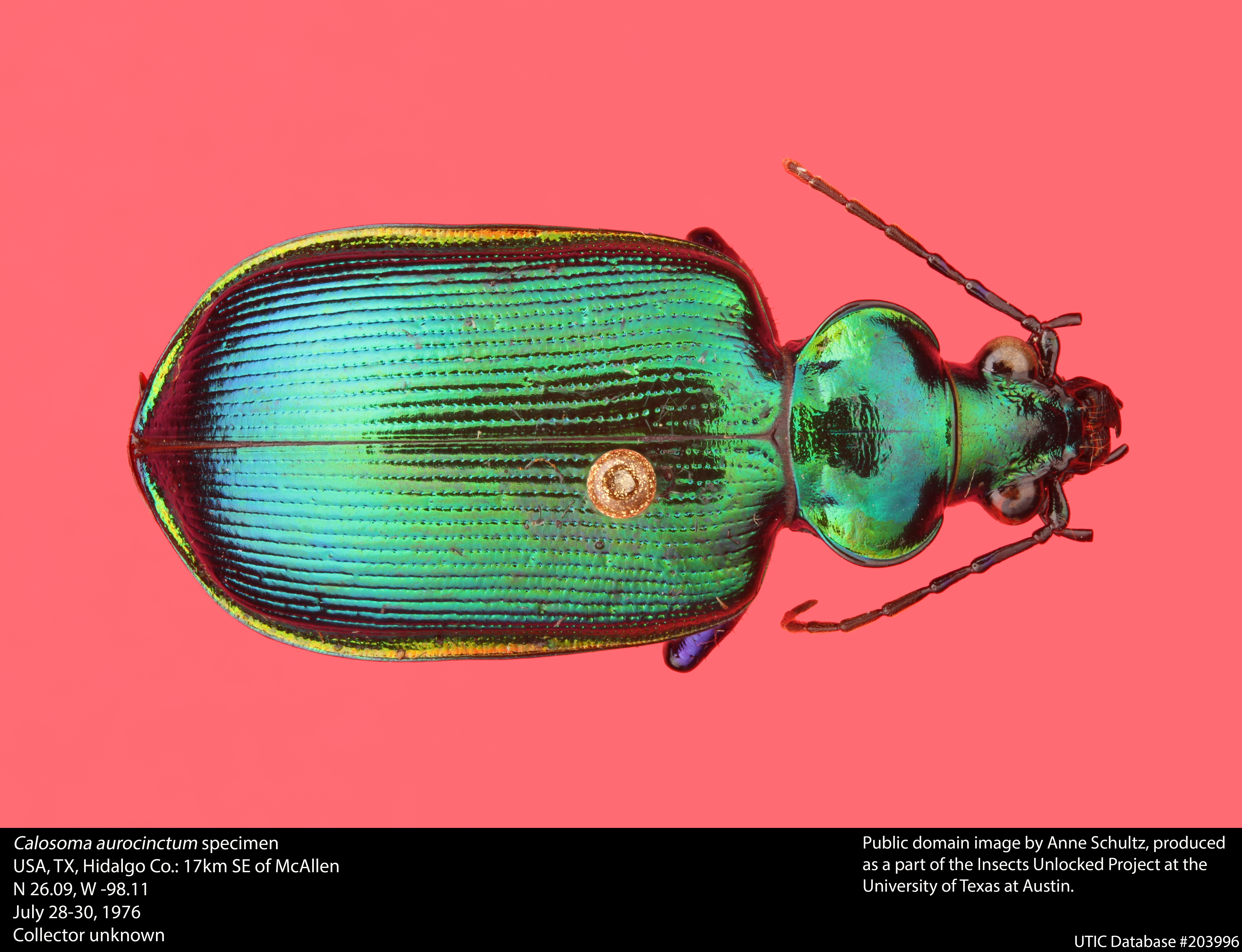

Scientific classification
- Domain: Eukaryota
- Kingdom: Animalia
- Phylum: Arthropoda
- Class: Insecta
- Order: Coleoptera
- Suborder: Adephaga
- Family: Carabidae
- Genus: Calosoma
- Species: C. aurocinctum

Binomial name
- Calosoma aurocinctum Chaudoir, 1950

Synonyms
- Calosoma splendidum Perbosc, 1839

= Calosoma aurocinctum =

Species of beetle

Calosoma aurocinctum, the gold-ringed caterpillar hunter, is a species of ground beetle in the subfamily of Carabinae. It was described by Maximilien Chaudoir in 1950. This species is found in Guatemala, Mexico, Nicaragua and Texas, where it inhabits lowland to midland areas.
