= Calosoma chihuahua =

Scientific classification
- Domain: Eukaryota
- Kingdom: Animalia
- Phylum: Arthropoda
- Class: Insecta
- Order: Coleoptera
- Suborder: Adephaga
- Family: Carabidae
- Genus: Calosoma
- Species: C. chihuahua

Binomial name
- Calosoma chihuahua Gidaspow, 1959

Species of beetle

Calosoma chihuahua, the Chihuahua caterpillar hunter, is a species of ground beetle in the subfamily of Carabinae. It was described by Gidaspow in 1959. This species is found in Mexico (Chihuahua), where it inhabits meadows and lake margins in pine-oak woodlands.

Adults are brachypterous.
