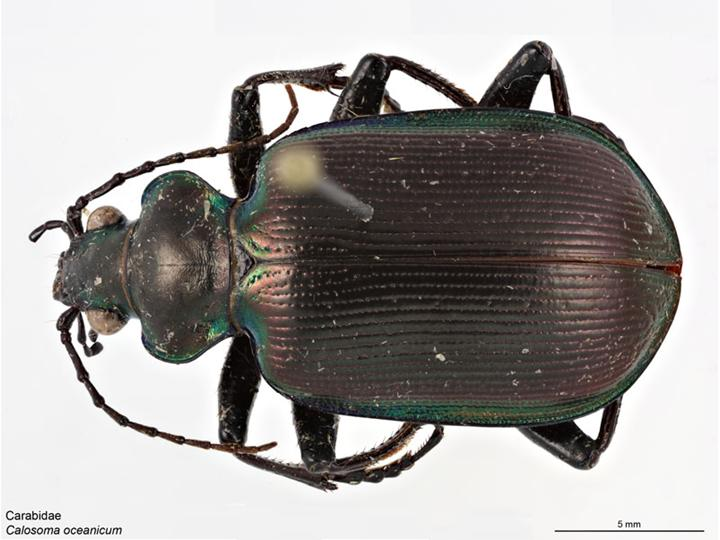

Scientific classification
- Domain: Eukaryota
- Kingdom: Animalia
- Phylum: Arthropoda
- Class: Insecta
- Order: Coleoptera
- Suborder: Adephaga
- Family: Carabidae
- Genus: Calosoma
- Species: C. oceanicum

Binomial name
- Calosoma oceanicum Perroud & Montrouzier, 1864

Synonyms
- Calosoma lombocense Häckel, Farkac & Sehnal, 2004; Calosoma walkeri C.O.Waterhouse, 1898; Calosoma timorense Chaudoir, 1869

= Calosoma oceanicum =

Species of beetle

Calosoma oceanicum is a species of ground beetle in the subfamily of Carabinae. It was described by Perroud & Montrouzier in 1864. This species is found in Indonesia and Australia.

== Subspecies ==
- Calosoma oceanicum oceanicum (Indonesia, Australia)
- Calosoma oceanicum klynstrai Breuning, 1927 (Indonesia)
