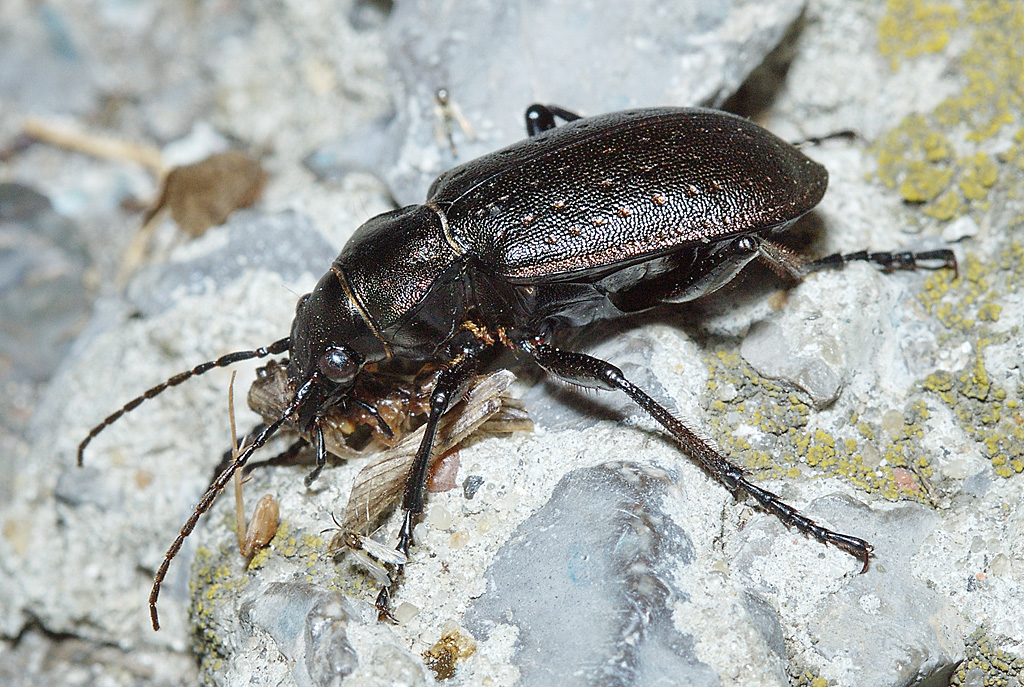

Scientific classification
- Kingdom: Animalia
- Phylum: Arthropoda
- Clade: Pancrustacea
- Class: Insecta
- Order: Coleoptera
- Suborder: Adephaga
- Family: Carabidae
- Genus: Calosoma
- Species: C. investigator

Binomial name
- Calosoma investigator (Illiger, 1798)

Synonyms
- Carabus investigator Illiger, 1798; Calosoma chaffanjoni Lapouge, 1930; Calosoma dauricum Motschulsky, 1844; Calosoma sibiricum Motschulsky, 1844; Calosoma leptophyum Fischer von Waldheim, 1828; Calosoma russicum Fischer von Waldheim, 1828; Calosoma caspium Dejean, 1826; Calosoma sericeum Sturm, 1815

= Calosoma investigator =

Species of beetle

Calosoma investigator is a species of ground beetle belonging to the genus Calosoma and the subgenus Charmosta. The species is diffused in North-Eastern Europe and Siberia.
