= Calosoma persianum =

Scientific classification
- Domain: Eukaryota
- Kingdom: Animalia
- Phylum: Arthropoda
- Class: Insecta
- Order: Coleoptera
- Suborder: Adephaga
- Family: Carabidae
- Genus: Calosoma
- Species: C. persianum

Binomial name
- Calosoma persianum (Morvan, 1974)

Synonyms
- Callitropa persiana Morvan, 1974

Species of beetle

Calosoma persianum is a species of ground beetle in the subfamily of Carabinae. It was described by Morvan in 1974. Subsequent to the description given, no further findings were reported in literature. The original description depicts the beetle as being comparable to the Mexican Callitropa (Blaptosoma) laeve, with which it has a superficial resemblance. However, further investigations have led researchers to believe it belongs to subgenus Callisthenes. The species is found in Iran.

Adults reach a length of 26-30 mm, are brachypterous and have a black colour.
