= Calosoma antinorii =

Scientific classification
- Domain: Eukaryota
- Kingdom: Animalia
- Phylum: Arthropoda
- Class: Insecta
- Order: Coleoptera
- Suborder: Adephaga
- Family: Carabidae
- Genus: Calosoma
- Species: C. antinorii

Binomial name
- Calosoma antinorii Gestro, 1878

Species of beetle

Calosoma antinorii is a species of ground beetle in the subfamily of Carabinae. It was described by Gestro in 1878. This species is found in Ethiopia.

Adults reach a length of 15-18 mm and are blackish with greenish reflexes and a yellow band on each elytron. They are brachypterous and mostly nocturnal. On the width of these bands are noticeable a number of slightly darker spots, aligned along the striae. The undyed parties of the elytron are perfectly smooth and uniform.

== Etymology ==
The species is named for Italian explorer Orazio Antinori.
