= Calosoma schaefferi =

Scientific classification
- Kingdom: Animalia
- Phylum: Arthropoda
- Class: Insecta
- Order: Coleoptera
- Suborder: Adephaga
- Family: Carabidae
- Genus: Calosoma
- Species: C. schaefferi

Binomial name
- Calosoma schaefferi Breuning, 1928

Synonyms
- Callisthenes schaefferi; Calosoma irregulare Schaeffer, 1915; Calosoma discors schaefferi; Calosoma striatius Hatch, 1953

Species of beetle

Calosoma schaefferi, the Schaeffer's beautiful black searcher, is a species of beetle of the Carabidae family. This species is found in California and Oregon, where it inhabits damp meadows.

Adults are brachypterous.
