= Calosoma alinderi =

Scientific classification
- Kingdom: Animalia
- Phylum: Arthropoda
- Class: Insecta
- Order: Coleoptera
- Suborder: Adephaga
- Family: Carabidae
- Genus: Calosoma
- Species: C. alinderi

Binomial name
- Calosoma alinderi (Breuning, 1928)

Synonyms
- Orinodromus malleatus Jeannel, 1940

Species of beetle

Calosoma alinderi is a species of ground beetle in the subfamily of Carabinae. It was described by Breuning in 1928. This species is found in Uganda and Kenya.
