= Calosoma deckeni =

Scientific classification
- Domain: Eukaryota
- Kingdom: Animalia
- Phylum: Arthropoda
- Class: Insecta
- Order: Coleoptera
- Suborder: Adephaga
- Family: Carabidae
- Genus: Calosoma
- Species: C. deckeni

Binomial name
- Calosoma deckeni (Gerstaecker, 1867)

Synonyms
- Carabus deckeni Gerstaecker, 1867; Orinodromus alluaudae Alluaud, 1908; Orinodromus alluaudi Kolbe, 1905; Orinodromus gerstaeckeri Kolbe, 1895; Orinodromus nigripennis Kolbe, 1895

Species of beetle

Calosoma deckeni is a species of ground beetle in the subfamily of Carabinae. It was described by Gersteacker. This species is found in Tanzania, where it inhabits the south-eastern slopes of Mount Kilimanjaro.

Adults reach a length of 12-18 mm. They have a reddish yellow pronotum and black to brown to yellow elytra.

== Etymology ==
The species is named for German explorer Baron Karl Klaus von der Decken.
