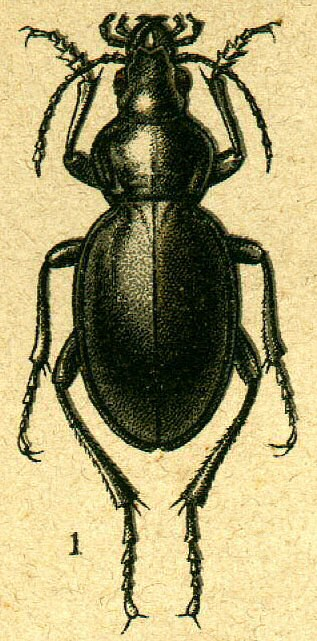

Scientific classification
- Domain: Eukaryota
- Kingdom: Animalia
- Phylum: Arthropoda
- Class: Insecta
- Order: Coleoptera
- Suborder: Adephaga
- Family: Carabidae
- Genus: Calosoma
- Species: C. usgentense

Binomial name
- Calosoma usgentense Solsky, 1874

Synonyms
- Calosoma usgentensis Solsky, 1874; Calosoma alaiense Mandl, 1967; Calosoma ferganense Häckel, 2013; Callisthenes karaalmensis Obydov, 1999; Callisthenes rugiceps Kraatz, 1884

= Calosoma usgentense =

Species of beetle

Calosoma usgentense is a species in the beetle family Carabidae. It is found in Uzbekistan and Kyrgyzstan.

== Subspecies ==
These two subspecies belong to the species Calosoma usgentense:

- Calosoma usgentense mandli Bruschi, 2013 (Uzbekistan)
- Calosoma usgentense usgentense Solsky, 1874 (Uzbekistan and Kyrgyzstan)
