= Calosoma dawsoni =

Scientific classification
- Domain: Eukaryota
- Kingdom: Animalia
- Phylum: Arthropoda
- Class: Insecta
- Order: Coleoptera
- Suborder: Adephaga
- Family: Carabidae
- Genus: Calosoma
- Species: C. dawsoni

Binomial name
- Calosoma dawsoni (Dajoz, 1997)

Synonyms
- Callisthenes dawsoni Dajoz, 1997

Species of beetle

Calosoma dawsoni, Dawson's beautiful black searcher, is a species of ground beetle in the subfamily Carabinae. It was described by Dajoz in 1997. It is found near Big Alkali Lake in California.

Adults are brachypterous and prey on caterpillars.
