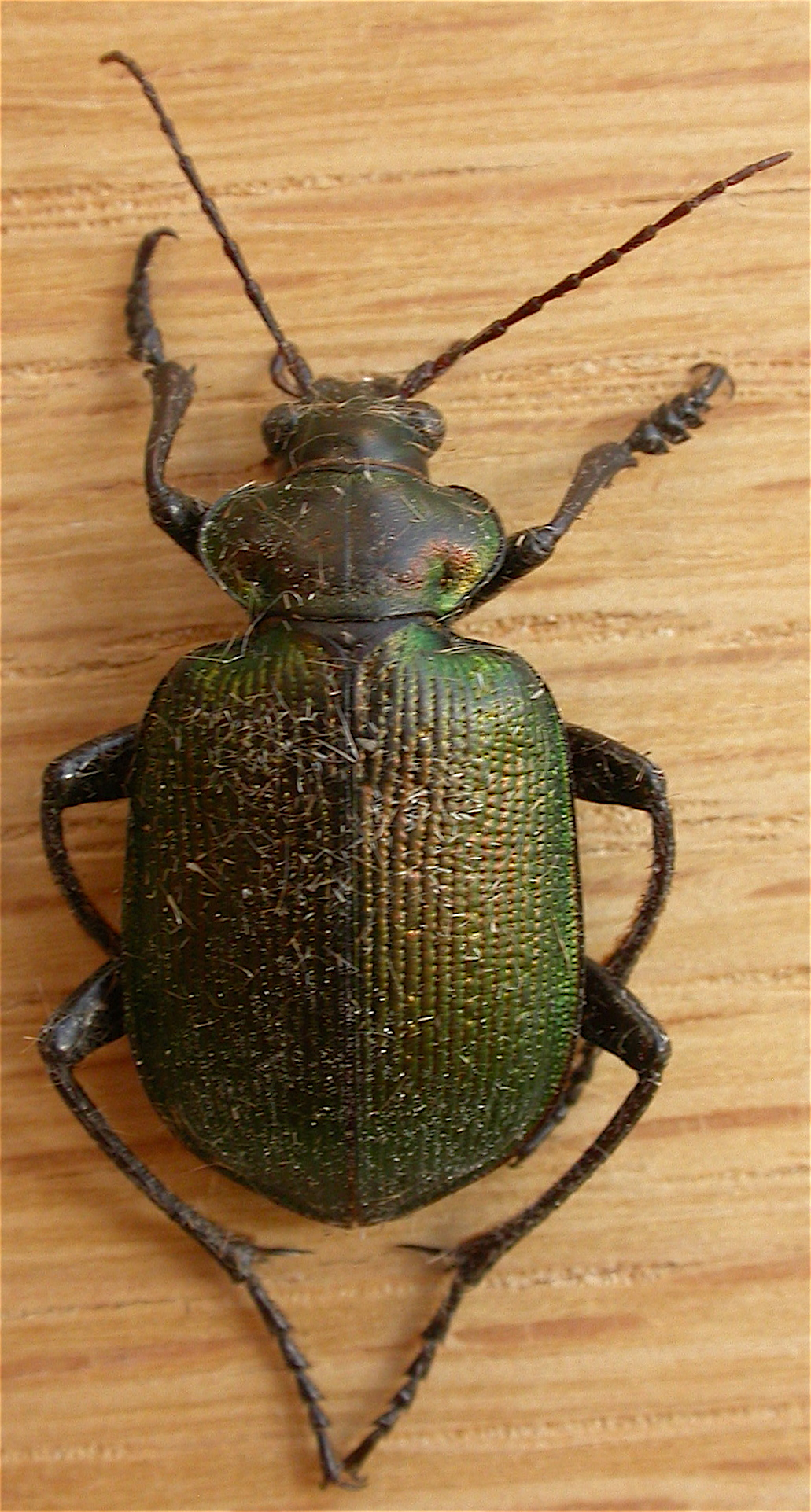
- Dorsal view
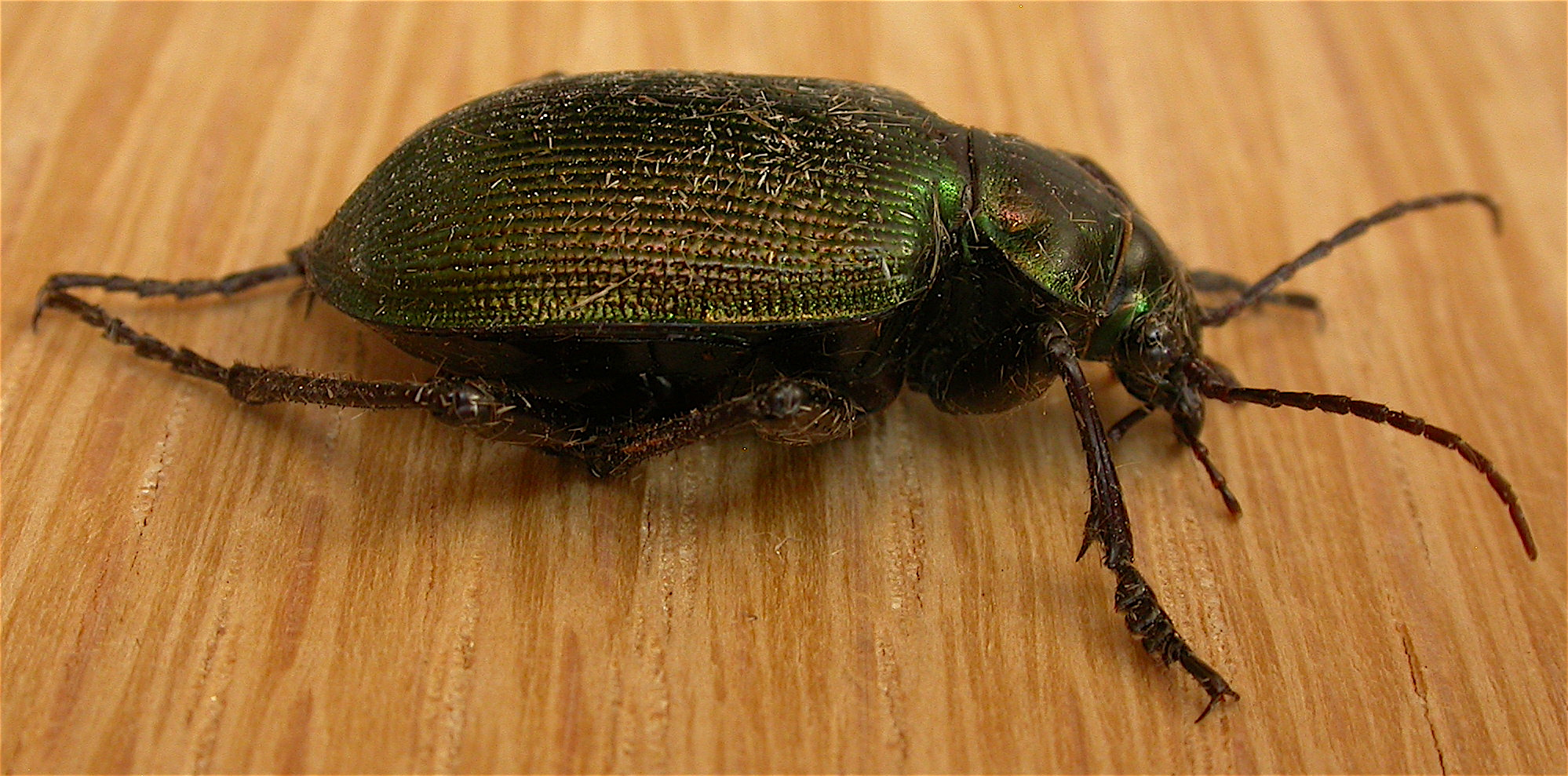
- Ventral view

Scientific classification
- Kingdom: Animalia
- Phylum: Arthropoda
- Class: Insecta
- Order: Coleoptera
- Suborder: Adephaga
- Family: Carabidae
- Genus: Calosoma
- Species: C. schayeri

Binomial name
- Calosoma schayeri Erichson, 1842

Synonyms
- Calosoma grandipenne Lapouge, 1868; Calosoma curtisi Hope, 1845

= Calosoma schayeri =

Species of beetle

Calosoma schayeri (green carab beetle or saffron beetle) is a species of Carabidae that occurs in Australia. Like most Carabidae the larvae are predaceous. It is quite active at night when it is found hunting for slow-moving prey such as caterpillars. If handled it gives off an unpleasant scent.
