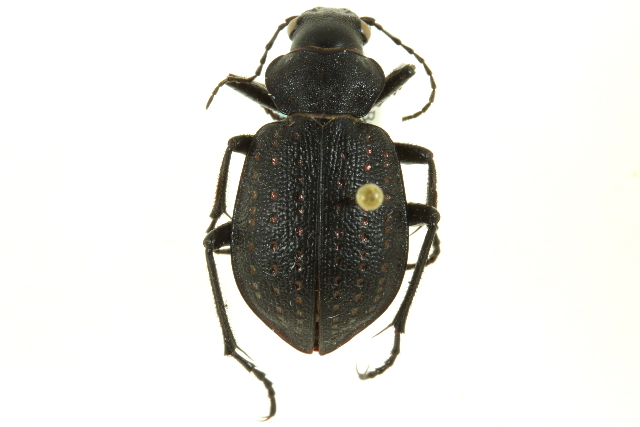

Scientific classification
- Kingdom: Animalia
- Phylum: Arthropoda
- Class: Insecta
- Order: Coleoptera
- Suborder: Adephaga
- Family: Carabidae
- Genus: Calosoma
- Species: C. tepidum

Binomial name
- Calosoma tepidum LeConte, 1851

Synonyms
- Calosoma caelator Casey, 1913; Calosoma cogitans Casey, 1920; Calosoma indigens Casey, 1913; Calosoma irregulare F.Walker, 1866; Calosoma pellax Casey, 1920; Calosoma semicupreum Casey, 1920

= Calosoma tepidum =

Species of beetle

Calosoma tepidum, known as the lukewarm beautiful black searcher, is a species of ground beetle in the subfamily Carabinae. It was first described by John Lawrence LeConte in 1851. This species is found in British Columbia, Arizona, California, Colorado, Idaho, Montana, North Dakota, Nebraska, Nevada, Oregon, Utah, Washington and Wyoming, where it inhabits areas with open dry ground and sparse low vegetation.

Adult prey on caterpillars and grasshoppers.
