= Calosoma trapezipenne =

Scientific classification
- Domain: Eukaryota
- Kingdom: Animalia
- Phylum: Arthropoda
- Class: Insecta
- Order: Coleoptera
- Suborder: Adephaga
- Family: Carabidae
- Genus: Calosoma
- Species: C. trapezipenne

Binomial name
- Calosoma trapezipenne Chaudoir, 1869

Species of beetle

Calosoma trapezipenne, the dim-winged caterpillar hunter, is a species of ground beetle in the subfamily of Carabinae. It was described by Maximilien Chaudoir in 1869. This species is found in Argentina, where it is found on the western plateau and the uplands of Mendoza and San Juan Provinces. Its habitat consists of xerophyte forests and bare hills.
