= Calosoma grandidieri =

Scientific classification
- Domain: Eukaryota
- Kingdom: Animalia
- Phylum: Arthropoda
- Class: Insecta
- Order: Coleoptera
- Suborder: Adephaga
- Family: Carabidae
- Genus: Calosoma
- Species: C. grandidieri

Binomial name
- Calosoma grandidieri Maindron, 1900

Species of beetle

Calosoma grandidieri is a species of ground beetle in the subfamily of Carabinae. It was described by Maindron in 1900. This species is found in Madagascar.

Adults reach a length of 25-35 mm and have a bronzed colour.

== Etymology ==
The species is named for French naturalist and explorer Alfred Grandidier.
