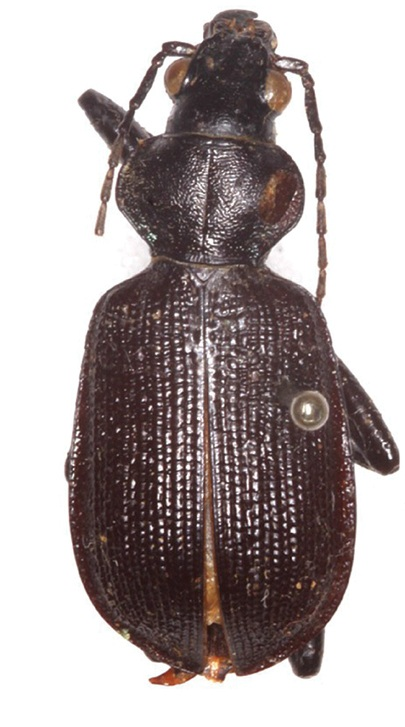

Scientific classification
- Domain: Eukaryota
- Kingdom: Animalia
- Phylum: Arthropoda
- Class: Insecta
- Order: Coleoptera
- Suborder: Adephaga
- Family: Carabidae
- Subfamily: Carabinae
- Tribe: Carabini
- Genus: Calosoma
- Species: C. scabrosum

Binomial name
- Calosoma scabrosum Chaudoir, 1843

Synonyms
- Calosoma jakli Haeckel, Farkac & Sehnal, 2005

= Calosoma scabrosum =

Species of beetle

Calosoma scabrosum is a species of ground beetle in the family Carabidae. It is found in Africa and the Middle East (Oman, Yemen, Mauretania, Niger, Chad, Sudan, Djibouti, Somalia)

Adults reach a length of 17-26 mm and have a black colour with a faint bronze-green sheen.
