= Calosoma elgonense =

Scientific classification
- Kingdom: Animalia
- Phylum: Arthropoda
- Class: Insecta
- Order: Coleoptera
- Suborder: Adephaga
- Family: Carabidae
- Genus: Calosoma
- Species: C. elgonense

Binomial name
- Calosoma elgonense Burgeon, 1928

Synonyms
- Carabomorphus (Elgonorites) elgonensis Burgeon, 1928

Species of beetle

Calosoma elgonense is a species of ground beetle in the subfamily of Carabinae. It was described by Burgeon in 1928. This species is found in Uganda and Kenya, where it is found on Mount Elgon.

Adults reach a length of 10-16 mm.
