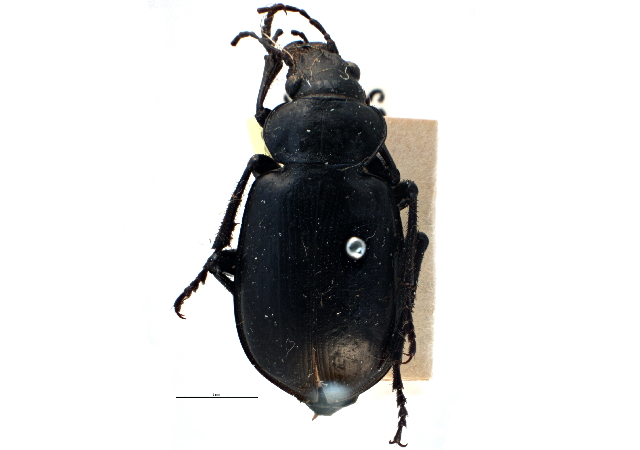

Scientific classification
- Kingdom: Animalia
- Phylum: Arthropoda
- Class: Insecta
- Order: Coleoptera
- Suborder: Adephaga
- Family: Carabidae
- Subfamily: Carabinae
- Tribe: Carabini
- Genus: Calosoma
- Species: C. morrisonii

Binomial name
- Calosoma morrisonii G.Horn, 1885

Synonyms
- Calosoma morrisoni; Calosoma mexicanum Géhin, 1885

= Calosoma morrisonii =

Species of beetle

Calosoma morrisonii, Morrison's beautiful black searcher, is a species in the beetle family Carabidae. It is found in the United States (California, Colorado, New Mexico, Nevada) and Mexico (Durango), where it inhabits areas with open dry ground and sand dunes.
