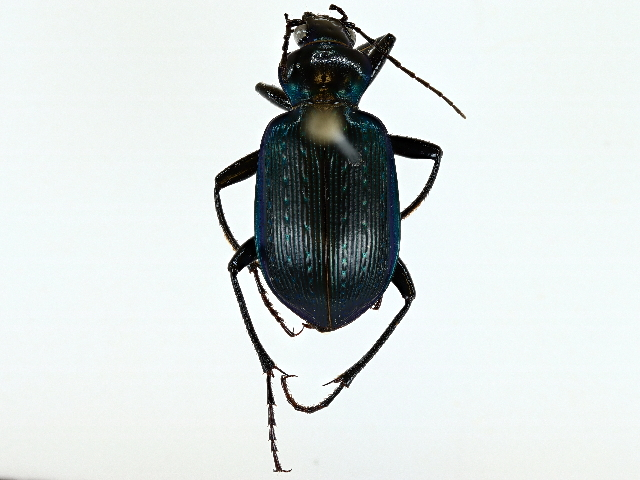

Scientific classification
- Domain: Eukaryota
- Kingdom: Animalia
- Phylum: Arthropoda
- Class: Insecta
- Order: Coleoptera
- Suborder: Adephaga
- Family: Carabidae
- Genus: Calosoma
- Species: C. granatense

Binomial name
- Calosoma granatense Gehin, 1885

Synonyms
- Castrida floreana Basilewsky, 1968; Calosoma howardi Linell, 1899; Calosoma galapagoum Howard, 1889

= Calosoma granatense =

Species of beetle

Calosoma granatense is a species of ground beetle in the subfamily of Carabinae. It was described by Gehin in 1885. This species is found on the Galapagos Islands.

== Subspecies ==
- Calosoma granatense granatense (Galapagos Islands) - wide-lines caterpillar hunter
- Calosoma granatense darwinia Van Dyke, 1953 (Galapagos Islands) - Darwin's caterpillar hunter
- Calosoma granatense floreanum (Basilewsky, 1968) (Galapagos Islands) - Floreana caterpillar hunter
