= Calosoma ampliator =

Scientific classification
- Domain: Eukaryota
- Kingdom: Animalia
- Phylum: Arthropoda
- Class: Insecta
- Order: Coleoptera
- Suborder: Adephaga
- Family: Carabidae
- Genus: Calosoma
- Species: C. ampliator

Binomial name
- Calosoma ampliator Bates, 1891

Synonyms
- Callisthenes ampliator

Species of beetle

Calosoma ampliator, the large beautiful black searcher, is a species of ground beetle in the subfamily of Carabinae. It was described by Henry Walter Bates in 1891. This species is found in Mexico (Chihuahua, Durango, Guanajuato, Sonora, Tamaulipas, Veracruz), where it is found in upland areas.
