= Calosoma glaciale =

Scientific classification
- Domain: Eukaryota
- Kingdom: Animalia
- Phylum: Arthropoda
- Class: Insecta
- Order: Coleoptera
- Suborder: Adephaga
- Family: Carabidae
- Genus: Calosoma
- Species: C. glaciale

Binomial name
- Calosoma glaciale Kolbe, 1905

Synonyms
- Orinodromus glacialis Kolbe, 1905

Species of beetle

Calosoma glaciale is a species of ground beetle in the subfamily of Carabinae. It was described by Kolbe in 1905. This species is found in Tanzania, where it is found at the base of the glacier on Mount Kilimanjaro.

Adults reach a length of 15-18 mm and black.
