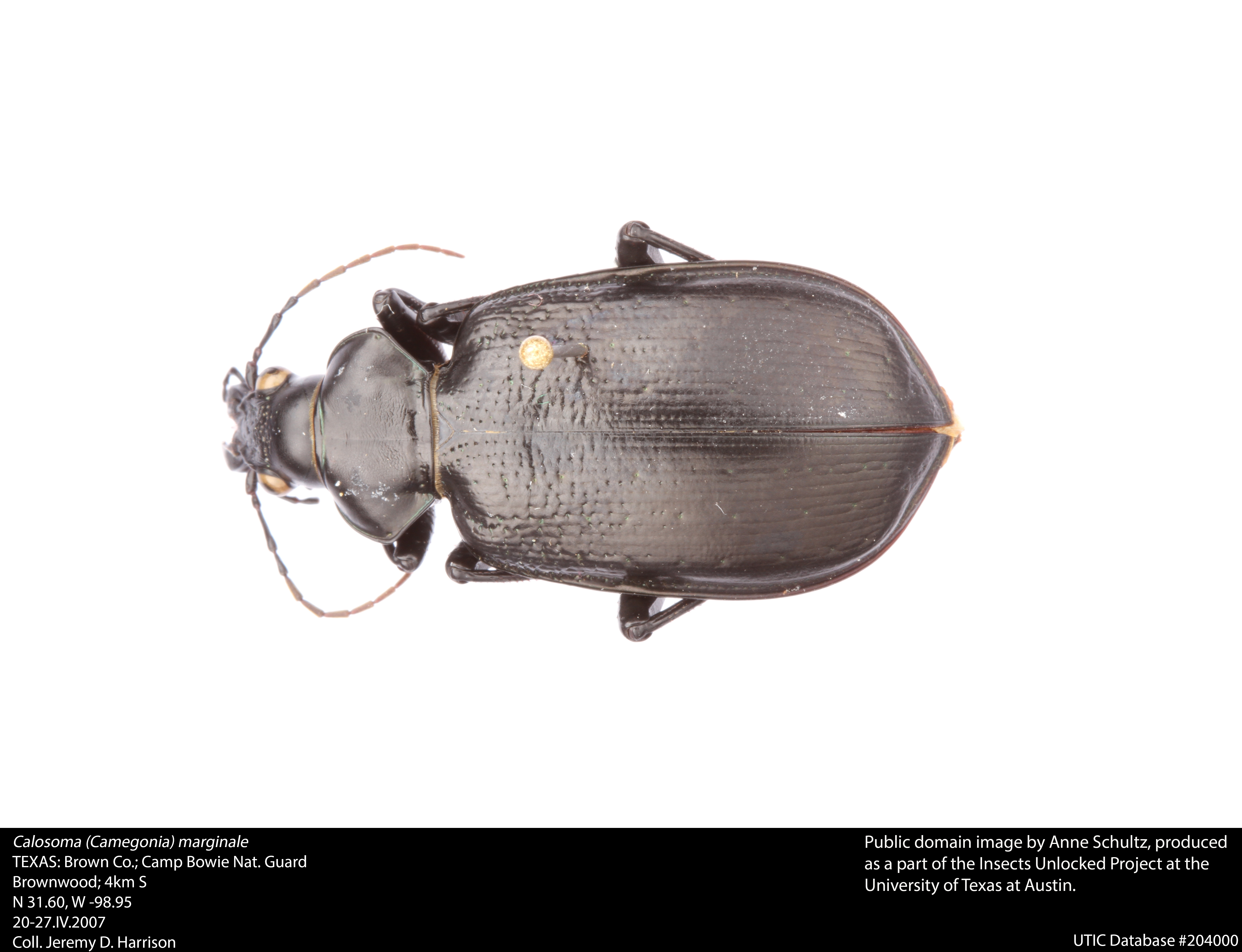

Scientific classification
- Kingdom: Animalia
- Phylum: Arthropoda
- Class: Insecta
- Order: Coleoptera
- Suborder: Adephaga
- Family: Carabidae
- Genus: Calosoma
- Species: C. marginale

Binomial name
- Calosoma marginale Casey, 1897

Synonyms
- Calosoma marginalis; Calosoma lecontei Csiki, 1927; Calosoma lugubre LeConte, 1853

= Calosoma marginale =

Species of beetle

Calosoma marginale, the rimmed caterpillar hunter, is a species of ground beetle in the family Carabidae. It is found in Central America and North America. This species is found in Costa Rica, Mexico (Chihuahua, Michoacan, Neuvo Leon, Tamaulipas) and the United States (Arizona, California, Colorado, Iowa, Illinois, Kansas, Missouri, Nebraska, New Mexico, Oklahoma, Texas), where is inhabits prairies, pastures, cultivated fields and wastelands.

Adults are crepuscular and overwinter in the ground. They prey on caterpillars and scarabaeids.
