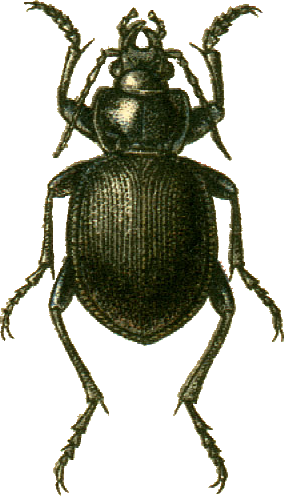

Scientific classification
- Domain: Eukaryota
- Kingdom: Animalia
- Phylum: Arthropoda
- Class: Insecta
- Order: Coleoptera
- Suborder: Adephaga
- Family: Carabidae
- Genus: Calosoma
- Species: C. panderi

Binomial name
- Calosoma panderi (Fischer von Waldheim, 1820)

Synonyms
- Callisthenes (Callisthenes) panderi Fischer von Waldheim, 1820; Callisthenes (Callisthenes) akkolicus Obydov & Gottwald, 2002; Callisthenes korelli Obydov, 2004; Callisthenes (Callisthenes) karelini Fischer von Waldheim, 1830; Calosoma breuningi Mandl, 1954; Calosoma cyaneosternum Mandl, 1954; Callisthenes vladimiri Obydov, 1998; Callisthenes (Callisthenes) panderi Fischer von Waldheim, 1820; Callisthenes (Callisthenes) pavlovskii Kryzhanovskij, 1955

= Calosoma panderi =

Species of ground beetle

Calosoma panderi is a species of ground beetle in the family Carabidae. It is found in Kazakhstan, Kyrgyzstan, and Russia.

== Subspecies ==
These five subspecies belong to the species Calosoma panderi:

- Calosoma panderi akkolicum (Obydov & Gottwald, 2002) (Kazakhstan and Kyrgyzstan)
- Calosoma panderi karelini (Fischer von Waldheim, 1830) (Kazakhstan)
- Calosoma panderi panderi (Fischer von Waldheim, 1820) (Kazakhstan and Russia)
- Calosoma panderi pavlovskii (Kryzhanovskij, 1955) (Kazakhstan and Kyrgyzstan)
- Calosoma panderi rostislavi Semenov, 1906 (Kazakhstan)
