= Calosoma viridisulcatum =

Scientific classification
- Domain: Eukaryota
- Kingdom: Animalia
- Phylum: Arthropoda
- Class: Insecta
- Order: Coleoptera
- Suborder: Adephaga
- Family: Carabidae
- Genus: Calosoma
- Species: C. viridisulcatum

Binomial name
- Calosoma viridisulcatum Chaudoir, 1863

Synonyms
- Blaptosoma vandenberghei Lassalle, 2009; Calosoma (Callitropa) viridilucens Beheim & Breuning, 1943; Callitropa laetula Jeannel, 1940; Calosoma latesulcatum Oberthür, 1883

Species of beetle

Calosoma viridisulcatum, the bright green caterpillar hunter, is a species of ground beetle in the subfamily of Carabinae. It was described by Maximilien Chaudoir in 1863. This species is found in Mexico.

Adults are brachypterous.
