= Calosoma himalayanum =

Scientific classification
- Domain: Eukaryota
- Kingdom: Animalia
- Phylum: Arthropoda
- Class: Insecta
- Order: Coleoptera
- Suborder: Adephaga
- Family: Carabidae
- Genus: Calosoma
- Species: C. himalayanum

Binomial name
- Calosoma himalayanum Gestro, 1875

Species of beetle

Calosoma himalayanum is a species of ground beetle in the subfamily of Carabinae. It was described by Gestro in 1875. This species is found in India (Himachal Pradesh, Jammu and Kashmir) and Pakistan.

Adults reach a length of 28-32 mm and have a dark bluish colour. They prey on Lymantria obfuscata.
