= Calosoma kenyense =

Scientific classification
- Kingdom: Animalia
- Phylum: Arthropoda
- Class: Insecta
- Order: Coleoptera
- Suborder: Adephaga
- Family: Carabidae
- Genus: Calosoma
- Species: C. kenyense

Binomial name
- Calosoma kenyense Breuning, 1928

Species of beetle

Calosoma kenyense is a species of ground beetle in the subfamily of Carabinae. It was described by Breuning in 1928. This species is found in Uganda and Kenya, where it is found on Mount Elgon.

Adults reach a length of 15-20 mm.
