= Calosoma peruviense =

Scientific classification
- Kingdom: Animalia
- Phylum: Arthropoda
- Clade: Pancrustacea
- Class: Insecta
- Order: Coleoptera
- Suborder: Adephaga
- Family: Carabidae
- Genus: Calosoma
- Species: C. peruviense

Binomial name
- Calosoma peruviense Mandl, 1917

Species of beetle

Calosoma peruviense, the Peru caterpillar hunter, is a species of ground beetle in the subfamily of Carabinae. It was described by Mandl in 1917. This species is found in Peru, where it inhabits the Cordillera de Vilcabamba.
