= Calosoma volkensi =

Scientific classification
- Domain: Eukaryota
- Kingdom: Animalia
- Phylum: Arthropoda
- Class: Insecta
- Order: Coleoptera
- Suborder: Adephaga
- Family: Carabidae
- Genus: Calosoma
- Species: C. volkensi

Binomial name
- Calosoma volkensi Kolbe, 1895

Synonyms
- Orinodromus volkensi Kolbe, 1895; Orinodromus albomaculatus Basilewsky, 1950

Species of beetle

Calosoma volkensi is a species of ground beetle in the subfamily of Carabinae. It was described by Kolbe in 1895. This species is found in Tanzania, where it is found on Mount Kilimanjaro.

Adults reach a length of 10,5-16 mm and are yellowish brown to blackish, with a large white spot on each elytra.

== Etymology ==
The species is named for German botanist Georg Ludwig August Volkens.
