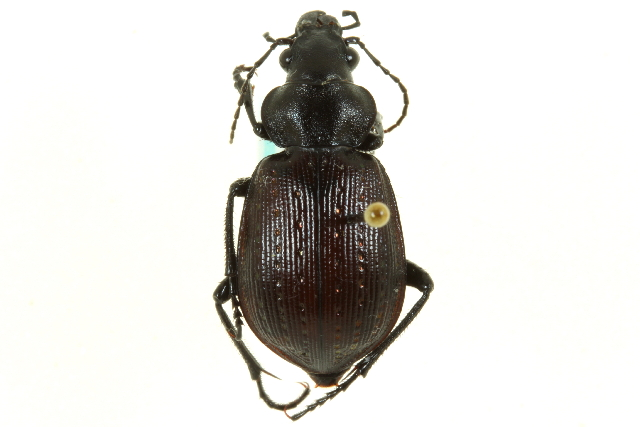

Scientific classification
- Domain: Eukaryota
- Kingdom: Animalia
- Phylum: Arthropoda
- Class: Insecta
- Order: Coleoptera
- Suborder: Adephaga
- Family: Carabidae
- Genus: Calosoma
- Species: C. lepidum

Binomial name
- Calosoma lepidum LeConte, 1844

Synonyms
- Callisthenes lepidus

= Calosoma lepidum =

Species of beetle

Calosoma lepidum, the neat beautiful black searcher, is a species of ground beetle in the subfamily Carabinae. It was described by John Lawrence LeConte in 1844. This species is found in Alberta, Manitoba, Saskatchewan, Montana, Nevada, South Dakota and Wyoming, where it inhabits open prairies with short grass.

Adults are sub-brachypterous.
