= Calosoma chinense =

Scientific classification
- Domain: Eukaryota
- Kingdom: Animalia
- Phylum: Arthropoda
- Class: Insecta
- Order: Coleoptera
- Suborder: Adephaga
- Family: Carabidae
- Genus: Calosoma
- Species: C. chinense

Binomial name
- Calosoma chinense Kirby, 1819

Synonyms
- Calosoma dianxicum Deuve & Tian, 2000; Calosoma yunnanense Breuning, 1927; Calosoma ogumae Matsumura, 1911; Calosoma aeneum Motschulsky, 1859; Campalita liaoningensis Li, 1992

Species of beetle

Calosoma chinense is a species of ground beetle in the subfamily of Carabinae. It was described by William Kirby in 1819. This species is found in China, North Korea, South Korea, Japan and Russia.
