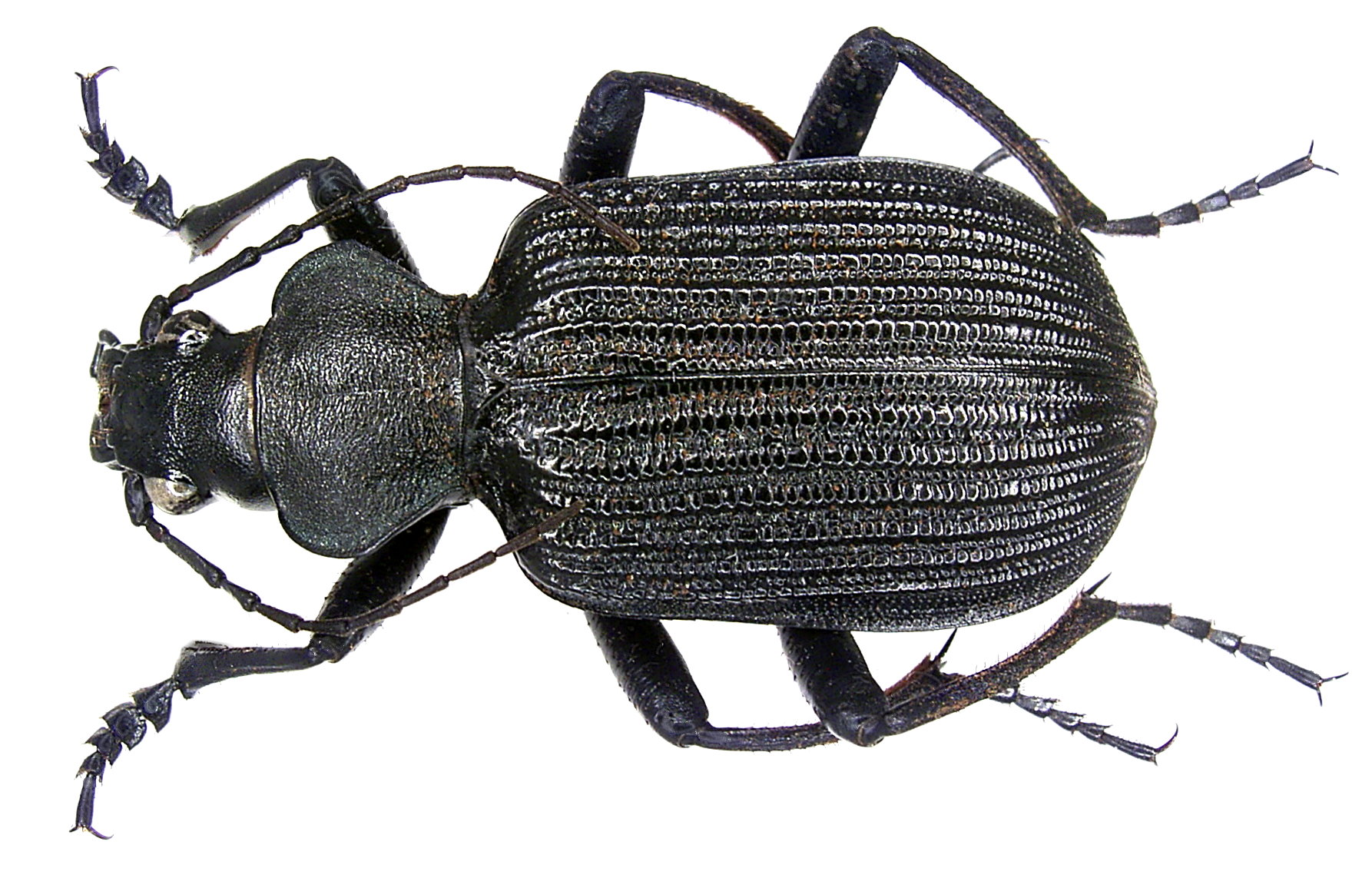

Scientific classification
- Domain: Eukaryota
- Kingdom: Animalia
- Phylum: Arthropoda
- Class: Insecta
- Order: Coleoptera
- Suborder: Adephaga
- Family: Carabidae
- Genus: Calosoma
- Species: C. planicolle

Binomial name
- Calosoma planicolle Chaudoir, 1869

Synonyms
- Calosoma procerum Harold, 1881

= Calosoma planicolle =

Species of beetle

Calosoma planicolle is a species of ground beetle in the subfamily of Carabinae. It was described by Maximilien Chaudoir in 1869. This species is found in Somalia, DR Congo, Uganda, Kenya, Tanzania, Zambia, Malawi, Mozambique, Zimbabwe, Botswana and South Africa.

Adults reach a length of 30-40 mm and have a glossy black colour.
