= Calosoma strandi =

Scientific classification
- Kingdom: Animalia
- Phylum: Arthropoda
- Class: Insecta
- Order: Coleoptera
- Suborder: Adephaga
- Family: Carabidae
- Genus: Calosoma
- Species: C. strandi

Binomial name
- Calosoma strandi Breuning, 1934

Species of beetle

Calosoma strandi is a species of ground beetle in the subfamily of Carabinae. It was described by Stephan von Breuning in 1934. This species is found in Eritrea, Somalia and Kenya.

Adults reach a length of 26-30 mm and have a dark bronze colour.

== Etymology ==
The species is named in for Norwegian entomologist and arachnologist Embrik Strand.
