= Calosoma leleupi =

Scientific classification
- Domain: Eukaryota
- Kingdom: Animalia
- Phylum: Arthropoda
- Class: Insecta
- Order: Coleoptera
- Suborder: Adephaga
- Family: Carabidae
- Genus: Calosoma
- Species: C. leleupi

Binomial name
- Calosoma leleupi Basilewsky, 1962

Synonyms
- Orinodromus leleupi Basilewsky, 1962

Species of beetle

Calosoma leleupi is a species of ground beetle in the subfamily of Carabinae. It was described by Pierre Basilewsky in 1962. This species is found in Tanzania, where it is found on mount Ngoro Ngoro.

== Etymology ==
The species is named for the entomologist Narcisse Leleup.
