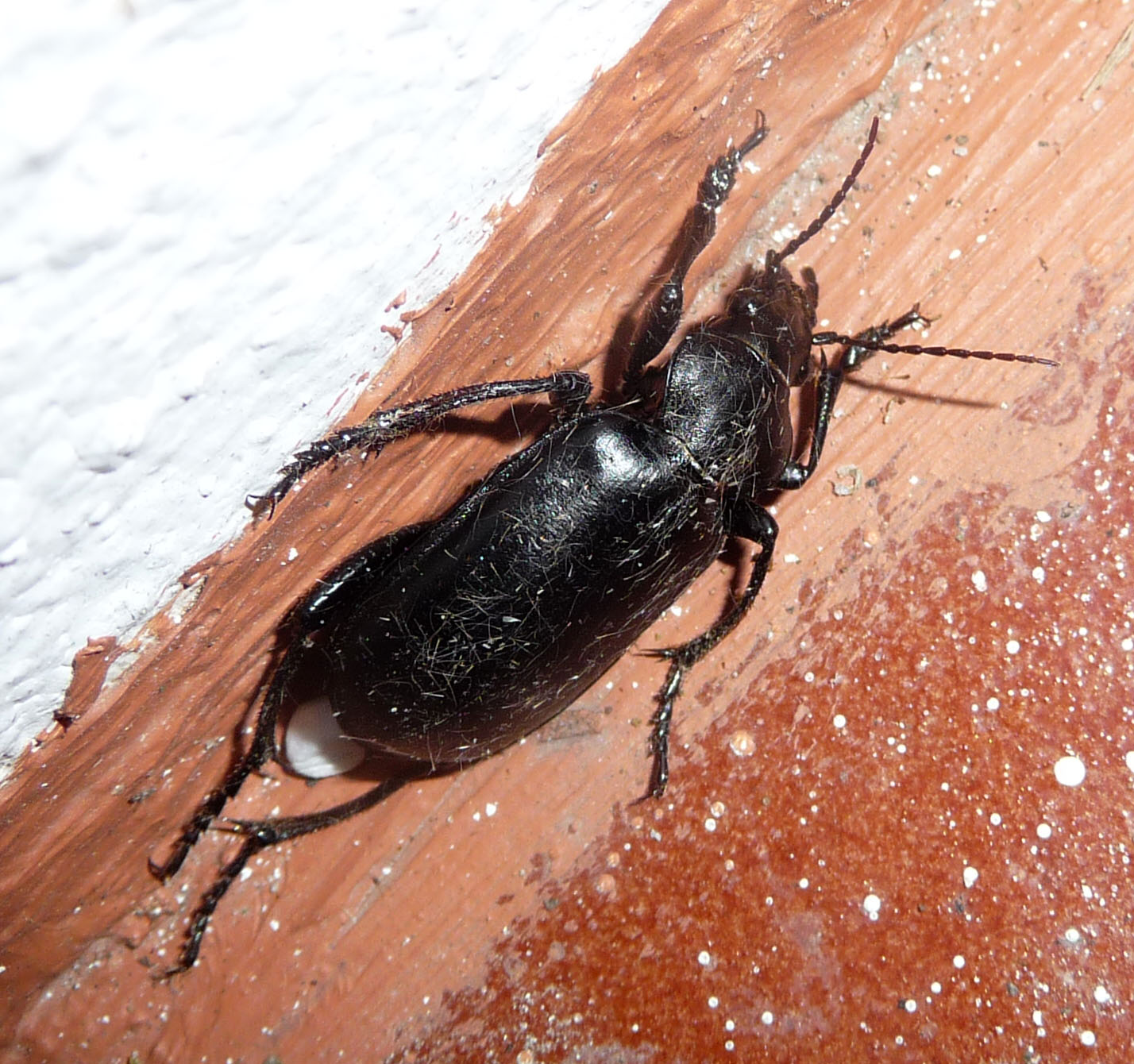

Scientific classification
- Domain: Eukaryota
- Kingdom: Animalia
- Phylum: Arthropoda
- Class: Insecta
- Order: Coleoptera
- Suborder: Adephaga
- Family: Carabidae
- Genus: Calosoma
- Species: C. maderae

Binomial name
- Calosoma maderae Fabricius, 1775

Synonyms
- Carabus maderae Fabricius, 1775; Carabus indagator Fabricius, 1787; Calosoma glabripenne Eidam, 1926; Carabus hortensis P.Rossi, 1792; Calosoma impunctatum Brañes, 1987; Campalita maroccana Lapouge, 1924; Campalita sturanii Raynaud & Marchal, 1967

= Calosoma maderae =

Species of beetle

Calosoma maderae is a species of ground beetle in the subfamily Carabinae which is 25 to 35 millimetres (0.98 to 1.38 in) long. It was described by Johan Christian Fabricius in 1775 and is found in Europe, North Africa and Asia.
