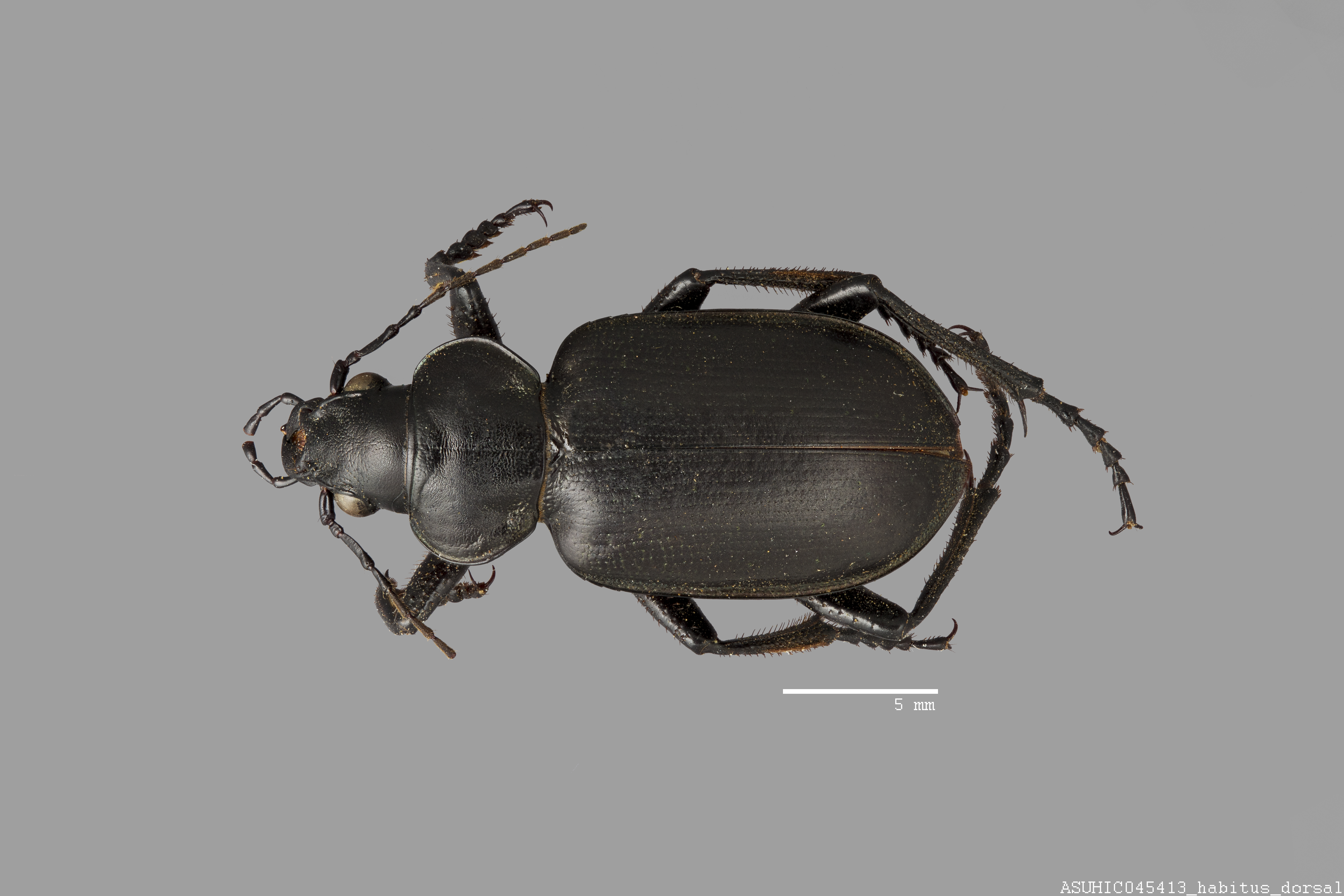

Scientific classification
- Domain: Eukaryota
- Kingdom: Animalia
- Phylum: Arthropoda
- Class: Insecta
- Order: Coleoptera
- Suborder: Adephaga
- Family: Carabidae
- Genus: Calosoma
- Species: C. affine

Binomial name
- Calosoma affine Chaudoir, 1843

Synonyms
- Callisthenes affinis; Chrysostigma affine; Calosoma azoricum Born, 1918; Calosoma triste LeConte, 1845; Calosoma tristoides Fall, 1910

= Calosoma affine =

Species of beetle

Calosoma affine, the related beautiful black searcher, is a species of ground beetle in the subfamily of Carabinae. It was described by Maximilien Chaudoir in 1843. This species is found in Mexico and the southern United States, where is inhabits pastures, cultivated fields and sand dunes.

Adults are diurnal and nocturnal and gregarious. They prey on lepidopterous caterpillars.
