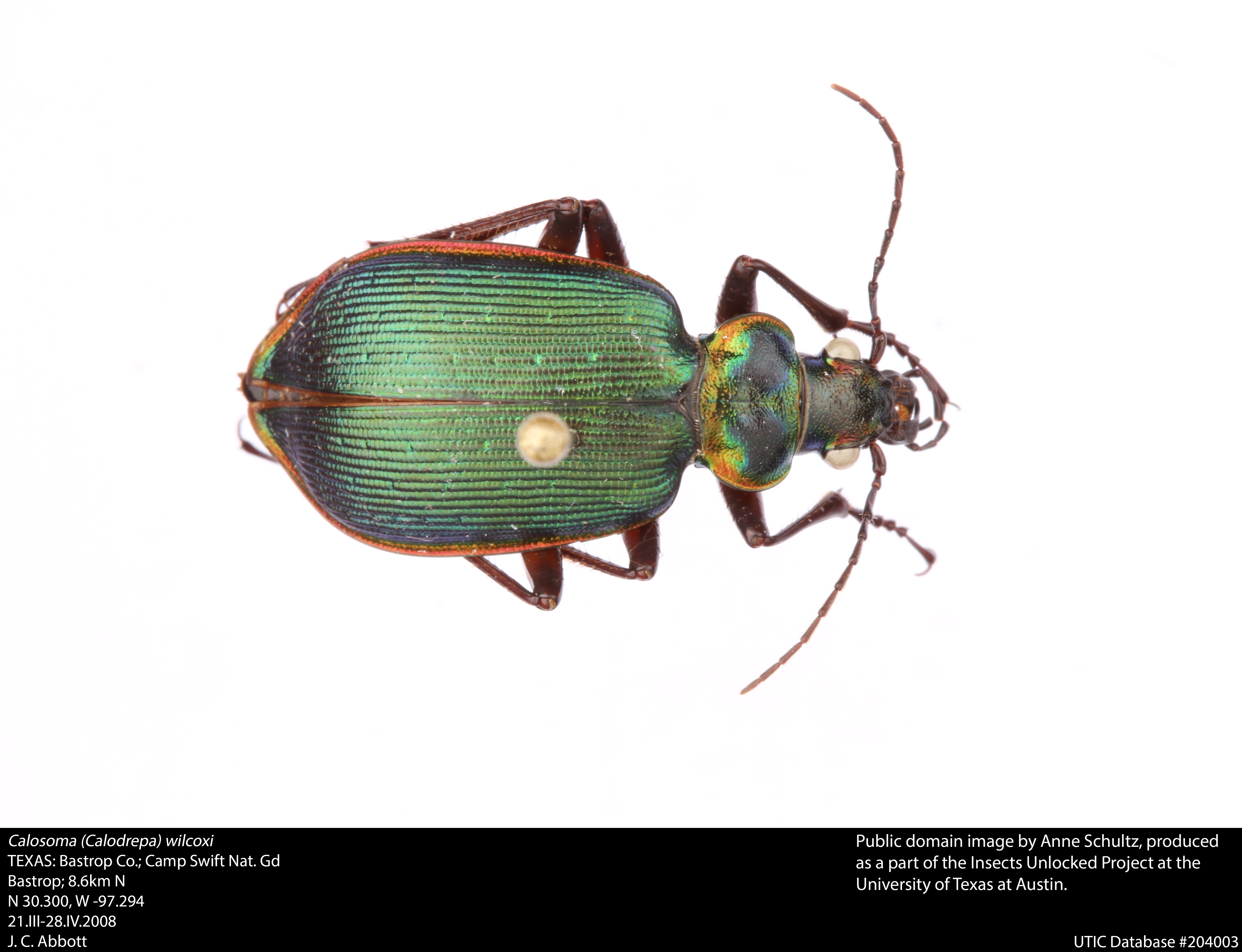

Scientific classification
- Domain: Eukaryota
- Kingdom: Animalia
- Phylum: Arthropoda
- Class: Insecta
- Order: Coleoptera
- Suborder: Adephaga
- Family: Carabidae
- Genus: Calosoma
- Species: C. wilcoxi

Binomial name
- Calosoma wilcoxi LeConte, 1848

= Calosoma wilcoxi =

Species of beetle

Calosoma wilcoxi, Wilcox's caterpillar hunter, is a species of ground beetle in the subfamily Carabinae. It was described by John Lawrence LeConte in 1848. It is found in Canada and the United States, where it inhabits deciduous forests and adjacent gardens and cultivated fields, as well as orchards and trees in urban areas.

Adults are nocturnal and diurnal and overwinter in cavities in the ground. They prey on caterpillars and grasshoppers.
