= Calosoma reitteri =

Scientific classification
- Domain: Eukaryota
- Kingdom: Animalia
- Phylum: Arthropoda
- Class: Insecta
- Order: Coleoptera
- Suborder: Adephaga
- Family: Carabidae
- Genus: Calosoma
- Species: C. reitteri

Binomial name
- Calosoma reitteri Roeschke, 1897

Species of ground beetle in the subfamily of Carabinae

Calosoma reitteri is a species of ground beetle in the subfamily of Carabinae found within Central Asia (Tajikistan, Kazakhstan, Turkmenistan, Afghanistan). It was described by Roeschke in 1897.

Adults reach a length of 26-28 mm and are uniform dark in colour.

== Etymology ==
It is named for entomologist Edmund Reitter.
