= Calosoma placerum =

Scientific classification
- Kingdom: Animalia
- Phylum: Arthropoda
- Class: Insecta
- Order: Coleoptera
- Suborder: Adephaga
- Family: Carabidae
- Genus: Calosoma
- Species: C. placerum

Binomial name
- Calosoma placerum (Gidaspow, 1959)

Synonyms
- Callisthenes placerus Gidaspow, 1959

Species of beetle

Calosoma placerum, the placer beautiful black searcher, is a species of beetle of the Carabidae family. This species is found in California, where it inhabits upland areas.

Adults are brachypterous.
