= Calosoma abyssinicum =

Scientific classification
- Domain: Eukaryota
- Kingdom: Animalia
- Phylum: Arthropoda
- Class: Insecta
- Order: Coleoptera
- Suborder: Adephaga
- Family: Carabidae
- Genus: Calosoma
- Species: C. abyssinicum

Binomial name
- Calosoma abyssinicum Gestro, 1880

Synonyms
- Carabops angustipennis Jeannel, 1940; Carabops femoralis Jakobson, 1900; Carabops hadianus Rougemont, 1976; Carabops kachovskyi Jakobson, 1900

Species of beetle

Calosoma abyssinicum is a species of ground beetle in the subfamily of Carabinae. It was described by Gestro in 1880. This species is found in Ethiopia.

Adults reach a length of 16-20 mm and are brachypterous.
