= Calosoma galapageium =

Scientific classification
- Domain: Eukaryota
- Kingdom: Animalia
- Phylum: Arthropoda
- Class: Insecta
- Order: Coleoptera
- Suborder: Adephaga
- Family: Carabidae
- Genus: Calosoma
- Species: C. galapageium

Binomial name
- Calosoma galapageium Hope, 1838

Species of beetle

Calosoma galapageium, the Galapagos caterpillar hunter, is a species of ground beetle in the subfamily of Carabinae. It was described by Hope in 1838. This species is found on the Galapagos Islands, where it inhabits open grassy meadows at the top of Isla Santiago.

Adults are brachypterous.
