= Calosoma palmeri =

Scientific classification
- Domain: Eukaryota
- Kingdom: Animalia
- Phylum: Arthropoda
- Class: Insecta
- Order: Coleoptera
- Suborder: Adephaga
- Family: Carabidae
- Genus: Calosoma
- Species: C. palmeri

Binomial name
- Calosoma palmeri Horn, 1876

Synonyms
- Callitropa palmeri G. Horn, 1876

Species of beetle

Calosoma palmeri, Palmer's caterpillar hunter, is a species of ground beetle in the subfamily of Carabinae. It was described by George Henry Horn in 1876. This species is found on Guadalupe Island, where it inhabits rocky pine-oak savannah and desert scrub.

Adults are brachypterous.
