= Calosoma sponsa =

Scientific classification
- Kingdom: Animalia
- Phylum: Arthropoda
- Class: Insecta
- Order: Coleoptera
- Suborder: Adephaga
- Family: Carabidae
- Genus: Calosoma
- Species: C. sponsa

Binomial name
- Calosoma sponsa Casey, 1897

Synonyms
- Calosoma parviceps Casey, 1897

Species of beetle

Calosoma sponsa is a species of ground beetle in the subfamily of Carabinae. It was described by Casey in 1897. This species is found in Baja California, Arizona, California, New Mexico, Nevada and Utah, where it inhabits sandy clearings.
