= Calosoma linelli =

Scientific classification
- Domain: Eukaryota
- Kingdom: Animalia
- Phylum: Arthropoda
- Class: Insecta
- Order: Coleoptera
- Suborder: Adephaga
- Family: Carabidae
- Genus: Calosoma
- Species: C. linelli

Binomial name
- Calosoma linelli Mutchler, 1925

Species of beetle

Calosoma linelli, Linell's caterpillar hunter, is a species of ground beetle in the subfamily of Carabinae. It was described by Mutchler in 1925. This species is found on the Galapagos Islands, where it inhabits open pampa areas.

Adults are brachypterous.
