= Calosoma morelianum =

Scientific classification
- Kingdom: Animalia
- Phylum: Arthropoda
- Class: Insecta
- Order: Coleoptera
- Suborder: Adephaga
- Family: Carabidae
- Genus: Calosoma
- Species: C. morelianum

Binomial name
- Calosoma morelianum Bates, 1891

Synonyms
- Calosoma balli Rotger, 1976

Species of beetle

Calosoma morelianum, the Morelos caterpillar hunter, is a species of beetle of the Carabidae family. This species is found in Mexico (Distrito Federal, Morelos, Veracruz), where it inhabits mountains.

Adults are brachypterous.
