= Calosoma glabratum =

Scientific classification
- Kingdom: Animalia
- Phylum: Arthropoda
- Class: Insecta
- Order: Coleoptera
- Suborder: Adephaga
- Family: Carabidae
- Genus: Calosoma
- Species: C. glabratum

Binomial name
- Calosoma glabratum Dejean, 1831

Synonyms
- Calosoma bolivianum Géhin, 1885

Species of beetle

Calosoma glabratum, the smooth caterpillar hunter, is a species of ground beetle in the subfamily of Carabinae. It was described by Pierre François Marie Auguste Dejean in 1831. This species is found in Bolivia, Colombia, Peru and Panama, where it inhabits grasslands and cultivated fields.
