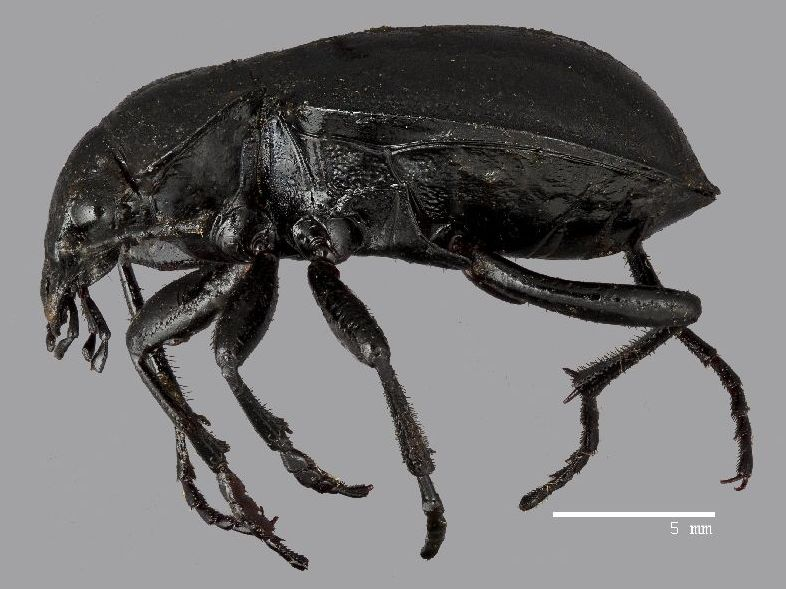

Scientific classification
- Domain: Eukaryota
- Kingdom: Animalia
- Phylum: Arthropoda
- Class: Insecta
- Order: Coleoptera
- Suborder: Adephaga
- Family: Carabidae
- Genus: Calosoma
- Species: C. haydeni

Binomial name
- Calosoma haydeni Horn, 1870

= Calosoma haydeni =

Species of beetle

Calosoma haydeni is a species of ground beetle in the subfamily of Carabinae. It was described by Horn in 1870. This species is found in Mexico and the southern United States.

Adults are brachypterous.

== Subspecies ==
- Calosoma haydeni haydeni (Chihuahua, Arizona, Colorado, New Mexico, Texas) - Hayden's caterpillar hunter
- Calosoma haydeni punctulicolle Bates, 1891 (Chihuahua, Coahuila, Distrito Federal, Durango, Neuvo Leon, San Luis Potosi; Texas) - holey-necked caterpillar hunter
