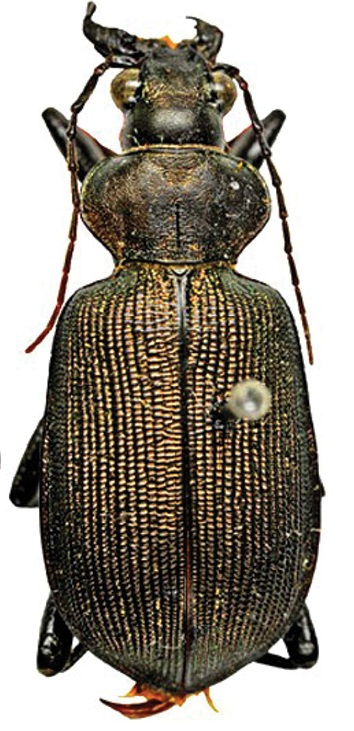

Scientific classification
- Kingdom: Animalia
- Phylum: Arthropoda
- Class: Insecta
- Order: Coleoptera
- Suborder: Adephaga
- Family: Carabidae
- Subfamily: Carabinae
- Tribe: Carabini
- Genus: Calosoma
- Species: C. roeschkei

Binomial name
- Calosoma roeschkei Breuning, 1927

Synonyms
- Calosoma aethiops Jeannel, 1940

= Calosoma roeschkei =

Species of beetle

Calosoma roeschkei is a species of ground beetle in the family Carabidae. It is found in Africa (Niger, Chad, Sudan, Eritrea, Somalia, Kenya, Tanzania).

Adults reach a length of 18-25 mm and have a light bronze colour. Adults are diurnal and nocturnal.

== Etymology ==
The species is named for German entomologist Hans Friedrich Wilhelm Roeschke.
