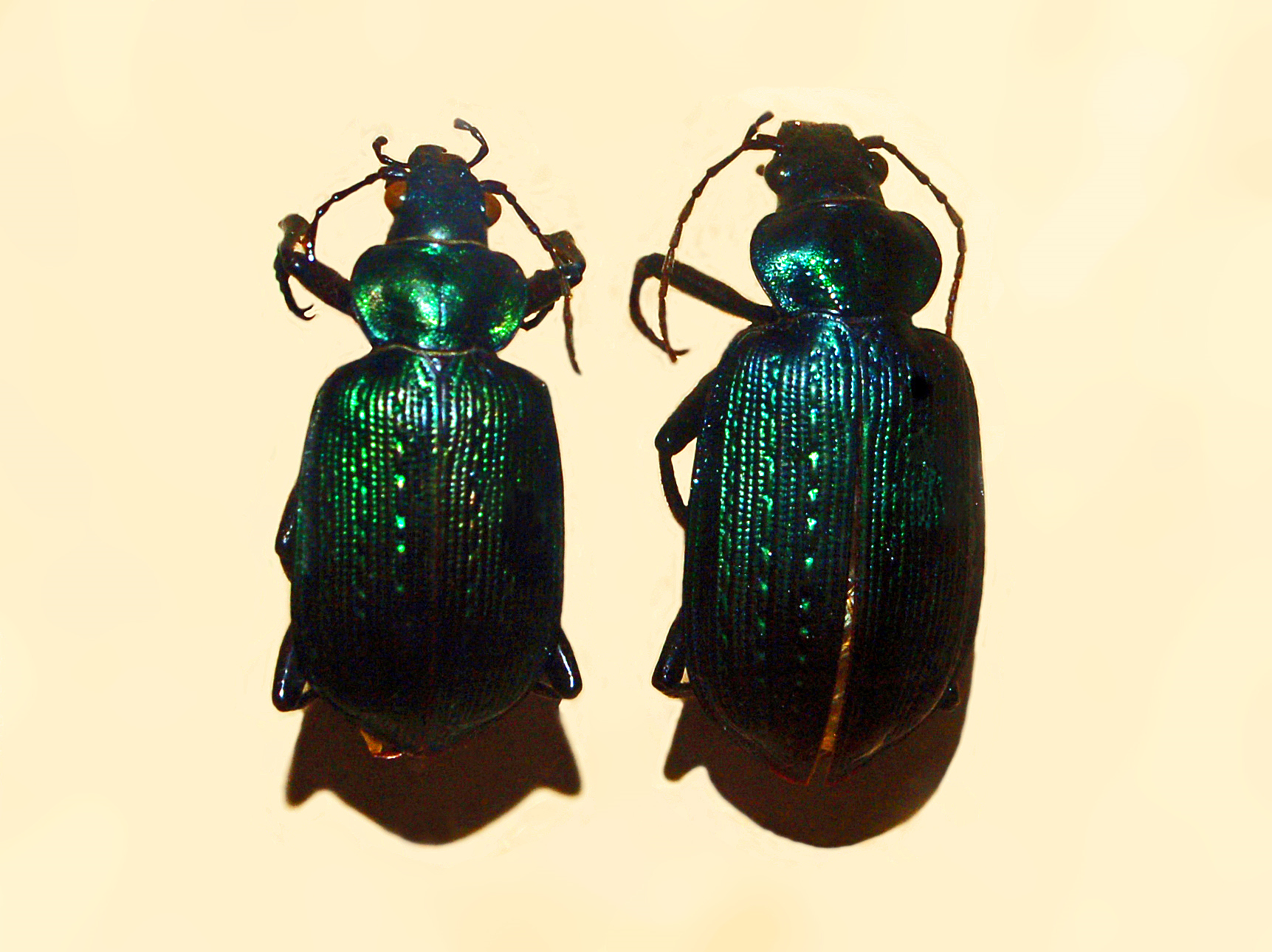
- Calosoma retusum from Argentina. Male and female

Scientific classification
- Kingdom: Animalia
- Phylum: Arthropoda
- Class: Insecta
- Order: Coleoptera
- Suborder: Adephaga
- Family: Carabidae
- Genus: Calosoma
- Species: C. retusum

Binomial name
- Calosoma retusum Fabricius, 1775

Synonyms
- Carabus retusum Fabricius, 1775; Calosoma laterale Kirby, 1818; Calosoma bonariense Dejean, 1831; Calosoma patagoniense Hope, 1838; Callistriga retusum Motschulsky, 1865; Calosoma retusum Breuning, 1927; Caminara retusa Lapouge, 1932; Caminara lateralis Lapouge, 1932; Castrida retusum Jeannel, 1940; Calosoma proseni Dallas, 1944; Calosoma retusum Gidaspow, 1963; Calosoma retusum Erwin, 1991

= Calosoma retusum =

Species of beetle

Calosoma retusum, the blunt-toothed caterpillar hunter, is a beetle of the family Carabidae.

== Description ==
Calosoma retusum reaches about 25–32 millimetres (0.98–1.26 in) in length. This species usually has a bright metallic dark green or bronze green coloration, sometime with bluish reflections. The borders of the pronotum are rounded and raised. Elytra are striated, with large punctures. These beetles are voracious consumer of caterpillars, so they are considered beneficial insects for the agriculture.

== Distribution ==
This species occurs in southern Brazil, Uruguay, Argentina, Bolivia and Peru.
