= Calosoma brachycerum =

Scientific classification
- Domain: Eukaryota
- Kingdom: Animalia
- Phylum: Arthropoda
- Class: Insecta
- Order: Coleoptera
- Suborder: Adephaga
- Family: Carabidae
- Genus: Calosoma
- Species: C. brachycerum

Binomial name
- Calosoma brachycerum Gersteacke

Synonyms
- Carabus brachycerus Gerstaecker, 1884; Carabomorphus katonae Csiki, 1907

Species of beetle

Calosoma brachycerum is a species of ground beetle in the subfamily of Carabinae. It was described by Gersteacke. This species is found in Kenya and Tanzania.
