= Calosoma costipenne =

Scientific classification
- Domain: Eukaryota
- Kingdom: Animalia
- Phylum: Arthropoda
- Class: Insecta
- Order: Coleoptera
- Suborder: Adephaga
- Family: Carabidae
- Genus: Calosoma
- Species: C. costipenne

Binomial name
- Calosoma costipenne Chaudoir, 1869

Species of beetle

Calosoma costipenne, the ribbed caterpillar hunter, is a species of ground beetle in the subfamily of Carabinae. It was described by Maximilien Chaudoir in 1869. This species is found in Mexico (Guerrero, Hidalgo, México), where it inhabits mountains.

Adults are brachypterous.
