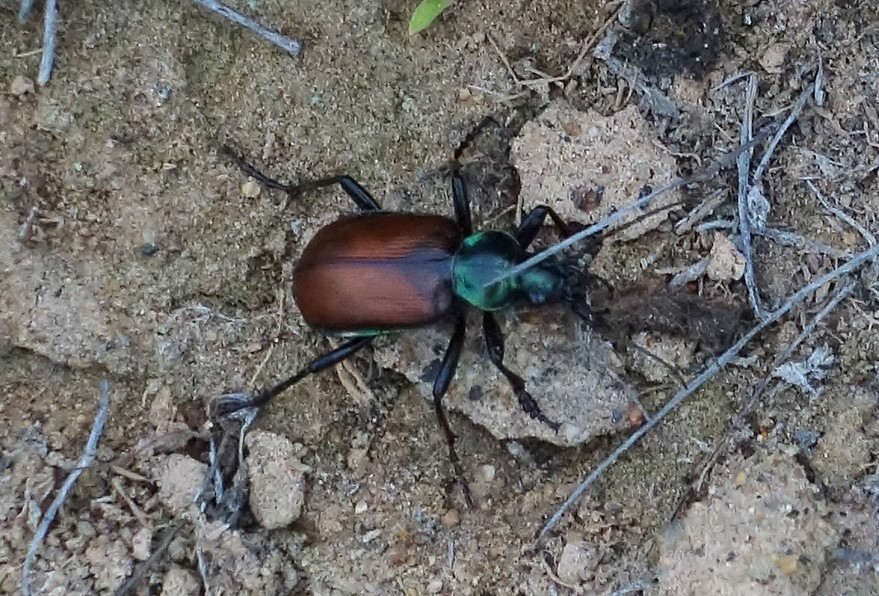

Scientific classification
- Kingdom: Animalia
- Phylum: Arthropoda
- Class: Insecta
- Order: Coleoptera
- Suborder: Adephaga
- Family: Carabidae
- Genus: Calosoma
- Species: C. rufipenne

Binomial name
- Calosoma rufipenne Dejean, 1831

= Calosoma rufipenne =

Species of beetle

Calosoma rufipenne, the red-winged caterpillar hunter, is a species of ground beetle in the subfamily of Carabinae. It was described by Dejean in 1831. This species is found in Chile and Peru, where it inhabits lomas, pampas and cultivated fields.
