= Calosoma gestroi =

Scientific classification
- Kingdom: Animalia
- Phylum: Arthropoda
- Class: Insecta
- Order: Coleoptera
- Suborder: Adephaga
- Family: Carabidae
- Genus: Calosoma
- Species: C. gestroi

Binomial name
- Calosoma gestroi Breuning, 1928

Species of beetle

Calosoma gestroi is a species of ground beetle in the subfamily of Carabinae. It was described by Stephan von Breuning in 1928. This species is found in Ethiopia.

Adults reach a length of 12-16 mm and are dark blue. They are brachypterous.

== Etymology ==
The species is named for Italian entomologist Raffaello Gestro.
