= Calosoma lugens =

Scientific classification
- Domain: Eukaryota
- Kingdom: Animalia
- Phylum: Arthropoda
- Class: Insecta
- Order: Coleoptera
- Suborder: Adephaga
- Family: Carabidae
- Genus: Calosoma
- Species: C. lugens

Binomial name
- Calosoma lugens Chaudoir, 1869

Synonyms
- Calosoma irregulare Reitter, 1902

Species of beetle

Calosoma lugens is a species of ground beetle in the subfamily of Carabinae. It was described by Maximilien Chaudoir in 1869. This species is found in northern China, North Korea, South Korea, Japan, the Russian Far East and Mongolia.

Adults reach a length of 26-31 mm.
