= Calosoma monticola =

Scientific classification
- Kingdom: Animalia
- Phylum: Arthropoda
- Class: Insecta
- Order: Coleoptera
- Suborder: Adephaga
- Family: Carabidae
- Genus: Calosoma
- Species: C. monticola

Binomial name
- Calosoma monticola Casey, 1913

Species of beetle

Calosoma monticola, the mountain beautiful black searcher, is a species of ground beetle in the subfamily of Carabinae. It was described by Casey in 1913. This species is found in California, Idaho, Nevada, Oregon, Utah, Washington and Wyoming, where it inhabits sagebrush areas.

Adults are brachypterous and have been recorded preying on cutworms, wireworms, scarabaeids, coccinelids, meloids, and staphylinds.
