= Calosoma raffrayi =

Scientific classification
- Kingdom: Animalia
- Phylum: Arthropoda
- Class: Insecta
- Order: Coleoptera
- Suborder: Adephaga
- Family: Carabidae
- Genus: Calosoma
- Species: C. raffrayi

Binomial name
- Calosoma raffrayi Fairmaire, 1883

Synonyms
- Calosoma caraboides Raffray, 1882

Species of beetle

Calosoma raffrayi is a species of ground beetle in the subfamily of Carabinae. It was described by Fairmaire in 1883. This species is found in Ethiopia.

Adults reach a length of 11-18 mm and are uniformly black and brachypterous.

== Etymology ==
The species is named for after French entomologist Achille Marie Jacques.
