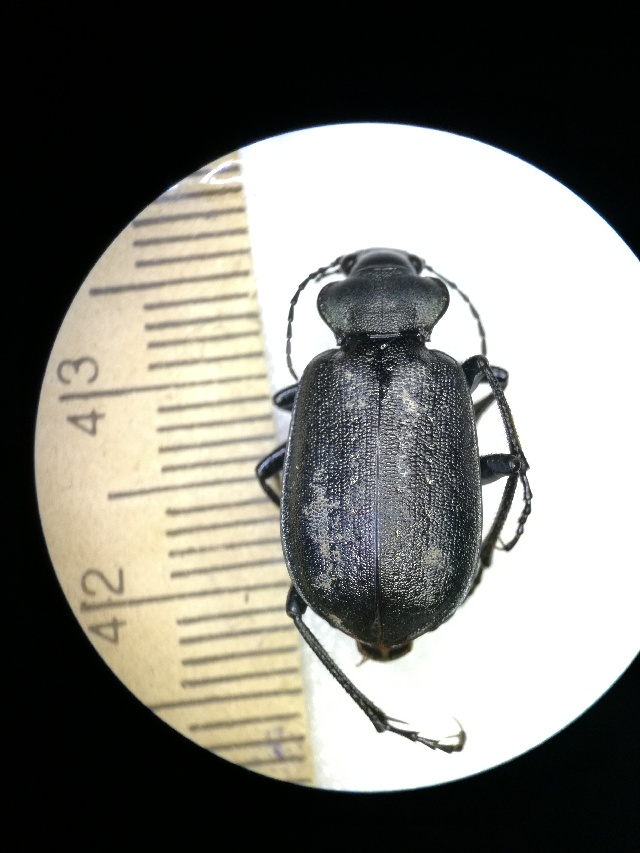

Scientific classification
- Domain: Eukaryota
- Kingdom: Animalia
- Phylum: Arthropoda
- Class: Insecta
- Order: Coleoptera
- Suborder: Adephaga
- Family: Carabidae
- Genus: Calosoma
- Species: C. denticolle

Binomial name
- Calosoma denticolle Gebler, 1833

Synonyms
- Calosoma suensoni Mandl, 1981; Calosoma mongolicum Lapouge, 1930; Callisoma rugulosum Motschulsky, 1850; Calosoma rugulosum Motschulsky, 1850; Calosoma granulosum Motschulsky, 1844; Calosoma lugubre Motschulsky, 1844

= Calosoma denticolle =

Species of beetle

Calosoma denticolle is a species of ground beetle in the subfamily of Carabinae. It was described by Gebler in 1833. It is found in Finland, Belarus, Ukraine, Bulgaria, Romania, Moldova, Turkey, Iran, Georgia, Armenia, Azerbaijan, Kazakhstan, China, Russia and Mongolia.
