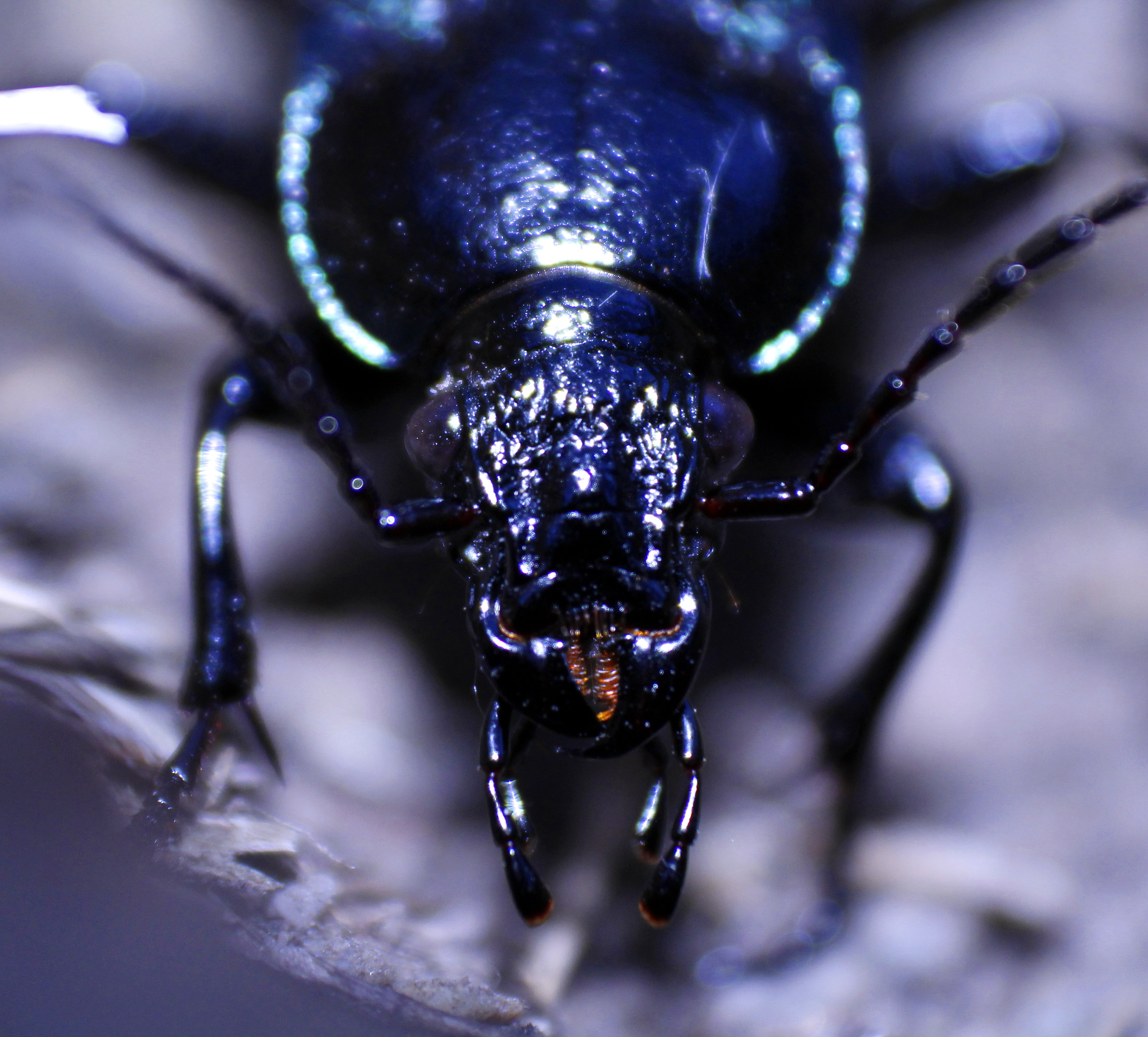

Scientific classification
- Domain: Eukaryota
- Kingdom: Animalia
- Phylum: Arthropoda
- Class: Insecta
- Order: Coleoptera
- Suborder: Adephaga
- Family: Carabidae
- Genus: Calosoma
- Species: C. externum

Binomial name
- Calosoma externum Say, 1823

Synonyms
- Carabus externus Say, 1823; Calosoma longipenne Dejean, 1831

= Calosoma externum =

Species of beetle

Calosoma externum, the narrow searcher beetle or churchyard caterpillar hunter, is a species of ground beetle in the subfamily of Carabinae. It was described by Say in 1823. This species is found in most of the United States, where it inhabits fallow fields and may also be found around margins of standing water. The species has also been recorded from the northern shores of Lake Erie in Canada.

Adults reach a length of 28-35 mm and have a black body with bluish reflections on the margins.

Adults prey on caterpillars of Melanoplus, Cirphis, Lachnosterna, Malacosoma and Porthetria species.
