= Cirphis =

Cirphis may refer to:

- Mount Cirphis in Greece, between the Bay of Antikyra and the valley of the Pleistus
- Cirphis (Phocis), a town of ancient Phocis, Greece
- Cirphis, a genus of moths
