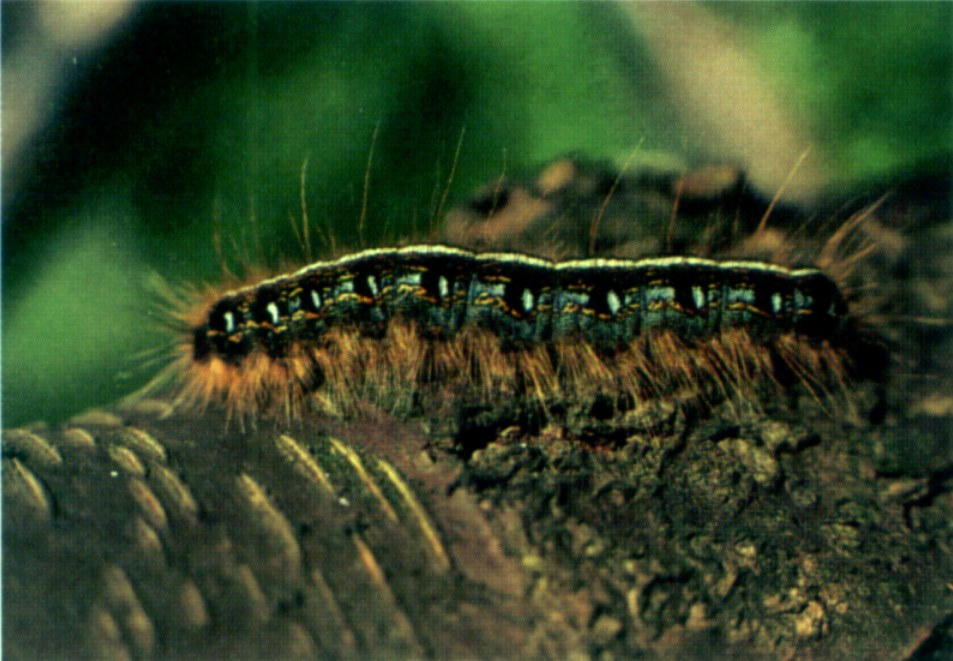
- Eastern tent caterpillar, Malacosoma americanum

Scientific classification
- Kingdom: Animalia
- Phylum: Arthropoda
- Clade: Pancrustacea
- Class: Insecta
- Order: Lepidoptera
- Family: Lasiocampidae
- Subfamily: Lasiocampinae
- Tribe: Lasiocampini
- Genus: Malacosoma; Hübner, 1822

Species
- About 26, including: Malacosoma americanum, eastern tent caterpillar; Malacosoma californicum, western tent caterpillar; Malacosoma castrense, ground lackey; Malacosoma disstrium, forest tent caterpillar; Malacosoma neustrium, lackey moth

= Tent caterpillar =

Tent caterpillars

Moth larvae from the genus Malacosoma

Tent caterpillars are moderately sized caterpillars, or moth larvae, belonging to the genus Malacosoma in the family Lasiocampidae. Twenty-six species have been described, six of which occur in North America and the rest in Eurasia. Some species are considered to have subspecies as well. They are often considered pests for their habit of defoliating trees. They are among the most social of all caterpillars and exhibit many noteworthy behaviors.

Tent caterpillars are readily recognized because they are social, colorful, diurnal and build conspicuous silk tents in the branches of host trees. Some species, such as the eastern tent caterpillar, Malacosoma americanum, and caterpillars of the small eggar moth, Eriogaster lanestris, build a single large tent which is typically occupied through the whole of the larval stage, while others build a series of small tents that are sequentially abandoned. Whereas tent caterpillars make their tents in the nodes and branches of a tree's limbs, fall webworms enclose leaves and small branches at the ends of the limbs.

== Life cycle ==
The following description of the tent caterpillar life cycle is based on that of the eastern tent caterpillar, the best-known species. The details of the life histories of other species vary to a small extent.

Tent caterpillars hatch from their eggs in the early spring at the time the leaves of their host trees are just unfolding. The caterpillars establish their tent soon after they hatch. The tent is constructed at a site that intercepts the early morning sun. The position of the tent is critical because the caterpillars must bask in the sun to elevate their temperatures above the cool ambient temperatures that occur in the early spring. Studies have shown that when the body temperature of a caterpillar is less than about 15 °C (59 °F), digestion cannot occur. The tent consists of discrete layers of silk separated by gaps and the temperature in these compartments varies markedly. Caterpillars can adjust their body temperatures by moving from one compartment to another. On cool mornings they typically rest in a tight aggregate just under a sunlit surface of the tent. It is not uncommon to find that the temperature of the aggregate is as much as 30 °C (86 °F) warmer than the surrounding air temperature on cold but sunny spring mornings. Later on in the spring, temperatures may become excessive at midday and the caterpillars may retreat to the shaded outside surface of the tent to cool down.

The digestive physiology of tent caterpillars is tuned to young leaves, and their need to complete their larval development before the leaves of the host trees become too aged for them to eat compels them to feed several times each day. At the onset of a bout of foraging, caterpillars leave the tent en masse, moving to distant feeding sites. Immediately after feeding the caterpillars return to the tent and aggregate in sunlight to facilitate the digestive process. Thus, eastern tent caterpillars are central place foragers. In contrast, the forest tent caterpillar is a nomadic forager that establishes a series of temporary resting sites during the course of its larval development.

Studies have shown that eastern tent caterpillars recruit their tent mates to go on food finds. Caterpillars move from the tent in search of food, laying down an exploratory pheromone trail as they pass over the branches of the host tree. These chemical exploratory trails allow caterpillars to find their way back to the tent. If a caterpillar finds food and feeds to repletion, it returns to the tent, laying down a recruitment trail that serves to recruit hungry tent mates to its food find. The chemical nature of the pheromone has been determined, but it is unclear how exploratory and recruitment trails differ. The chemical recruitment trail of the eastern tent caterpillar is remarkably similar to the pheromone trails that are used by ants and termites to alert nest mates to the discovery of food.

Leaves consist largely of nondigestible components, and it has been estimated that tent caterpillars void as frass (fecal pellets) nearly half of the energy they ingest. As a consequence, a colony of caterpillars produces large quantities of frass. This is particularly noticeable during outbreaks of the forest tent caterpillar. Frass dropping from treetops in which the caterpillars are feeding create the auditory illusion of rainfall. Tent caterpillars typically have five to six larval instars. It is estimated that the last instar consumes about 80% of all the food taken in by a larva during the whole of its life cycle. Consequently, it is not uncommon for populations of forest tent caterpillars to go unnoticed until the last instar, when their feeding causes extensive defoliation of trees.

Caterpillars grow rapidly and typically complete their larval development in seven to eight weeks. When fully grown, the caterpillars leave the natal tree and seek protected places on the ground or under the eaves of buildings to spin their cocoons. About two weeks later, they emerge as adults. Shortly after eclosing from the cocoon, the female moth secretes a pheromone which draws males to her. Mating typically occurs in the early evening and the mated female, already fully laden with eggs, typically oviposits the full complement later that same evening. The eggs are placed around the circumference of a branch and covered with a frothy material called spumaline. Spumaline is hydrophilic and prevents the eggs from drying out. It also serves as a protective covering which limits the ability of small wasps to parasitize the eggs. Although the male moth may live for a week or more, the female dies soon after laying her eggs. Thus, the whole of the female's adult life may take place in fewer than 24 hours.

Shortly after the egg mass is deposited, embryogenesis begins. Within three weeks or so, small larvae can be found within each egg mass. These pharate larvae lie sequestered within the shells of the eggs until the following spring. Henceforth, these encased larvae are the most durable of the insect's life stages. In northern areas, the pharate larvae are highly freeze-tolerant and can withstand midwinter temperatures of −40 °C (−40 °F) or lower.

Tent caterpillars exhibit boom-or-bust population dynamics. The most notorious of the outbreak species is the forest tent caterpillar. During outbreaks, the caterpillars can become so abundant that they are capable of completely defoliating tens of thousands of acres of forest. Even though these outbreaks do not follow true cycles in the sense that they occur at regular intervals, some particularly prone regions have recorded outbreaks every ten years or so. Caterpillars rarely remain in outbreak numbers for more than two to three years. Factors which bring outbreaks to a close include parasitoids and disease. In some cases populations collapse because caterpillars starve to death either because trees are completely defoliated before the caterpillars are fully grown or because the quality of host leaves declines to the point where they are no longer palatable. Defoliated trees typically refoliate after caterpillar attacks and experience no lasting damage. In some cases, however, trees or parts of trees may be killed after several seasons of repeated defoliation. This has occurred when forest tent caterpillars defoliated sugar maples that were already stressed due to drought.

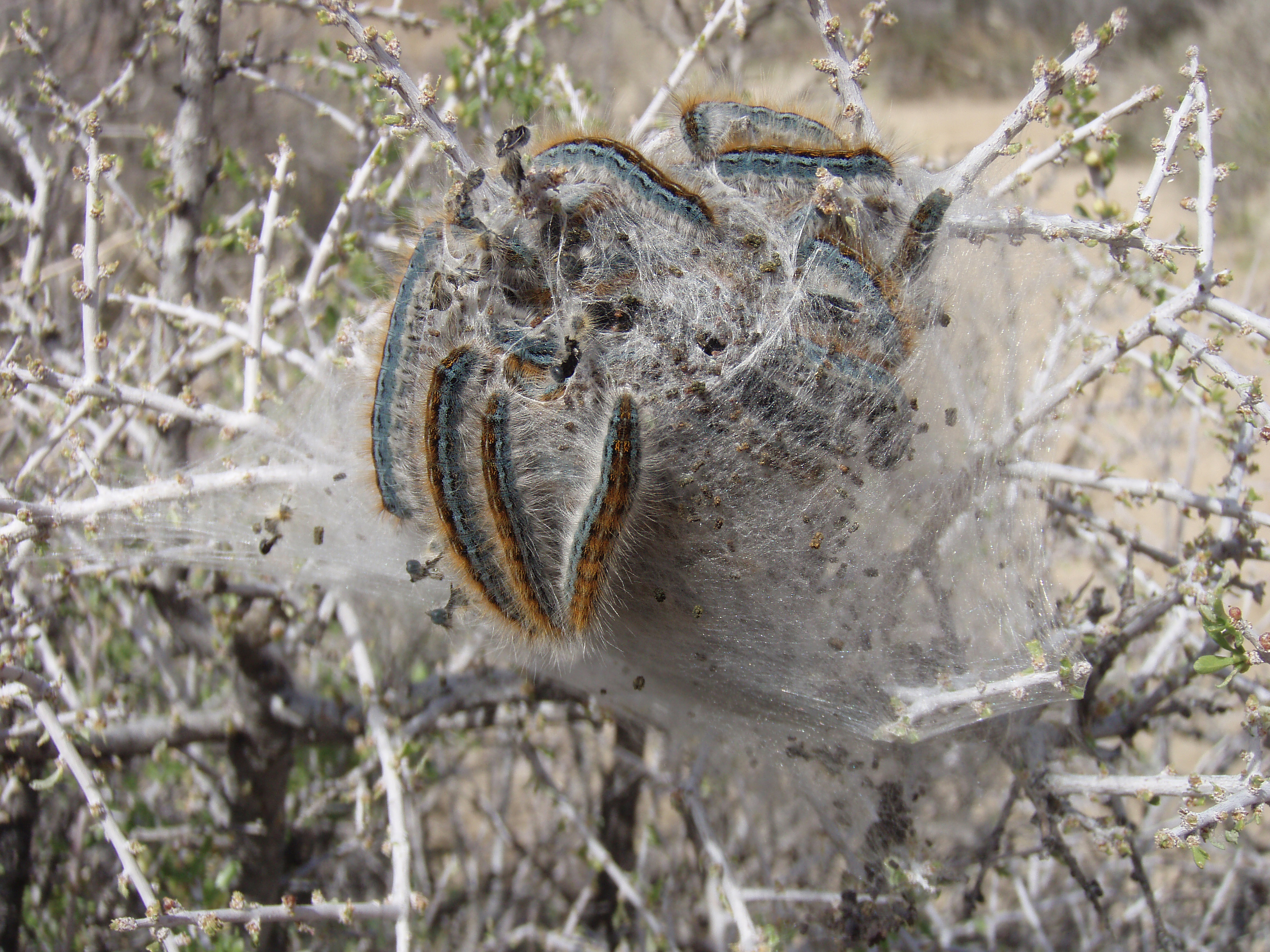
Western tent caterpillars

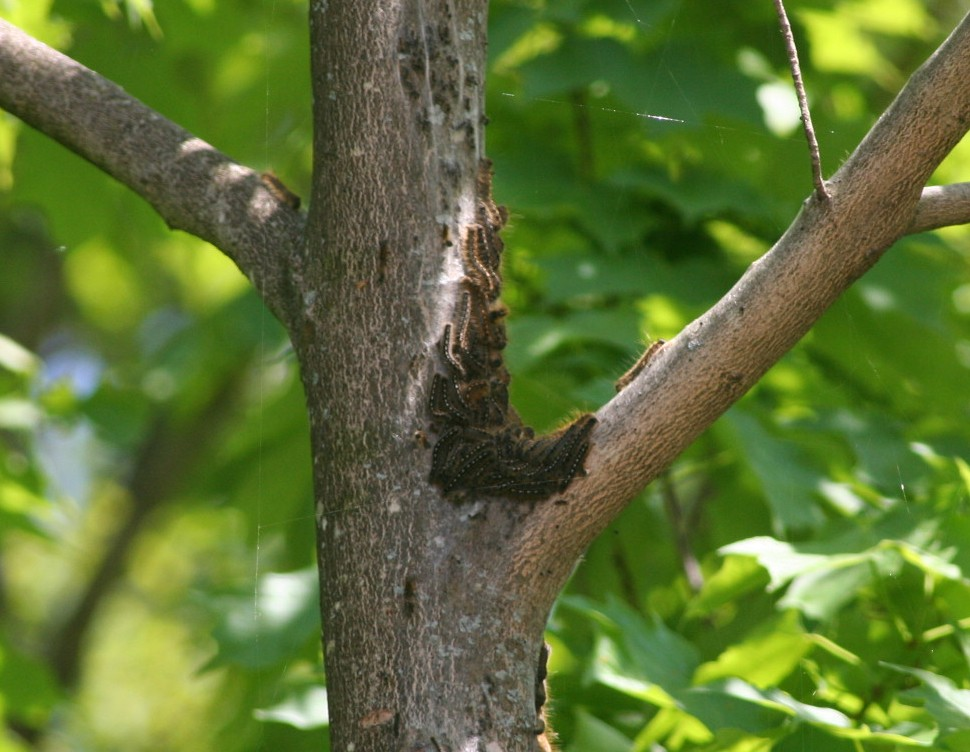
A group of tent caterpillars climbing a tree to eat

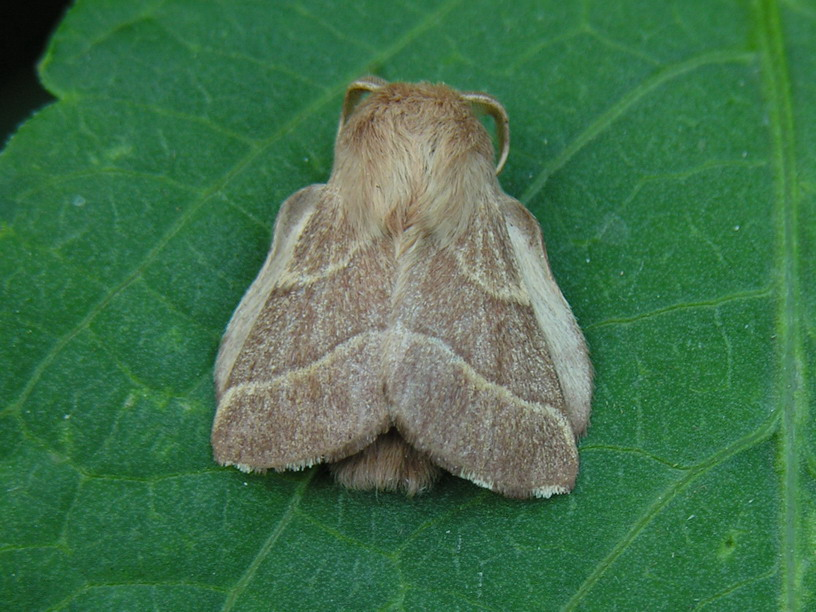
Lackey moth, Malacosoma neustrium

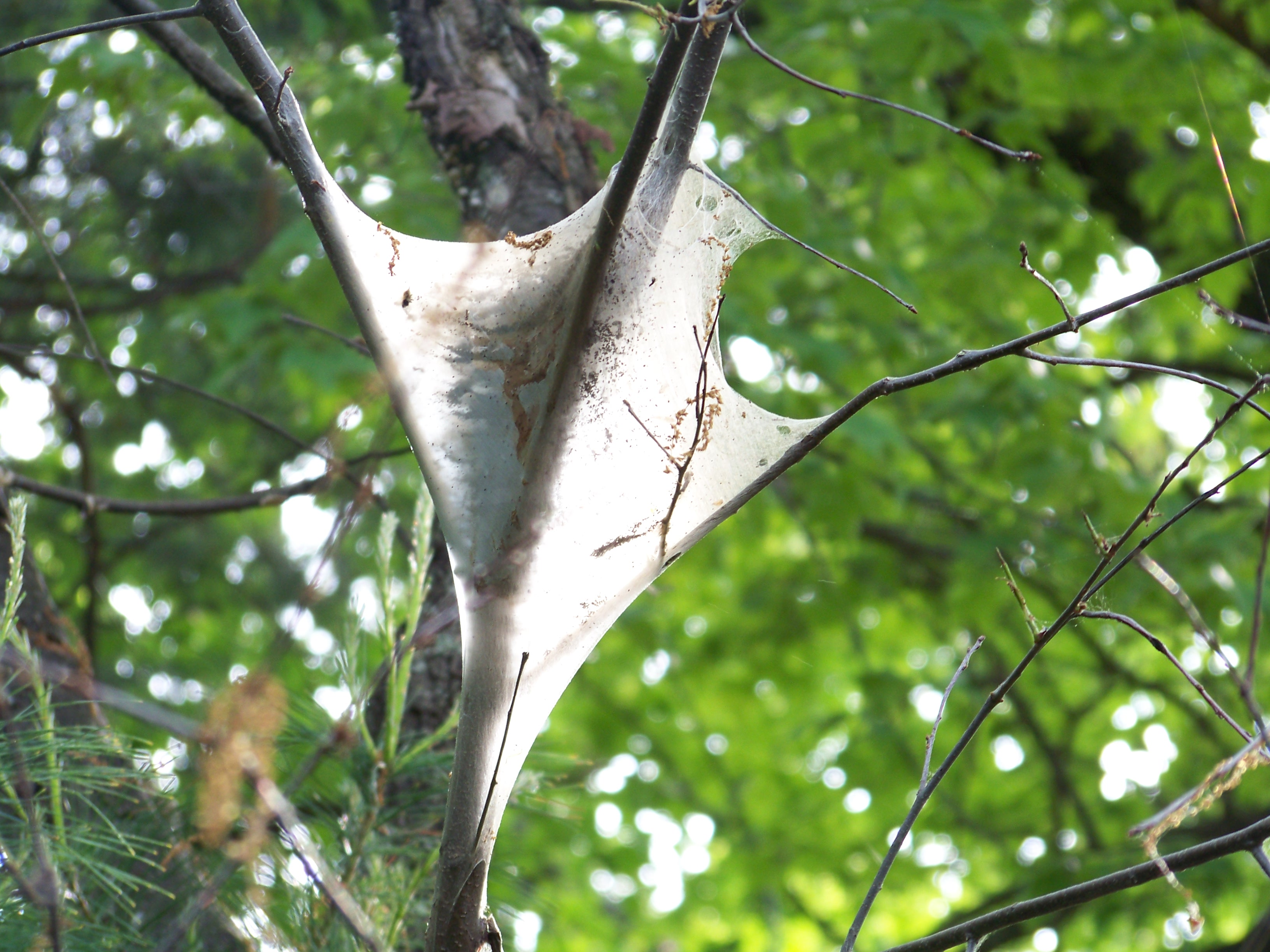
Eastern tent caterpillar tent

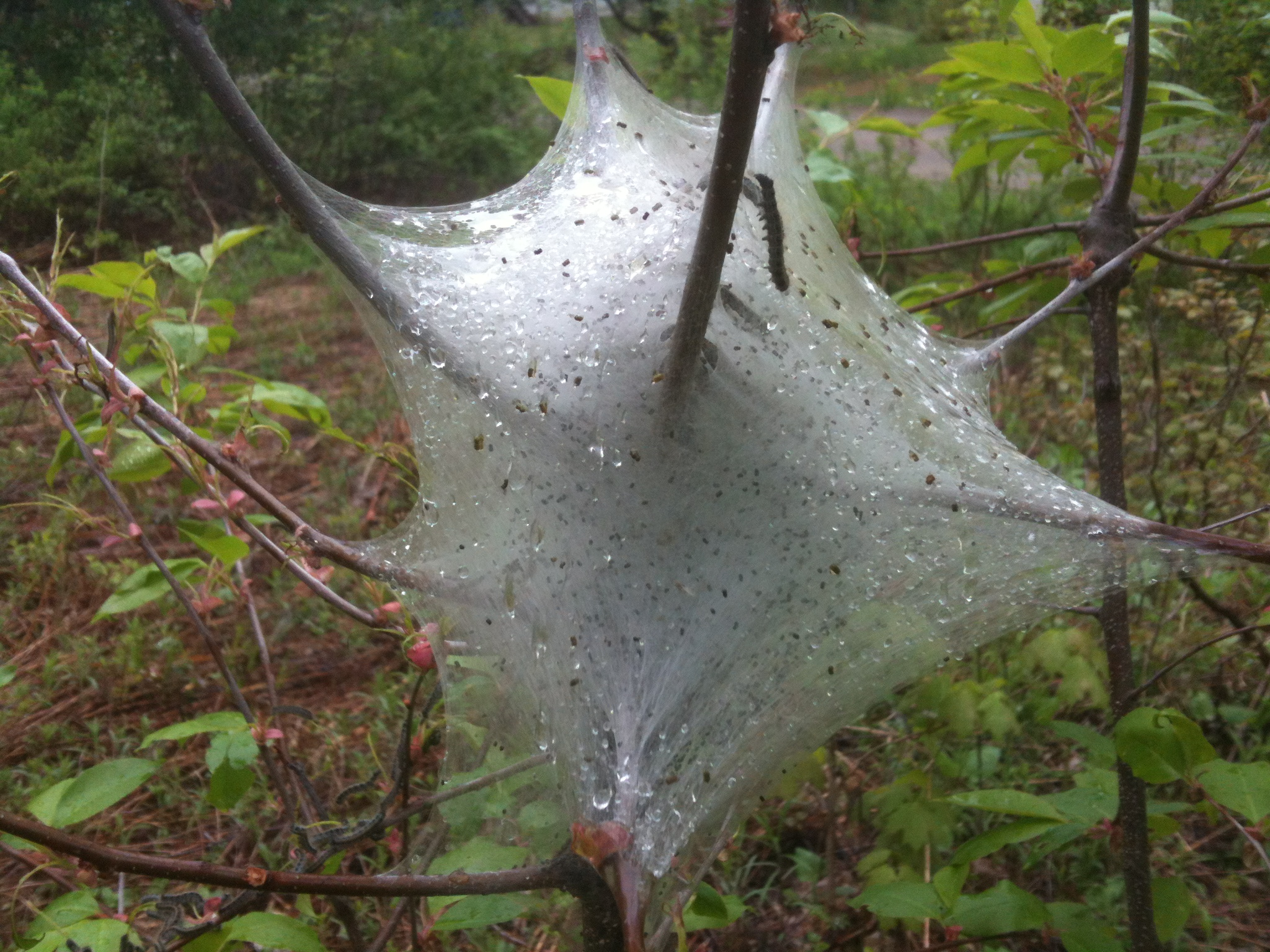
Several tent caterpillars on a nest

A tent caterpillar nest in the UK

== See also ==
- Fall webworm, a North American moth whose caterpillar creates similar webs
