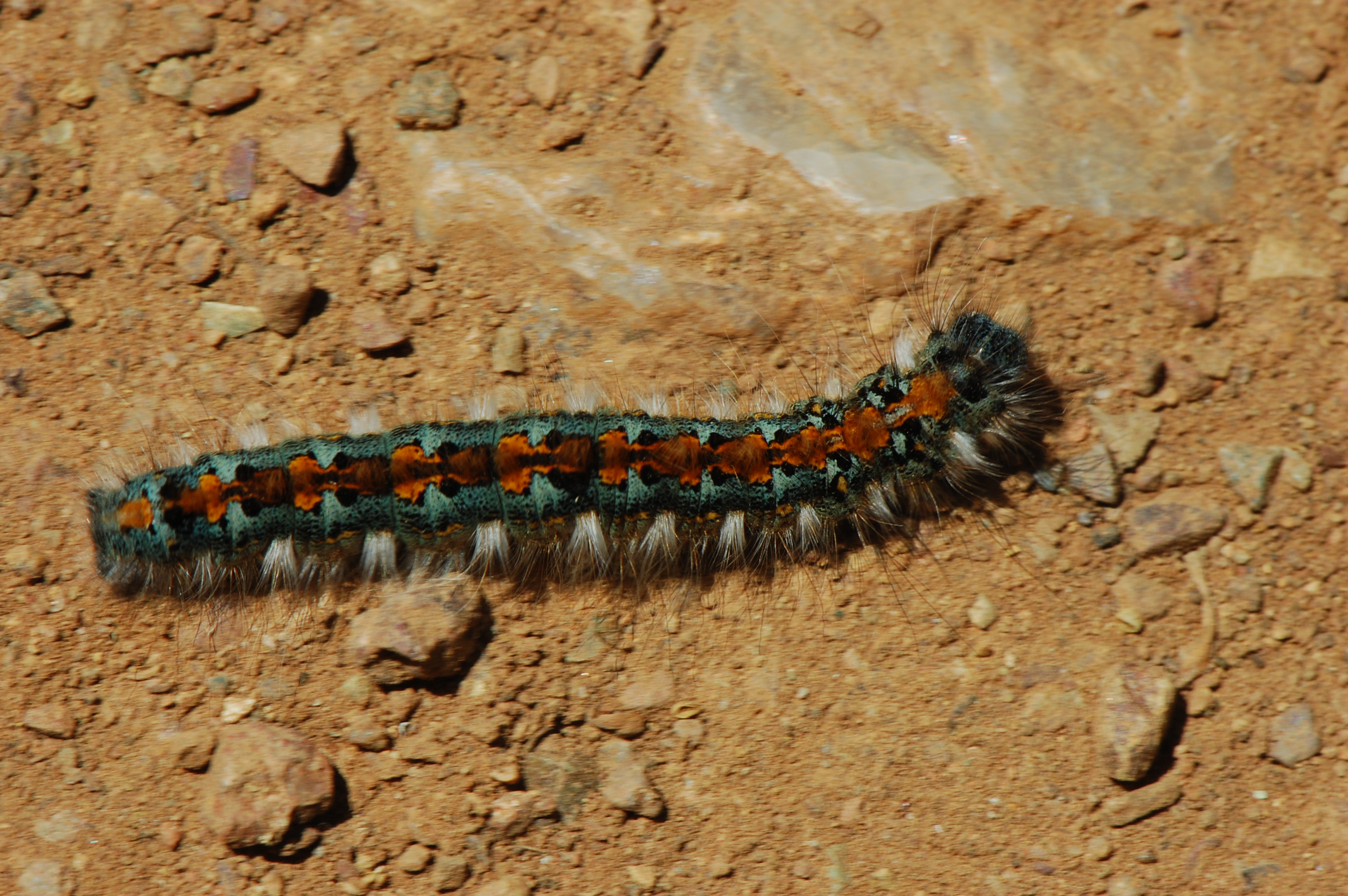

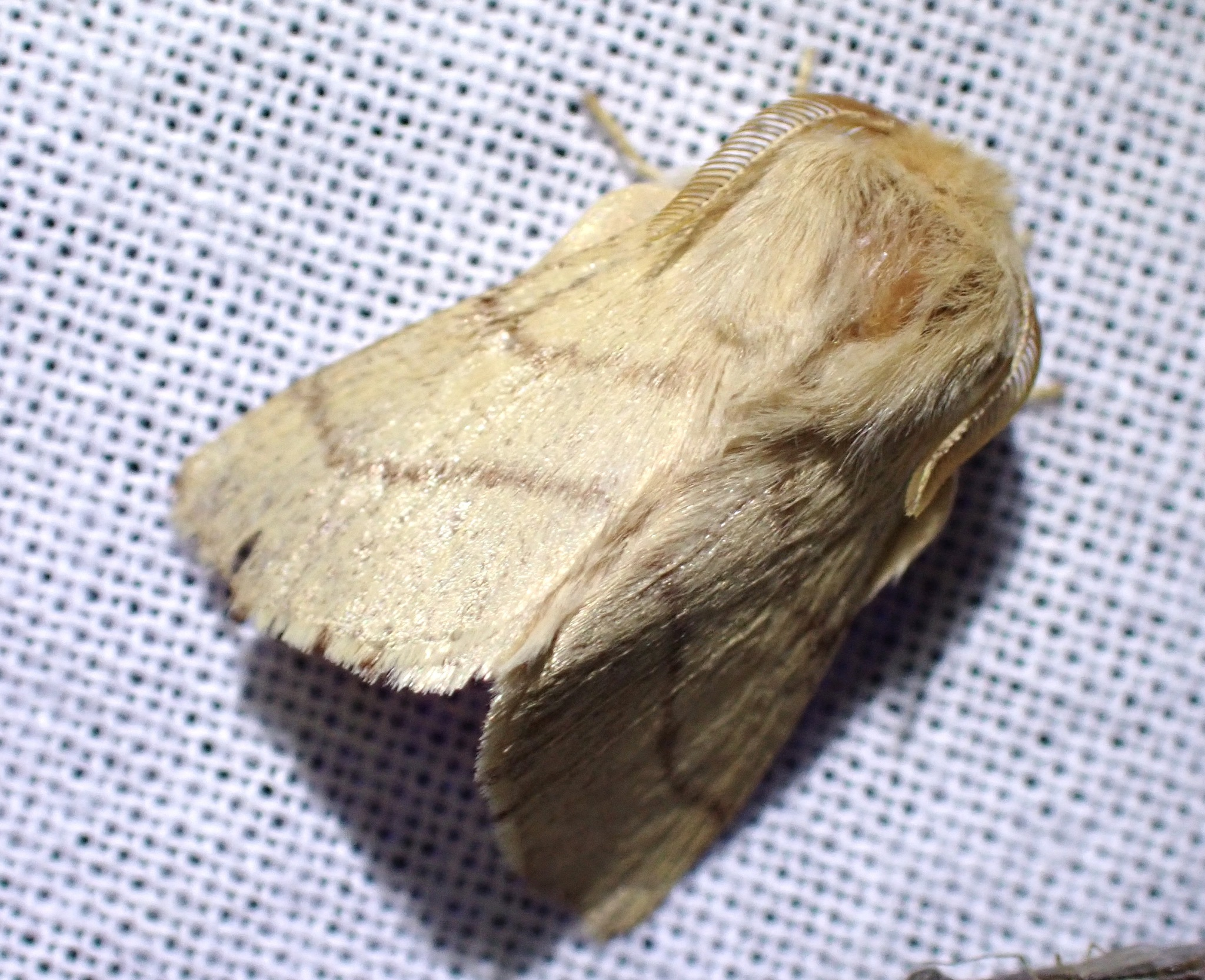
- Malacosoma constricta caterpillar and moth, photographs by California ecologist Cricket Raspet

Scientific classification
- Kingdom: Animalia
- Phylum: Arthropoda
- Class: Insecta
- Order: Lepidoptera
- Family: Lasiocampidae
- Genus: Malacosoma
- Species: M. constricta

Binomial name
- Malacosoma constricta H. Edwards, 1874

= Malacosoma constricta =

Species of moth

Malacosoma constricta, also known as the Pacific tent caterpillar, is a species of moth endemic to North America. Malacosoma constricta is known from California, Oregon, and Washington and is reported only on oaks. In California, subspecies M. constrictum austrinum is found from Santa Barbara County southward; M. constrictum constrictum occurs from Los Angeles County northward.

Larvae feed on leaves, often defoliating affected branches. Pacific tent caterpillars spin rudimentary tents that can be up to 10 cm (3.9 in) wide. The larvae feed in groups outside the tent, entering it only to molt. Pacific tent caterpillars have speckles on the sides, orange hairs on top and grayish or cream colored hairs on the sides. The head is dark blue. Eggs, laid along sticks in clumps, are golden yellow.

According to the U.S. Forest Service, "Other than obvious aesthetic impacts, tent caterpillars typically do not cause major damage on California oaks. When present in high numbers, caterpillars may be a nuisance." Western tent caterpillars and forest tent caterpillars are also present in California oak woodlands.
