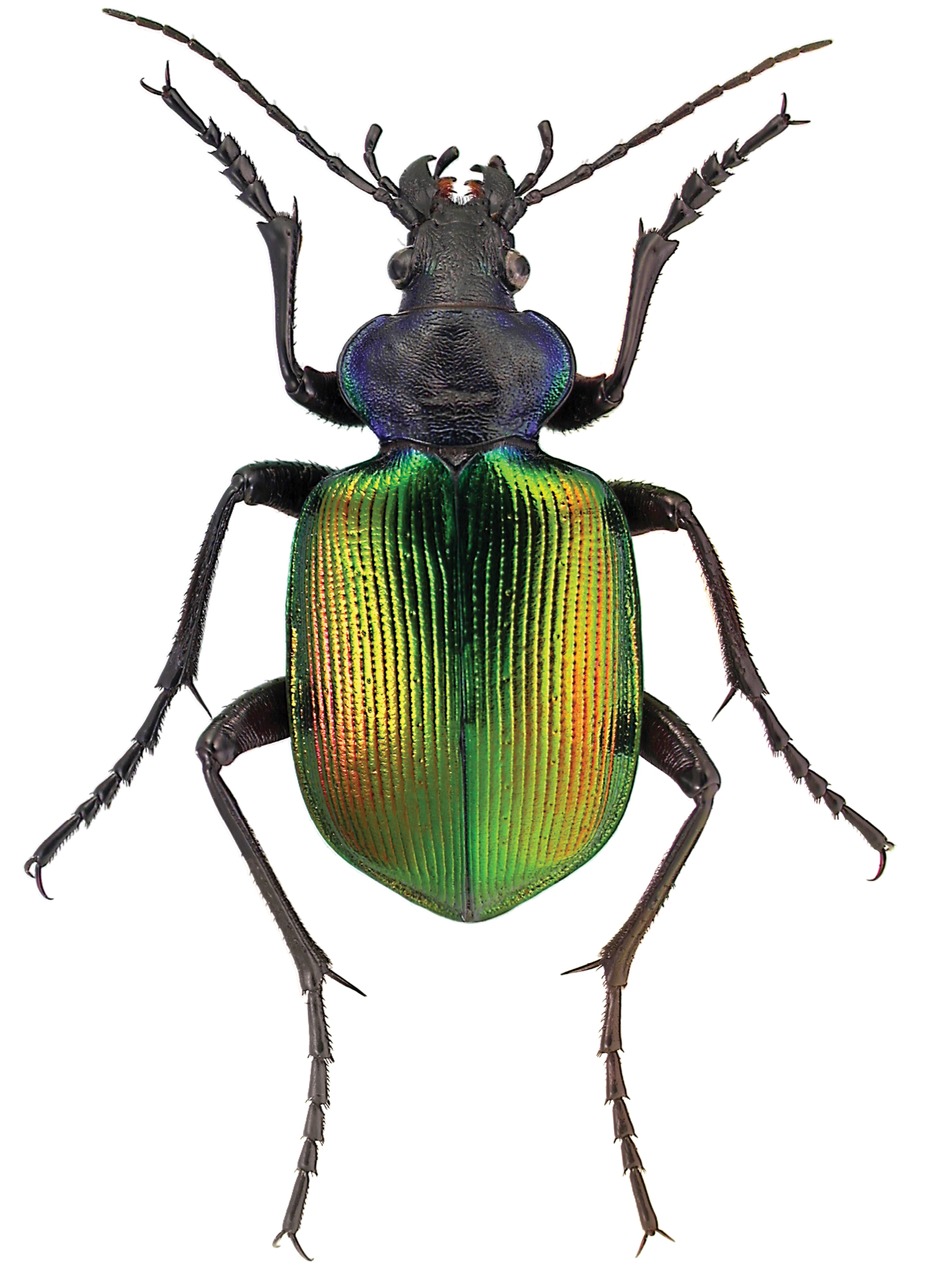
- Calosoma sycophanta (Linnaeus).

Scientific classification
- Kingdom: Animalia
- Phylum: Arthropoda
- Clade: Pancrustacea
- Class: Insecta
- Order: Coleoptera
- Suborder: Adephaga
- Family: Carabidae
- Genus: Calosoma
- Species: C. semilaeve

Binomial name
- Calosoma semilaeve LeConte, 1851

Synonyms
- Calosoma adjutor Casey, 1920; Calosoma davidsoni Casey, 1914

= Calosoma semilaeve =

Species of beetle

Calosoma semilaeve, the black calosoma or semi-smooth beautiful black searcher, is a species of ground beetle in the subfamily Carabinae. It was described by John Lawrence LeConte in 1851. This species is found in Mexico (Baja California) and the United States (Arizona, California, Idaho, Oregon, Utah), where it inhabits cultivated fields and road sides.

Adults are diurnal and nocturnal and prey on caterpillars (including those of Peridroma saucia and Malacosoma incurvum), as well as tenebrionids, elaterids and carabids. Adults overwinter in cavities in the ground.
