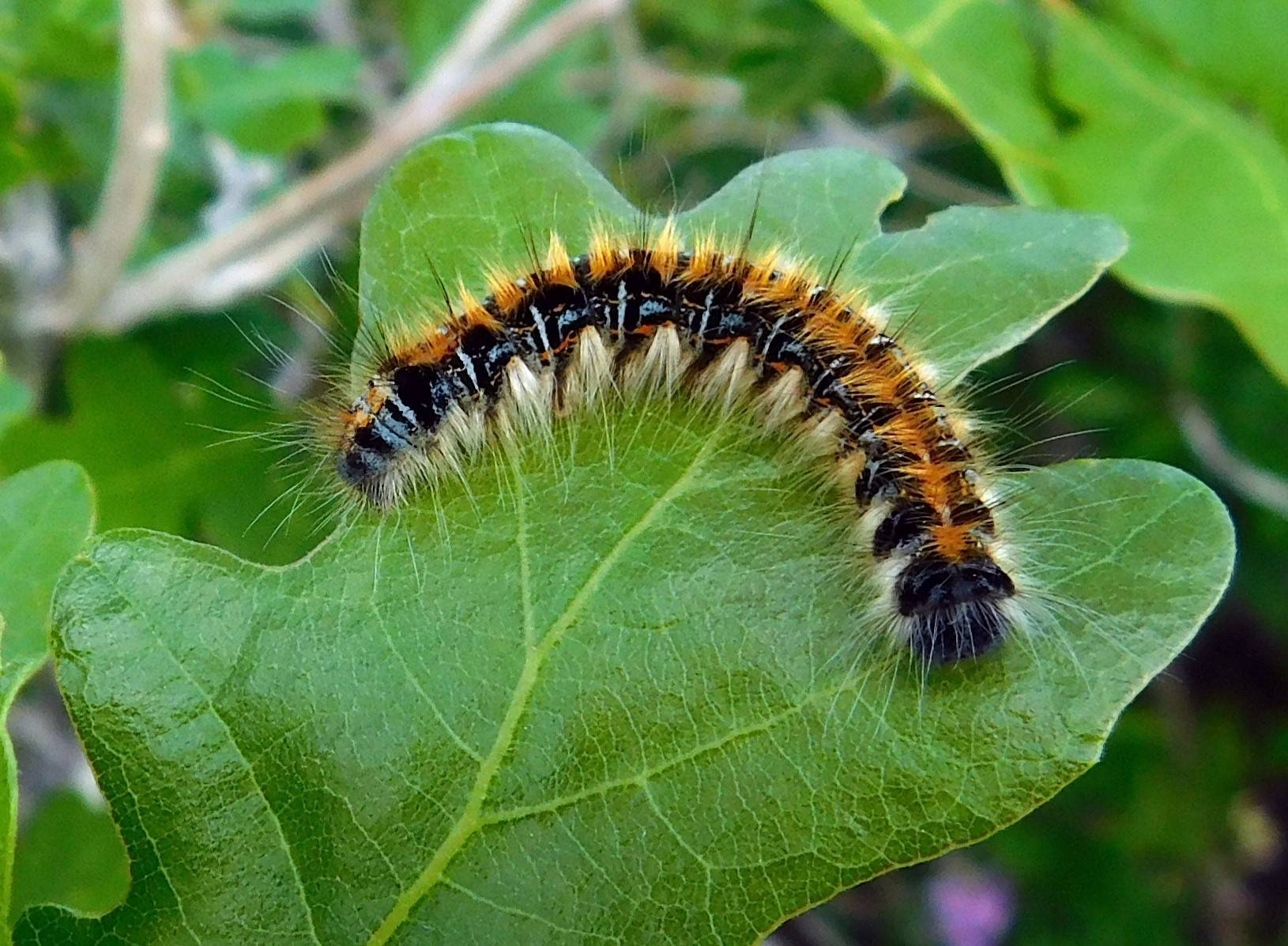

Scientific classification
- Domain: Eukaryota
- Kingdom: Animalia
- Phylum: Arthropoda
- Class: Insecta
- Order: Lepidoptera
- Family: Lasiocampidae
- Genus: Malacosoma
- Species: M. tigris

Binomial name
- Malacosoma tigris Dyar, 1902

= Malacosoma tigris =

Species of insect

Malacosoma tigris, the sonoran tent caterpillar, is a species of insect in the moth family Lasiocampidae.

The MONA or Hodges number for Malacosoma tigris is 7700.
