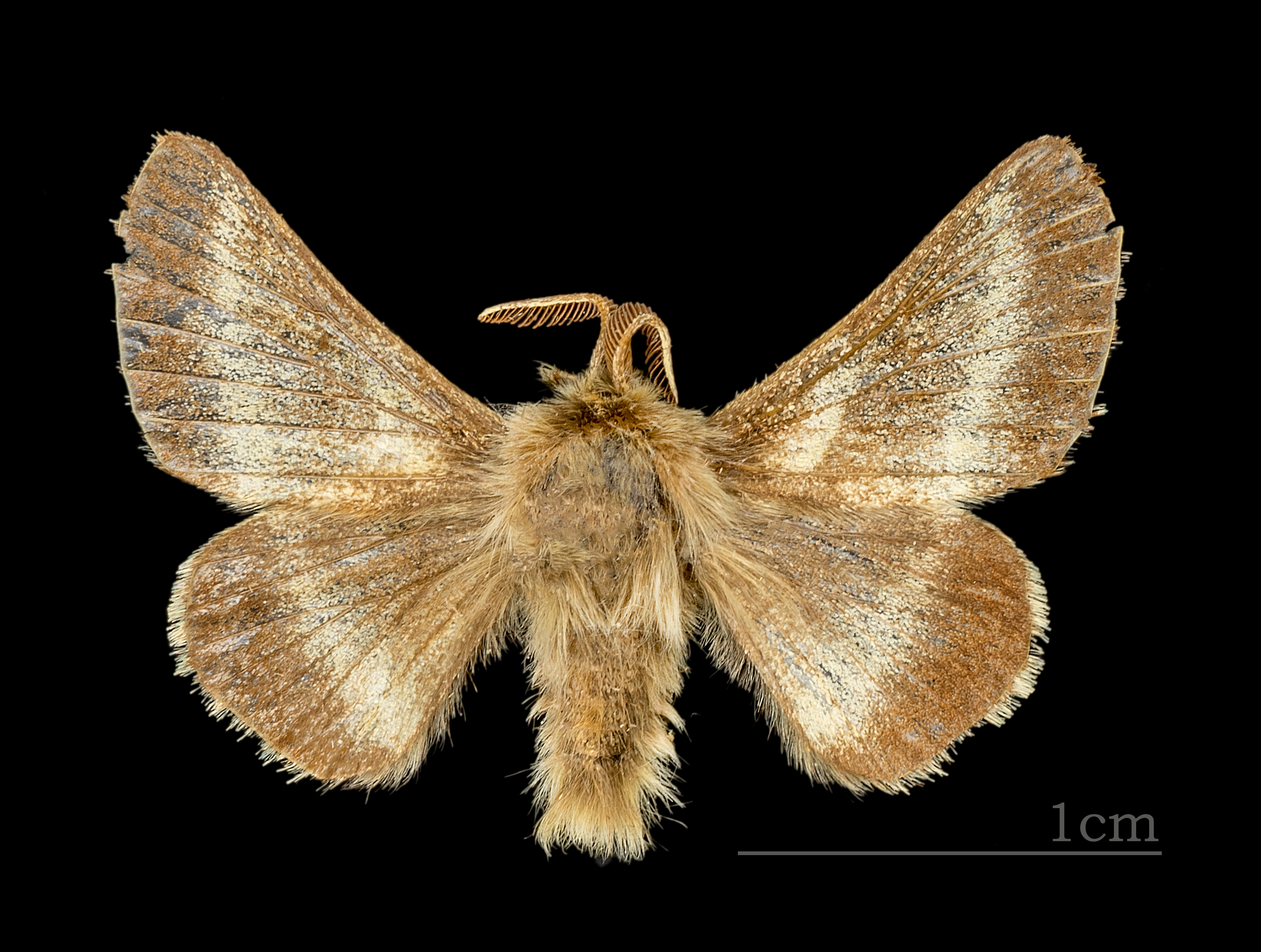
- Malacosoma alpicolum - Male

Scientific classification
- Domain: Eukaryota
- Kingdom: Animalia
- Phylum: Arthropoda
- Class: Insecta
- Order: Lepidoptera
- Family: Lasiocampidae
- Genus: Malacosoma
- Species: M. alpicolum

Binomial name
- Malacosoma alpicolum Staudinger, 1870

= Malacosoma alpicolum =

Species of moth

Malacosoma alpicolum (also, M. alpicola) is a moth of the family Lasiocampidae, the snout moths. It is native to the southern and central Alps.

The wingspan is 18–34 mm. The moth flies from July to August.

The larvae feed on various plants, including roses, common blackberry, Alchemilla alpina, Potentilla aurea, Filipendula ulmaria, and Euphorbia cyparissias.

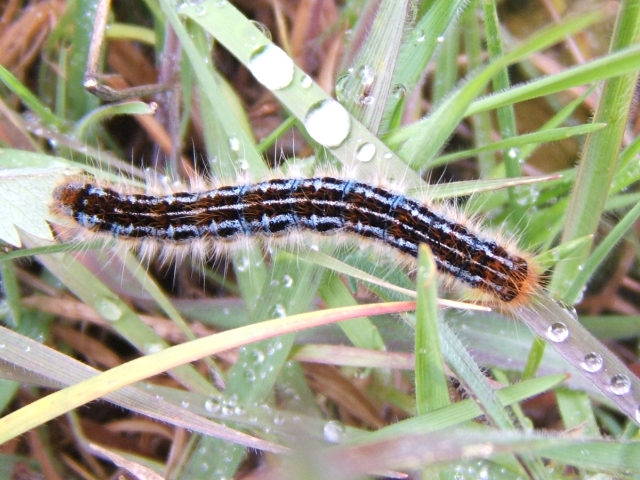
Larva

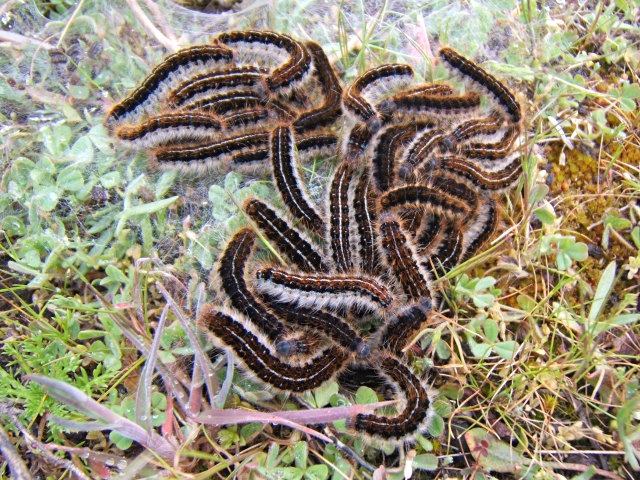

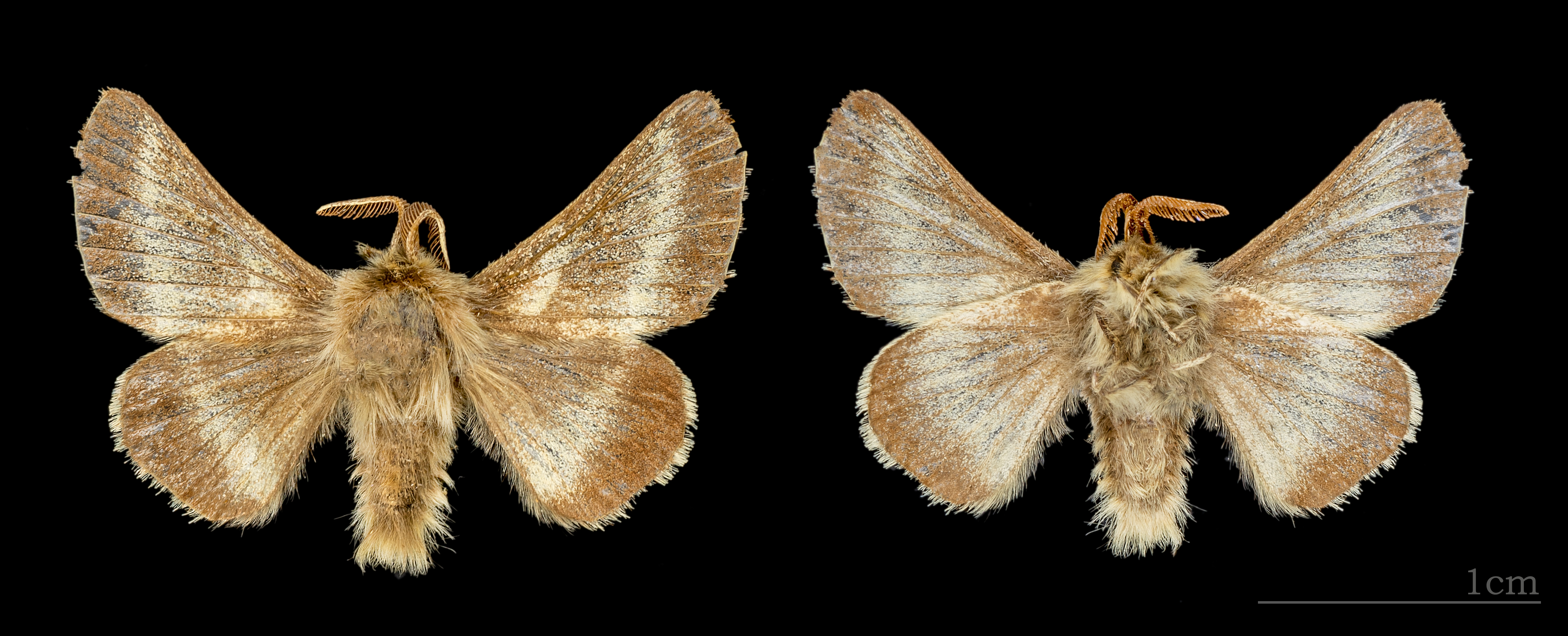
Both sides of male specimen MHNT

== Subspecies ==
- Malacosoma alpicolum alpicolum
- Malacosoma alpicolum mixtum (Morocco)Rothschild, 1925
