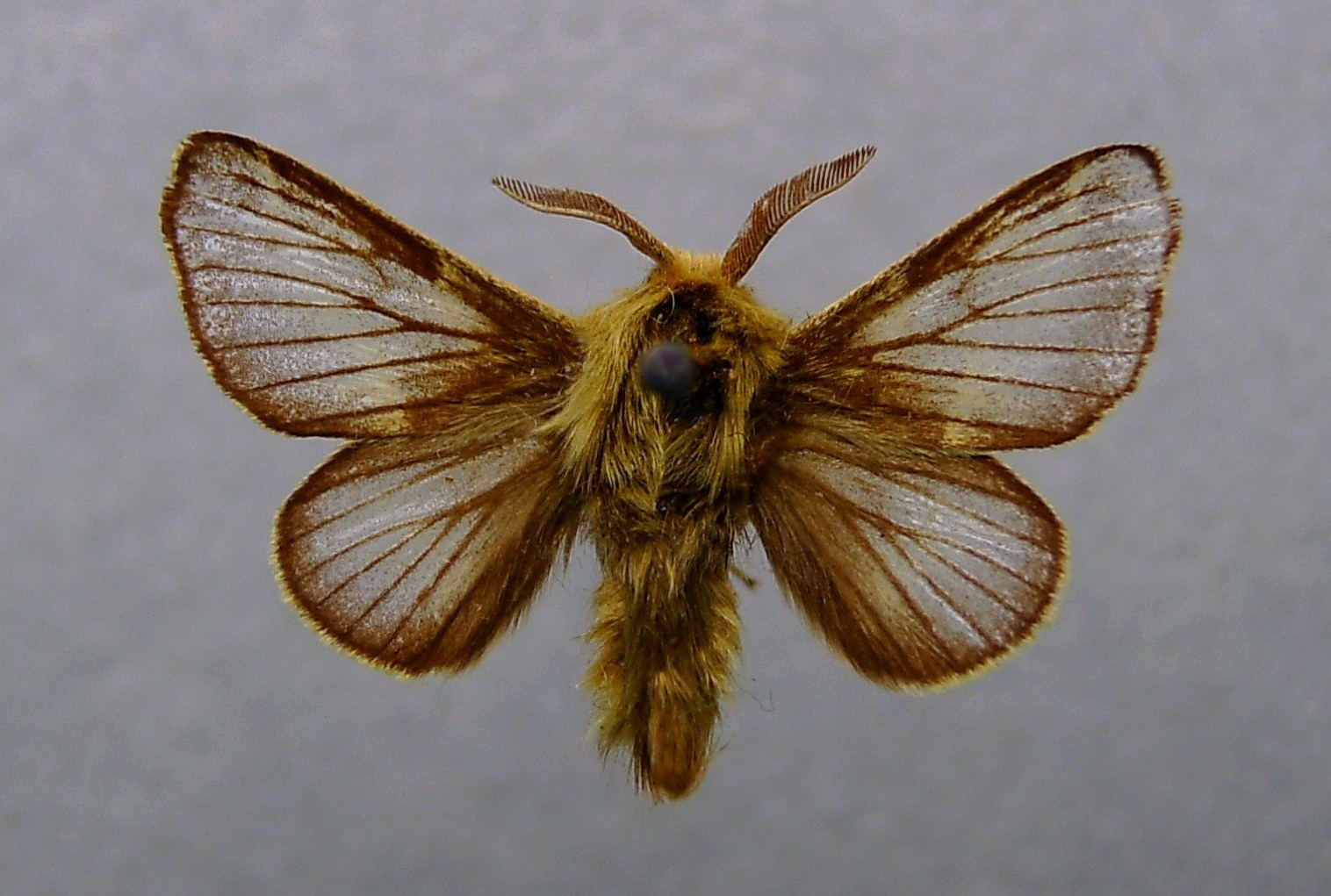
- Adult male

Scientific classification
- Domain: Eukaryota
- Kingdom: Animalia
- Phylum: Arthropoda
- Class: Insecta
- Order: Lepidoptera
- Family: Lasiocampidae
- Genus: Malacosoma
- Species: M. franconicum

Binomial name
- Malacosoma franconicum (Denis & Schiffermüller, 1775)

Synonyms
- Bombyx franconica Denis & Schiffermüller, 1775; Malacosoma franconica; Malacosoma dorycnii (Millière, 1864); Malacosoma panormitana Turati, 1909; Malacosoma calabricum Stauder, 1921; Malacosoma joannisi Viette, 1965

= Malacosoma franconicum =

Species of moth

Malacosoma franconicum is a moth of the family Lasiocampidae first described by Michael Denis and Ignaz Schiffermüller in 1775. It is found in central and southern Europe, as well as Armenia.

The wingspan is about 22 mm for males and 36 mm for females. Adults are on wing from June to August.

The larvae feed on Artemisia, Achillea, Plantago, Rumex species.

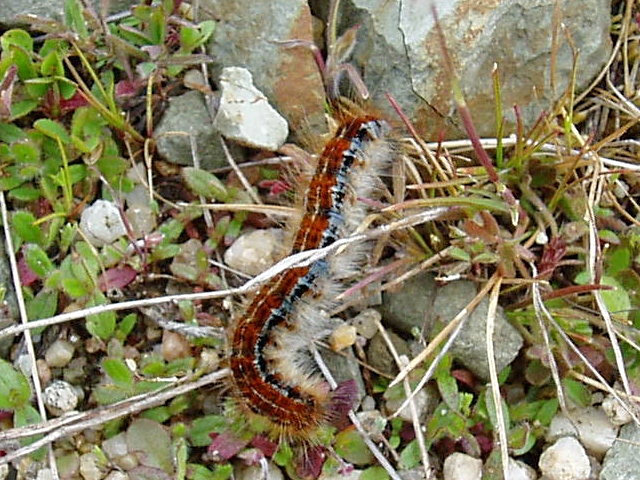
Caterpillar

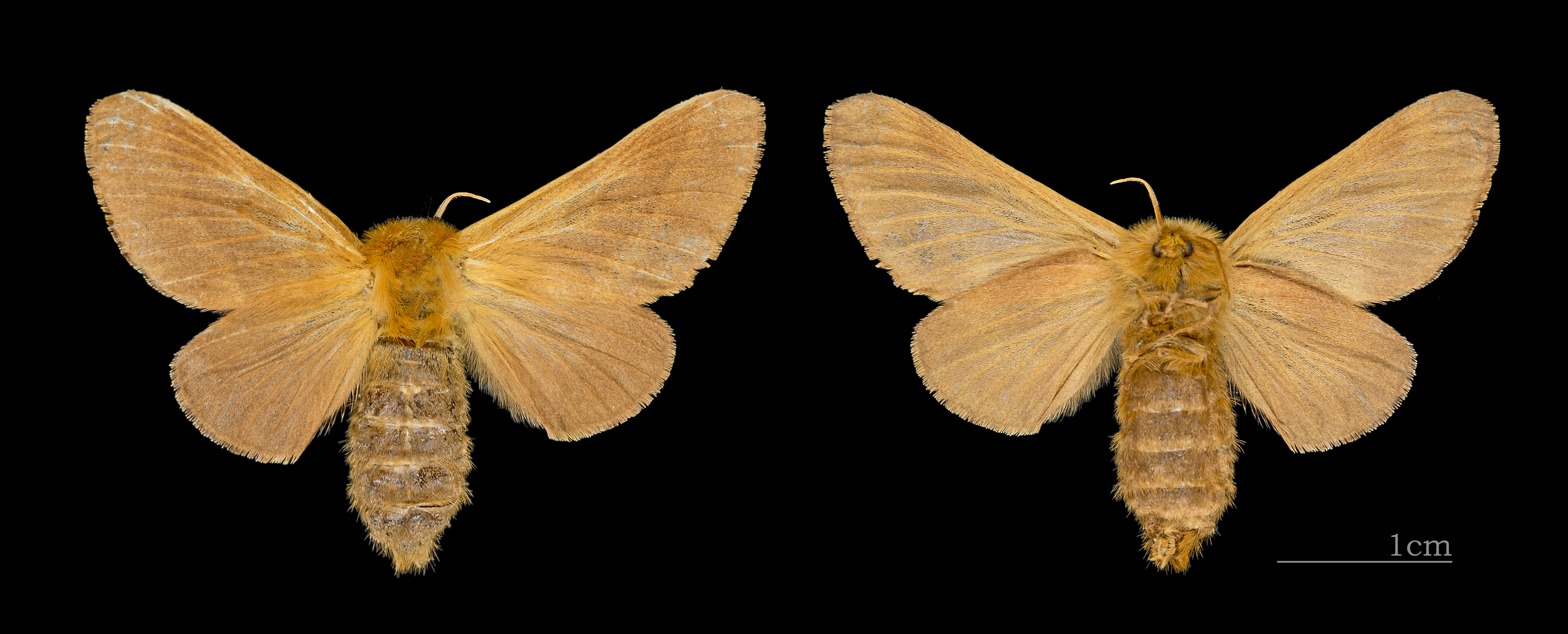
Female - both sides - MHNT
