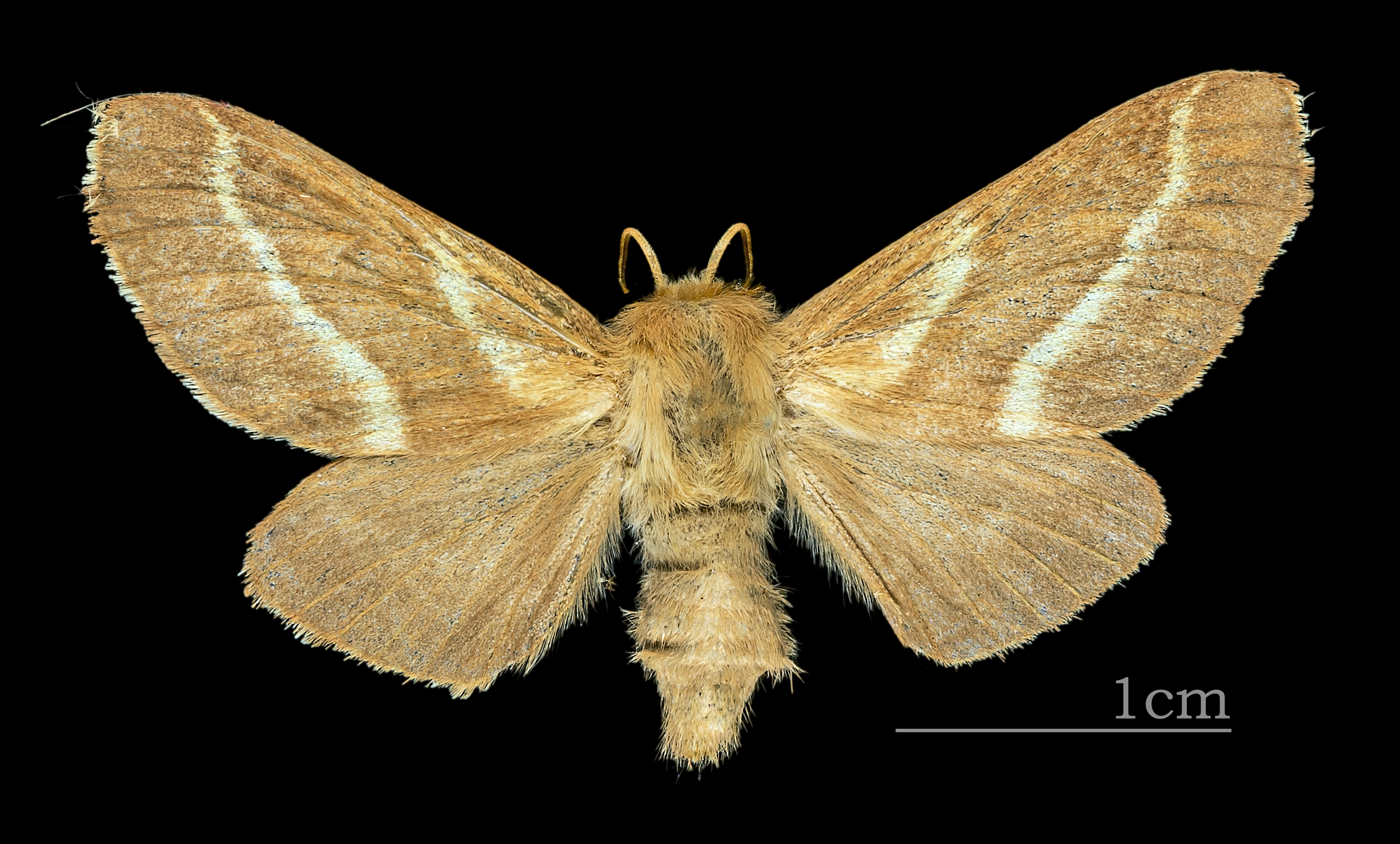

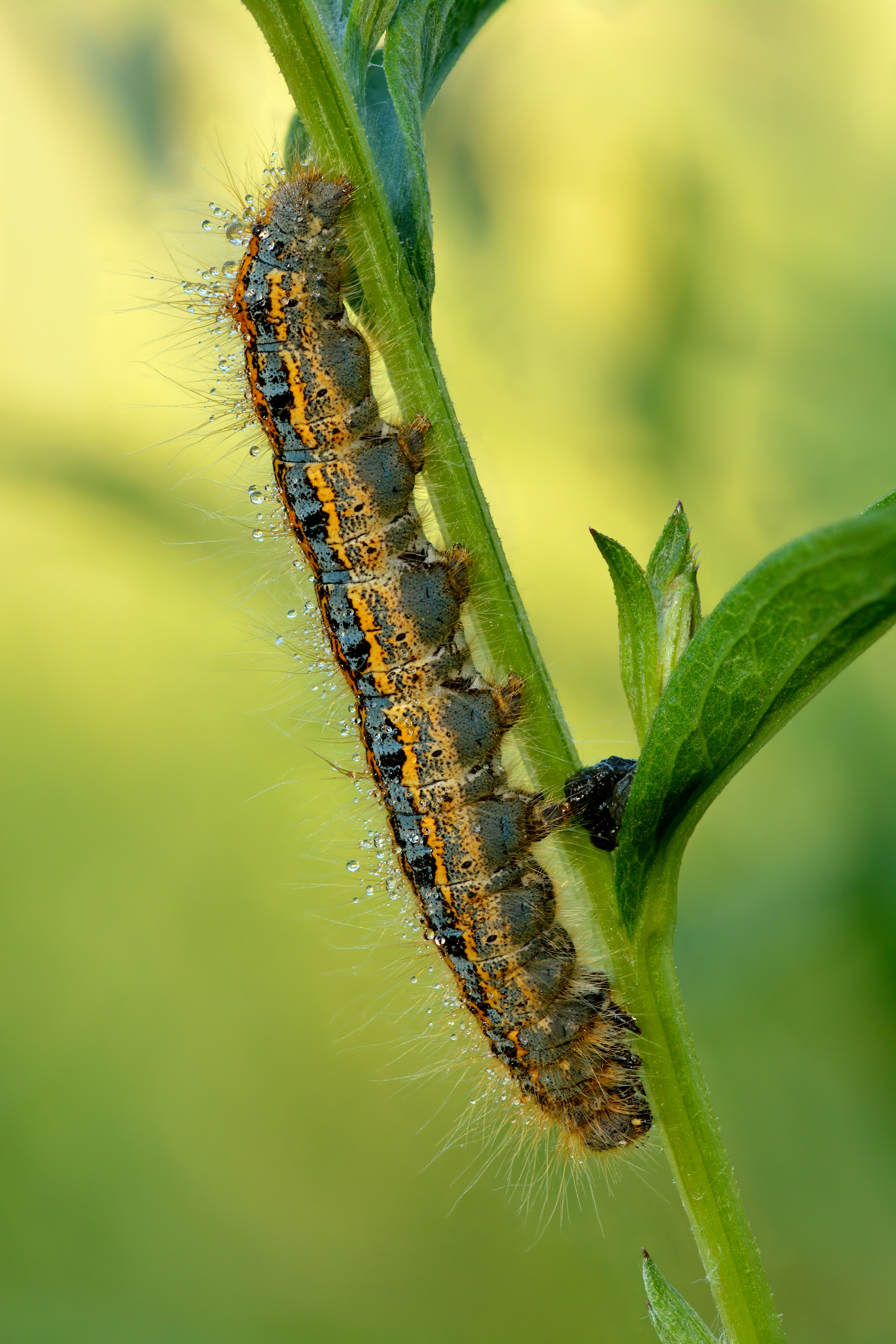
- Larvae

Scientific classification
- Kingdom: Animalia
- Phylum: Arthropoda
- Class: Insecta
- Order: Lepidoptera
- Family: Lasiocampidae
- Genus: Malacosoma
- Species: M. castrense

Binomial name
- Malacosoma castrense (Linnaeus, 1758)

Synonyms
- Malacosoma castrensis; Malacosoma tianshanica Daniel, 1949; Phalaena castrensis Linnaeus, 1758

= Malacosoma castrense =

Ground lackey

Species of moth

Malacosoma castrense (or Malacosoma castrensis in the original spelling), the ground lackey, is a moth of the family Lasiocampidae. It is a tent caterpillar found in Europe. The species was first described by Carl Linnaeus in his 1758 10th edition of Systema Naturae. The moth's habitats are salt marshes and estuaries.

== Distribution and habitat ==
The habitat is salt marsh and estuary. It is not particularly common due to this specialist habitat, but neither is it a threatened species.

== Life cycle and behaviour ==
Eggs are laid in rings around plant stalks, and can survive immersion in salt water. The blue-grey larvae feed on various shrubs and herbaceous plants such as heather, cypress spurge, and Lotus species, and other plants found in their habitat except grasses, but they can be fed apple or hawthorn foliage in captivity. The ground lackey larva is a tent caterpillar. which makes a new tent with each moult. Fully-grown caterpillars are fast walkers. The pupa is not cocooned.

Adults fly from June to August, depending on the location. The length of the forewings is 13–16 mm for males and 17–21 mm for females. They fly at night.

== Subspecies ==
- Malacosoma castrense castrense
- Malacosoma castrense kirghisicum (Staudinger, 1879) (Asia Minor, Kazakhstan, Turkmenia, Uzbekistan)
- Malacosoma castrense thomalae Gaede, 1932 (Tien-Shan)
