= Cirphis (Phocis) =

Town in ancient Phocis, Greece

Cirphis or Kirphis (Ancient Greek: Κίρφις) was a town in ancient Phocis. Strabo describes a mountain named Cirphis above Delphi and near Parnassus. Stephen of Byzantium is the only ancient author mentioning the place, albeit in the form Scirphae or Skirphai (Σκίρφαι), notes its status as a polis (city-state), and cites Diokidas for the demonym, Σκίρφιος, a historian of the 4th century BCE. The demonym Σκιρφαîος is preserved in a fragment of the writings of this historian.
