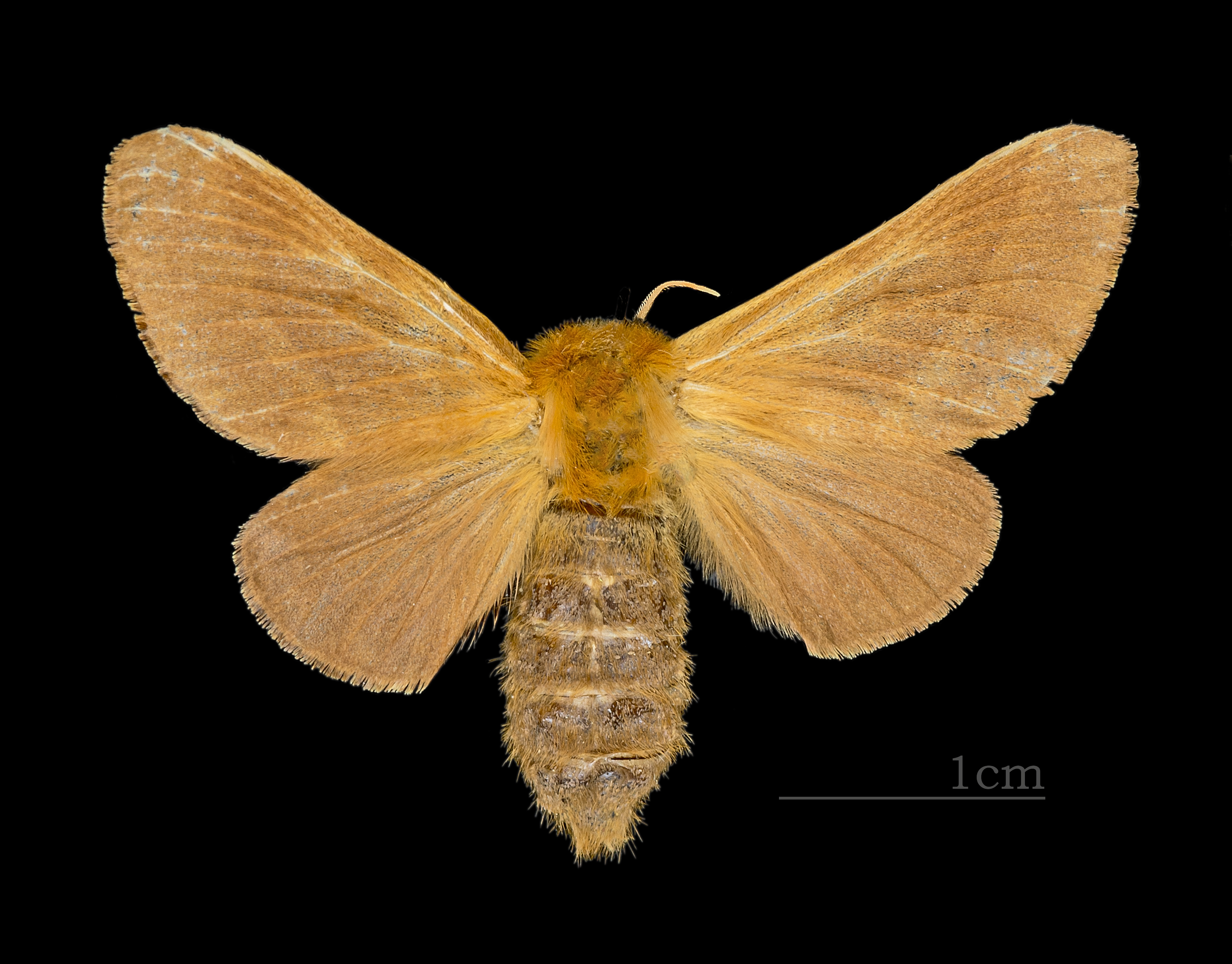
- Malacosoma franconicum

Scientific classification
- Kingdom: Animalia
- Phylum: Arthropoda
- Clade: Pancrustacea
- Class: Insecta
- Order: Lepidoptera
- Family: Lasiocampidae
- Subfamily: Lasiocampinae
- Tribe: Lasiocampini
- Genus: Malacosoma; Hübner, [1820]

Synonyms
- Trichoda Hübner, [1806]; Trichoda Hübner, 1822; Trichodia Stephens, 1827; Clisiocampa Curtis, 1828; Cliseocampa Agassiz, 1847

= Malacosoma =

Genus of moths

Malacosoma is a genus of moth in the family Lasiocampidae first described by Jacob Hübner in 1820. The larva is commonly called the Tent caterpillar.

== Species ==
- Malacosoma alpicolum (Staudinger, 1870)
- Malacosoma americanum (Fabricius, 1793)
- Malacosoma californicum (Packard, 1864)
- Malacosoma castrense (Linnaeus, 1758)
- Malacosoma constricta (=constrictum) (H. Edwards, 1874)
- Malacosoma disstria (Hübner, [1820])
- Malacosoma franconicum (Denis & Schiffermüller, 1775)
- Malacosoma incurva (H. Edwards, 1882)
- Malacosoma laurae (Lajonquuière, 1977)
- Malacosoma luteum (Oberthür, 1878)
- Malacosoma neustria (Linnaeus, 1758)
- Malacosoma parallellum (Staudinger, 1887)
- Malacosoma primum (Staudinger, 1887)
- Malacosoma tigris (Dyar, 1902)
