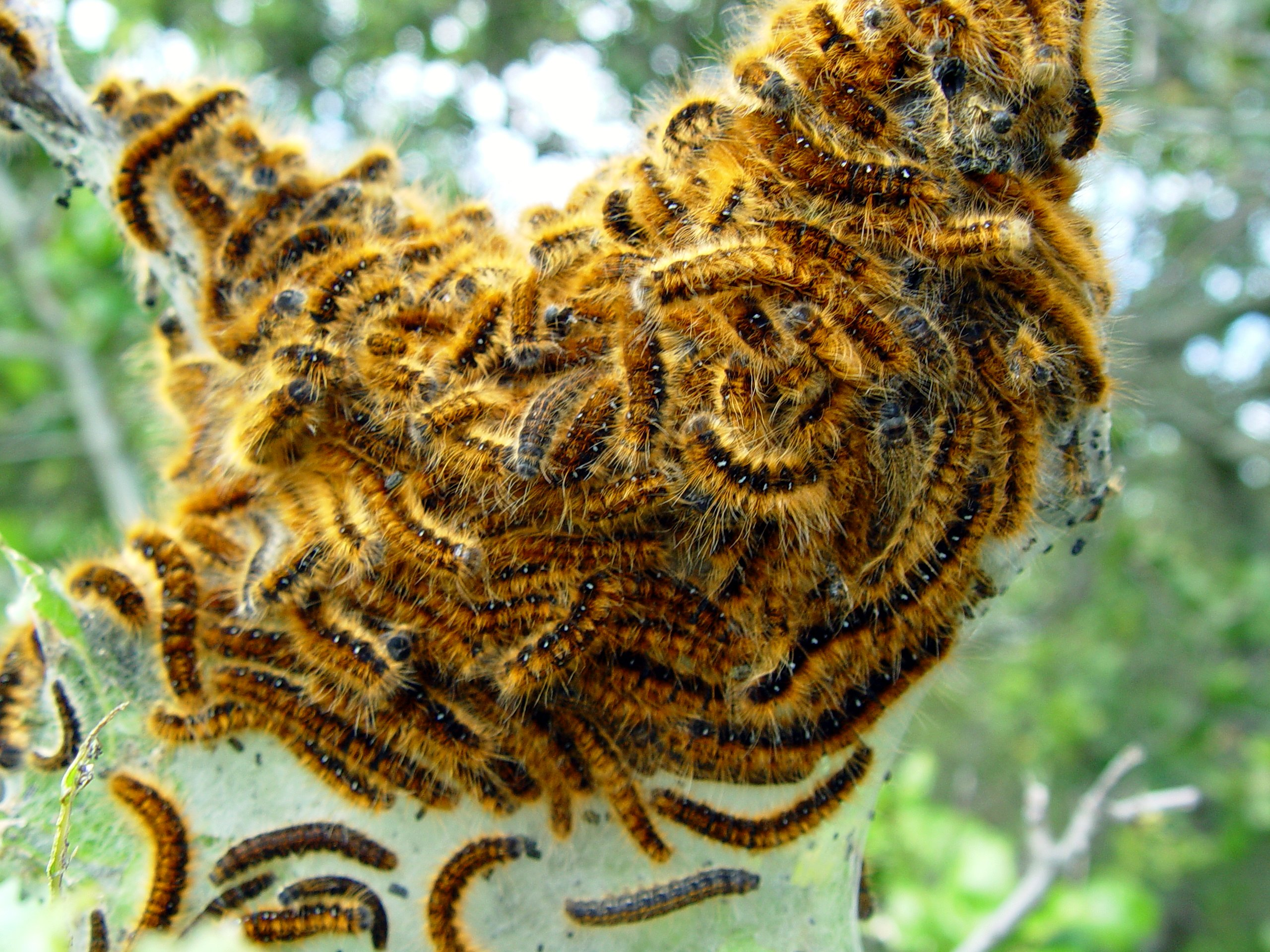
- larvae
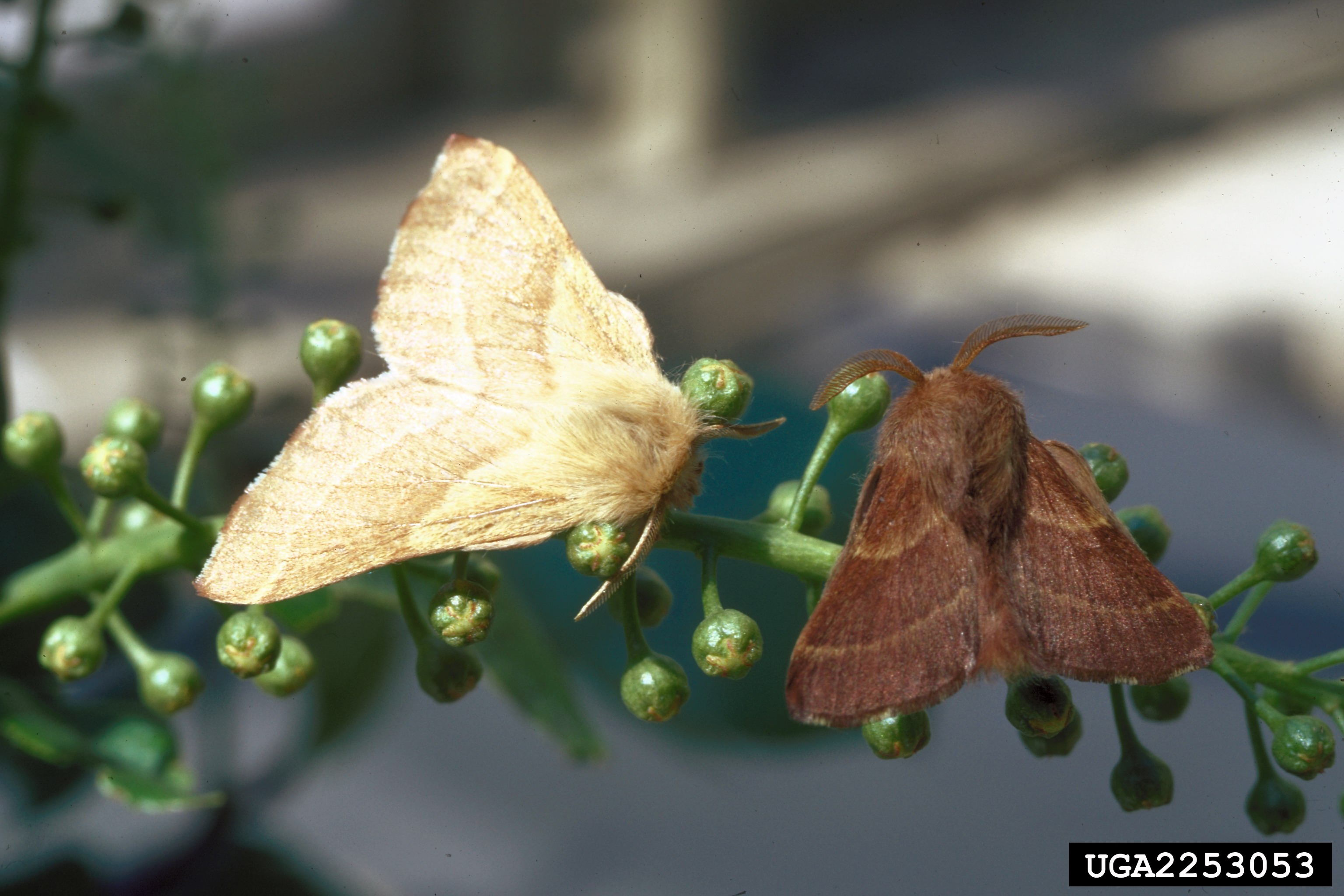
- Adult

Scientific classification
- Kingdom: Animalia
- Phylum: Arthropoda
- Clade: Pancrustacea
- Class: Insecta
- Order: Lepidoptera
- Family: Lasiocampidae
- Genus: Malacosoma
- Species: M. californicum

Binomial name
- Malacosoma californicum Packard, 1864

Synonyms
- Clisiocampa californica Packard, [1865]; Clisiocampa californica Walker, 1865; Bombyx pseudoneustria Boisduval, 1868; Clisiocampa thoracica Stretch, 1881; Clisiocampa fragilis var. perlutea Neumoegen & Dyar, 1893; Clisiocampa ambisimile Dyar, 1893; Clisiocampa pluvialis Dyar, 1893; Clisiocampa fragilis Stretch, 1881; Clisiocampa mus Neumoegen, 1893

= Malacosoma californicum =

Western tent caterpillar

Species of insect

Malacosoma californicum, the western tent caterpillar, is a moth of the family Lasiocampidae. It is a tent caterpillar. The Western Tent Caterpillar is found in southern Canada, the western United States, and parts of northern Mexico. There are currently six recognized subspecies of M. californicum. Western tent caterpillars are gregarious and will spend a large portion of their time with other caterpillars in silken tents constructed during their larval stage.

Western tent caterpillars are univoltine, going through a single generation per year. Adults emerge in the late summer to copulate and lay eggs. Adult moths will preferentially lay their eggs on the sunny side of their host trees. Eggs will lay in diapause over the winter and hatch the following spring. Population sizes of western tent caterpillar can reach outbreak proportions, where populations reach very high numbers and large scale defoliation occurs. Severe outbreaks can cause defoliation of host trees however, damage to trees is minimal and most trees will grow their leaves back quickly.

== Description ==
The mature Western Tent caterpillar pre-pupa is 4-5 centimeters long. The caterpillars are black, grey, or white with an orange stripe running longitudinally across the body. There are blue-white lines on each segment with dispersed setae extruding from the body. Pupae are 2-2.5 centimeters and reddish-brown to black in colour. Pupae spin a white silken cocoon, powdered in white and yellow. Adults have wingspan between 3.5-5 centimeters. Moths are brown, yellow, tan or grey, with two lighter or darker lines crossing the body.

== Biology ==
=== Diet ===
Western tent caterpillar larvae are generalist herbivores, feeding on leaves. However, diet preference is heavily dependent on geographical location. The tree in which a female deposits the eggs is where the larvae will choose to feed. The most common host plants that caterpillars feed on are leaves from stonefruit trees. However, larvae will feed on many other types of tree foliage. Adult moths do not eat and live for 1–4 days.

=== Thermoregulation ===
Western tent caterpillars are ectothermic, therefore they do not produce their own body heat and are heavily influenced by environmental temperatures. Larvae are thought to thermoregulate by basking in the sun and staying in close groups to elevate body temperature. Increasing body temperature helps accelerate development time of caterpillars.

=== Behaviour ===
Early instar caterpillars are gregarious and remain as a family in silken tents. Aggregations of caterpillars help discourage predation, increase temperature, and facilitate foraging. During late instars, caterpillars get larger and require more food resulting in more solitary behaviour. Whereas early instars will feed socially, using pheromones to direct others to food, during the final instar caterpillars begin to forage independently. Caterpillars flick their heads in response to the sound of fly parasites, as a defensive mechanism.

=== Reproduction ===
Moths will mate in mid-summer. Male-male competition will ensue for females. Females are polyandrous and lay a clutch of eggs sired by multiple males. A single band of eggs is laid around the circumference of the branch. A single egg band can contain hundreds of eggs.

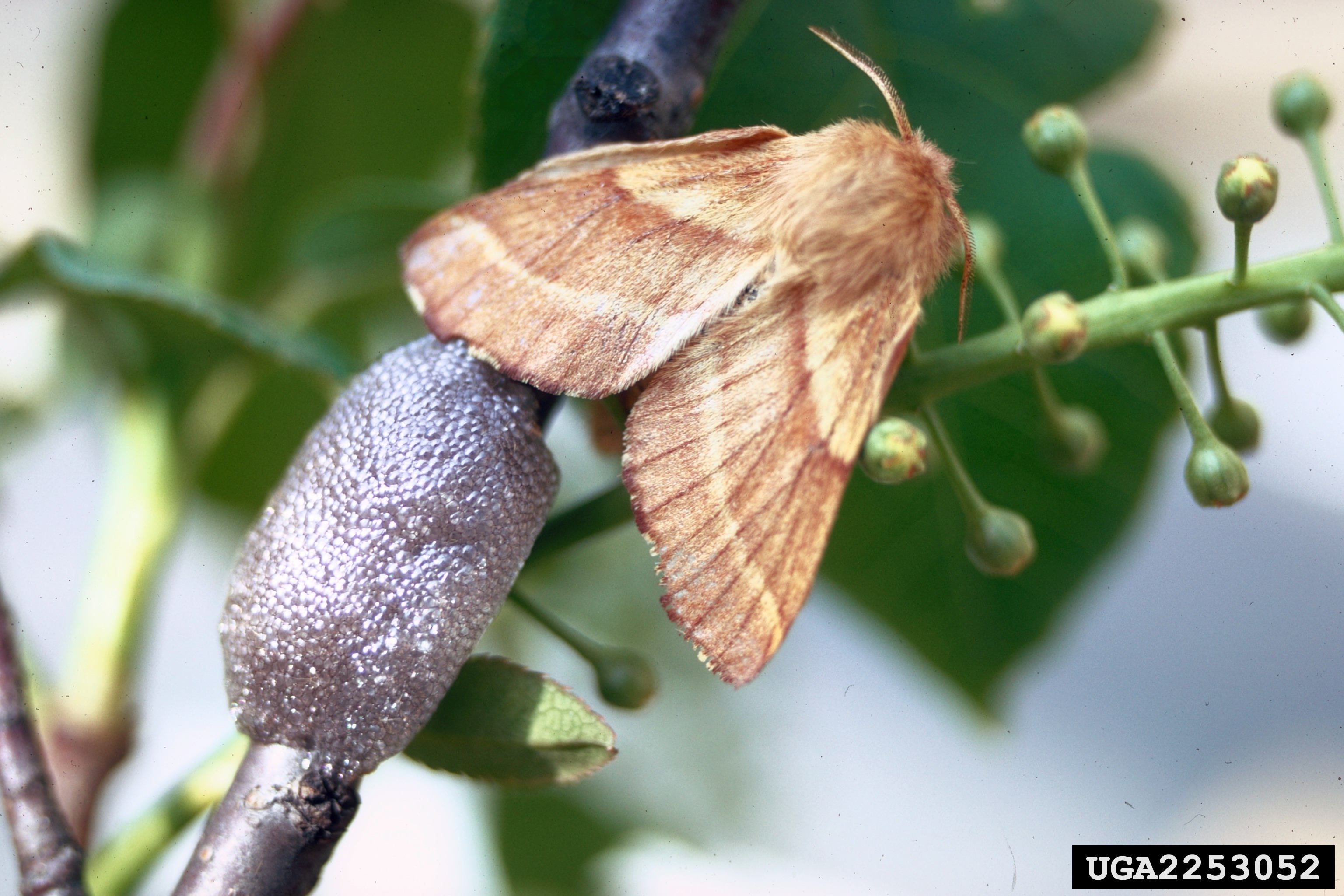
Female M. californicum with egg mass

== Nucleopolyhedrovirus ==
Nuclear polyhedrosis virus (NPV) is a virus that affects insects, mainly butterflies and moths. NPV has shown to decrease fitness and cause death. The body of larvae that die from NPV become thin and liquidy. Increased temperatures has shown to increase the prevalence of this virus. NPV can be transferred from parent to offspring or from individuals that come into physical contact. Additionally, caterpillars can contract NPV by coming in contact with silk strands from other larvae. NPV infections does not always kill the caterpillar and survival is much more likely in late instar caterpillar. NPV infected caterpillars have reduced fecundity.

== Outbreaks ==
Outbreaks are caused when population sizes of larvae reach their highest levels. Population outbreaks of western tent caterpillar occur in cycles every 6–11 years. Severe outbreaks can cause defoliation of host trees however, most trees will grow their leaves back quickly. Outbreaks of western tent caterpillar can cause large scale defoliation of trees. The caterpillars are considered by many to be a problem when they reach outbreak population sizes. However, outbreaks of larvae are considered to be more of a nuisance than a problem and does not negatively affect forest health because trees are able to regrow leaves quickly. Human suppression of western tent caterpillars is most successful when intervening before high population numbers are reached. The exact cause of population outbreaks is not truly understood, but a combination of many factors are believed to play a role in population fluctuations such as weather, predators, and virus. However, NPV is believed to play the largest role in the boom-and-bust of population outbreak cycles. Outbreaks of NPV Epizootic disease play significant roles in controlling population sizes of western tent caterpillars As populations of western tent caterpillar increase the prevalence of the disease increases and causes the subsequent crash of a population.

== Phenology ==
Western tent caterpillars have strong ecological interactions with their host plants. The time of caterpillar egg-hatch is closely timed with host plant bud-burst to ensure that early instar larvae are able to feed on leaves. However, caterpillars can hatch up to two weeks before or after tree's buds have burst. Due to effects of climate change it is predicted that there will be a phenological asynchrony between host tree and the western tent caterpillar, characterized by advancing larval emergence. This does not appear to have significant effects on caterpillar larvae fitness because larvae are resistant to starvation.

== Subspecies ==
- Malacosoma californicum ambisimile (Dyar, 1893)
- Malacosoma californicum californicum
- Malacosoma californicum fragile (Stretch, 1881)
- Malacosoma californicum lutescens (Neumoegen & Dyar, 1893)
- Malacosoma californicum pluvialis (Dyar, 1893)
- Malacosoma californicum recenseo Dyar, 1928
