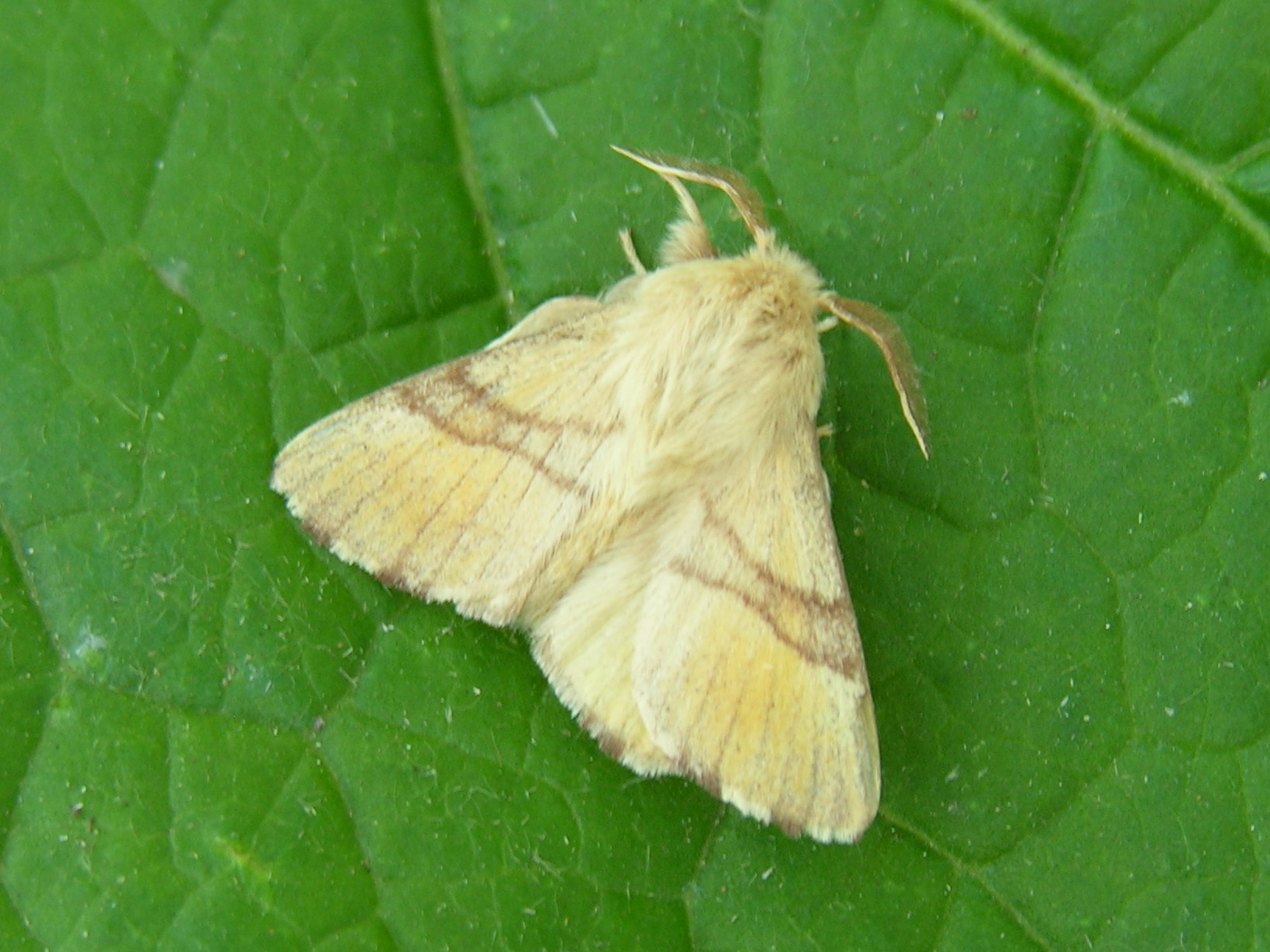
- Adult with light coloration
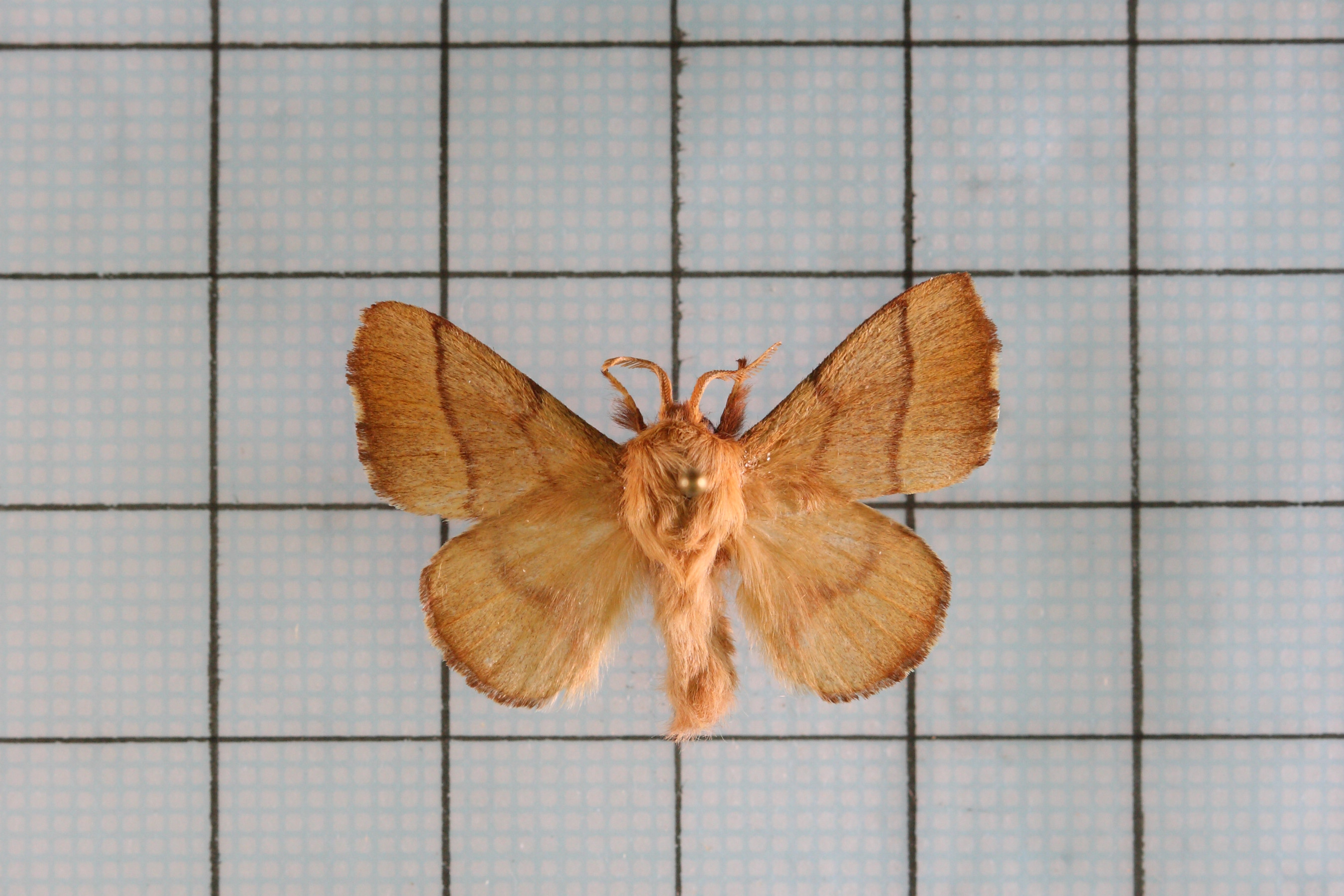
- Malacosoma neustria formosana

Scientific classification
- Kingdom: Animalia
- Phylum: Arthropoda
- Class: Insecta
- Order: Lepidoptera
- Family: Lasiocampidae
- Genus: Malacosoma
- Species: M. neustria

Binomial name
- Malacosoma neustria (Linnaeus, 1758)

Synonyms
- Phalaena neustria Linnaeus, 1758

= Lackey moth =

Lackey

Species of moth

The lackey moth (Malacosoma neustria) is a moth in the family Lasiocampidae. It was first described by Carl Linnaeus in his 1758 10th edition of Systema Naturae. It is common across southern Britain and central Europe. Malacosoma species are notable for their caterpillars which are brightly coloured and form silken tents to regulate their temperature. Malacosoma neustria caterpillars are brown with blue, orange and white stripes. The adults are a fairly uniform brown. The larvae feed mainly on trees and shrubs from within their tents.

== Subspecies ==
- Malacosoma neustria neustria
- Malacosoma neustria flavescens Grünberg, 1912 (Morocco, Algeria)
- Malacosoma neustria formosana Matsumura, 1932 (Taiwan)

== Distribution and habitat ==
The lackey moth is widely distributed across Europe, Asia and North Africa. Its habitat is the edges of woodland, bushy grassland, coppices, hedgerows and road verges. The caterpillar's food plants include apple, pear, plum, willow, hornbeam, lime and oak.

== Life cycle ==
Eggs of the lackey moth are laid in ring-like bands in late summer on twigs of the host trees where they overwinter. On hatching, the larvae are gregarious and weave for themselves a silken canopy of webbing. They eat the young foliage of the tree and moult several times as they grow larger. When ready to pupate they drop to the ground and undergo metamorphosis, each forming a pupa sandwiched between leaves of plants growing beneath the tree. In both Britain and Germany the flight period is from June to August.

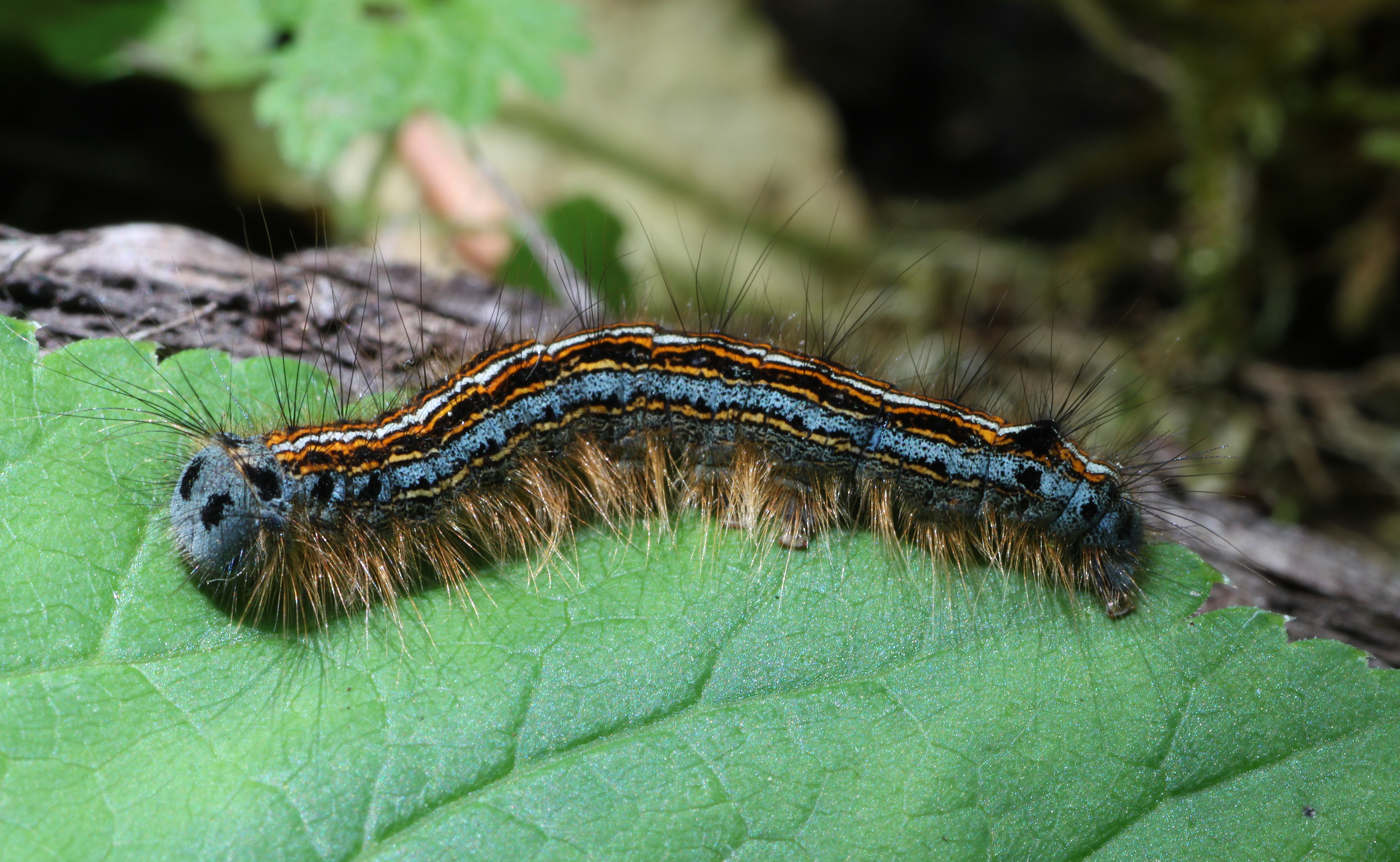
Caterpillar, Ermingen, Ulm, Germany

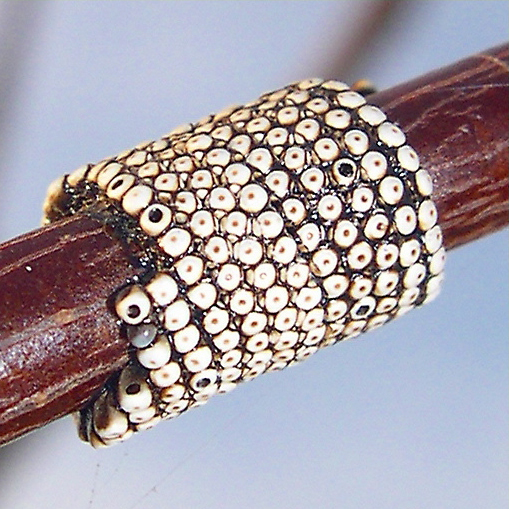
Eggs
