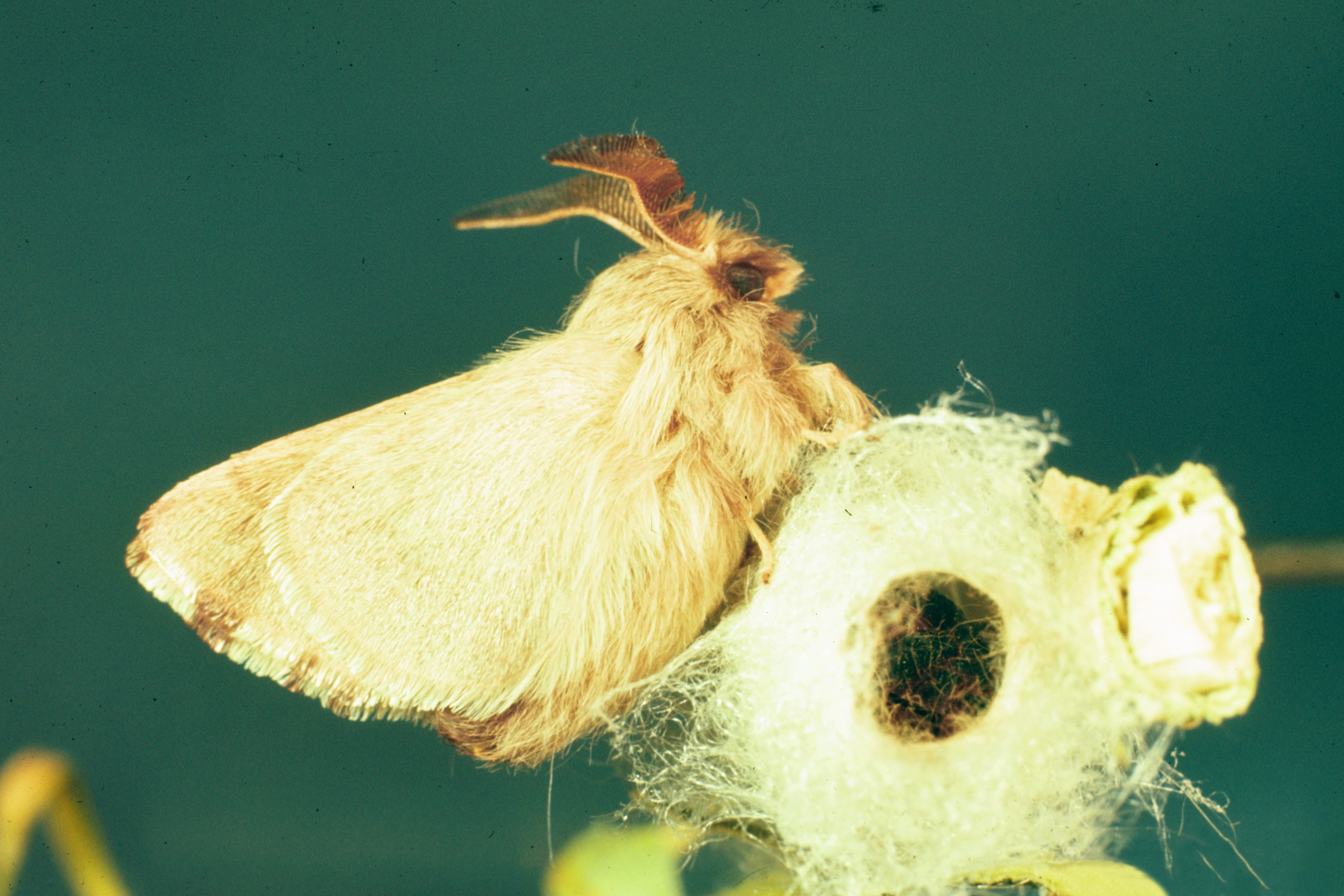

Scientific classification
- Domain: Eukaryota
- Kingdom: Animalia
- Phylum: Arthropoda
- Class: Insecta
- Order: Lepidoptera
- Family: Lasiocampidae
- Genus: Malacosoma
- Species: M. incurva

Binomial name
- Malacosoma incurva (H. Edwards, 1882)

Synonyms
- Clisiocampa incurva H. Edwards, 1882; Malacosoma incurvum; Clisiocampa incurva var. constrictina Neumoegen & Dyar, 1893; Clisiocampa azteca Neumoegen, 1893; Clisiocampa luteomargo Dyar, 1907; Clisiocampa mus var. discolorata Neumoegen, 1893

= Malacosoma incurva =

Southwestern tent caterpillar moth

Species of moth

Malacosoma incurva, the southwestern tent caterpillar moth, is a species of moth of the family Lasiocampidae. It was first described by Henry Edwards in 1882. It is found in south-western North America, including Arizona, New Mexico, Nevada and Utah.

The wingspan is about 27 mm.

The larvae feed on Populus fremontii, Salix and Prunus species.

== Subspecies ==
- Malacosoma incurva incurva
- Malacosoma incurva discoloratum (Neumoegen, 1893)

== Gallery ==
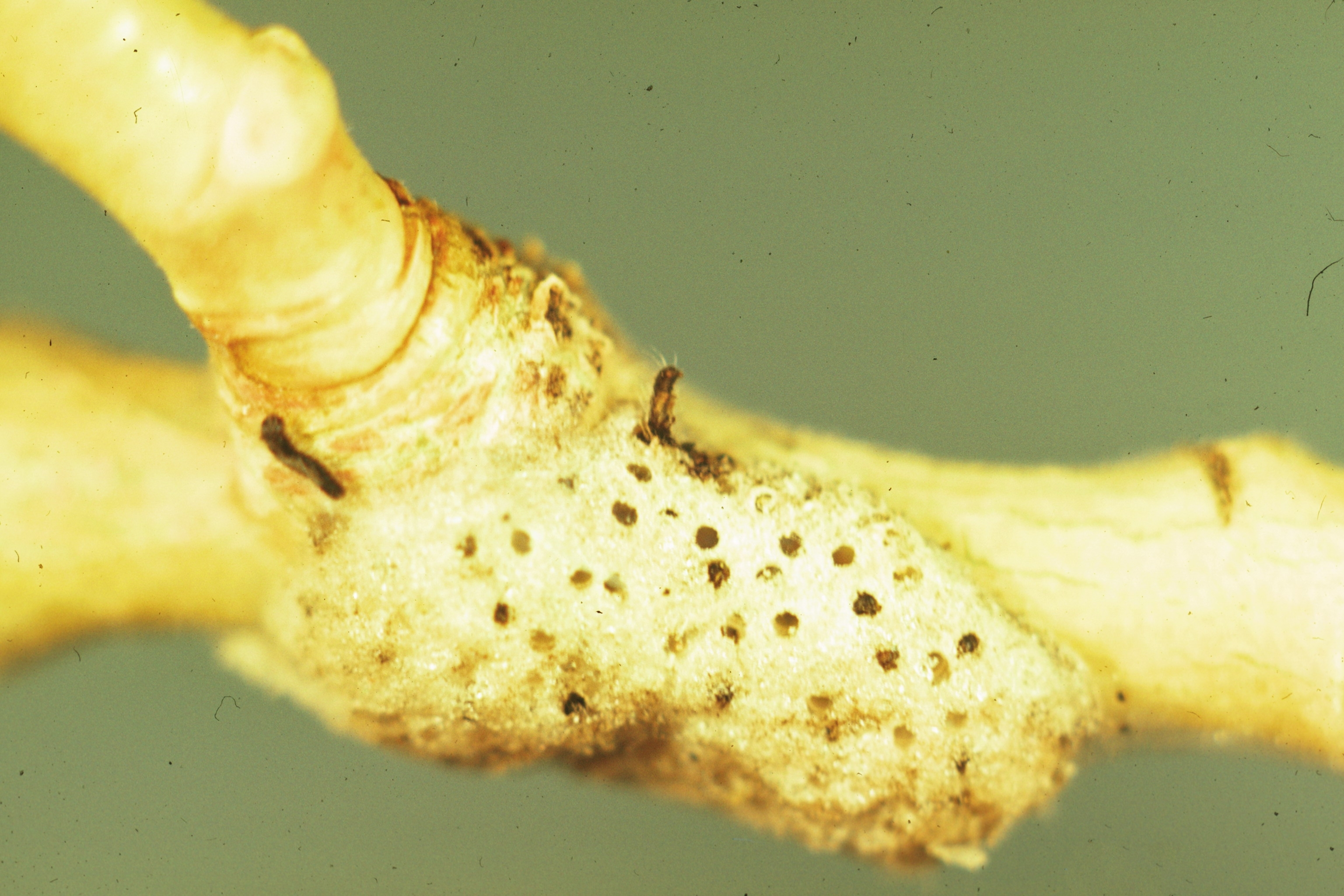
Egg

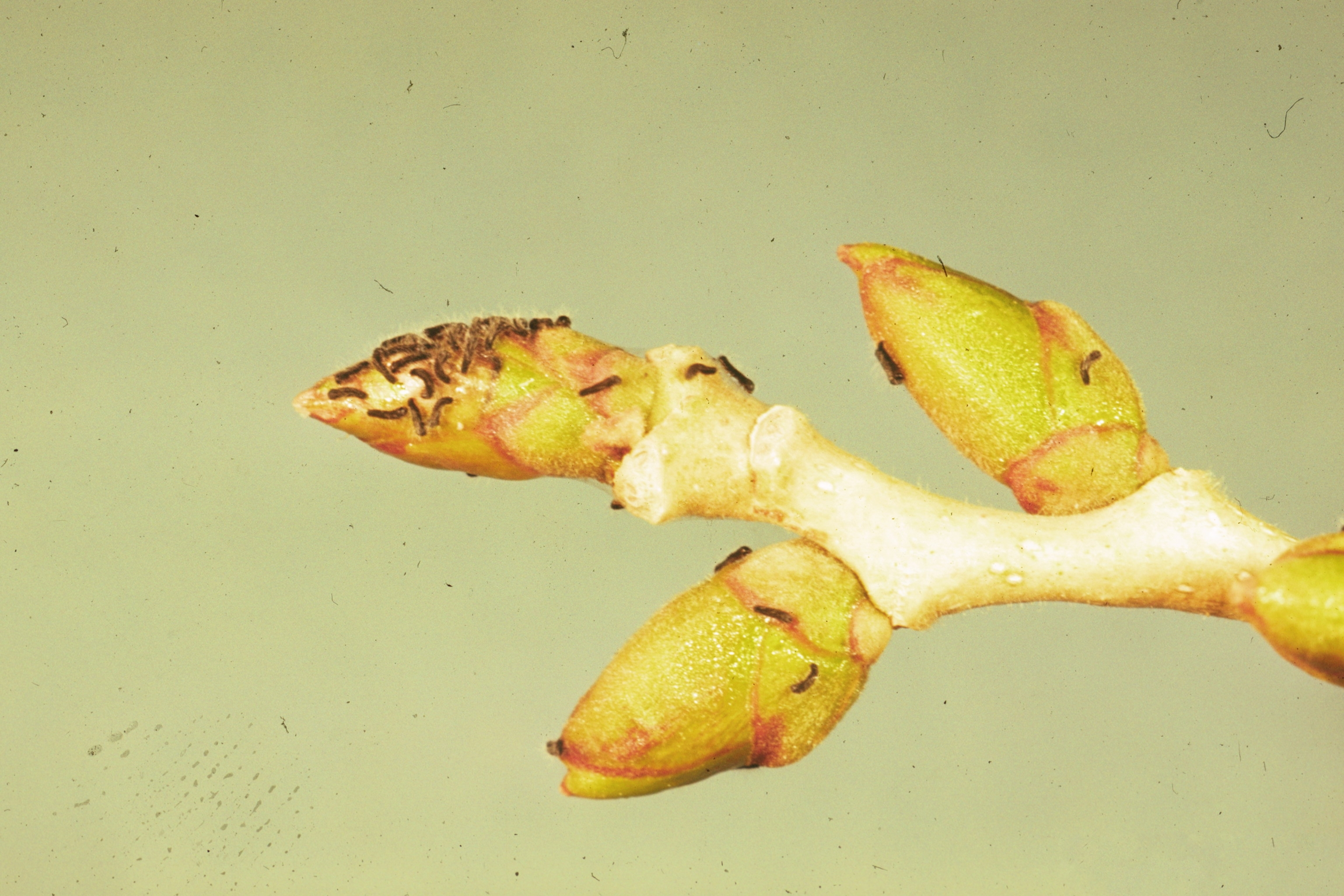
First-instar larva

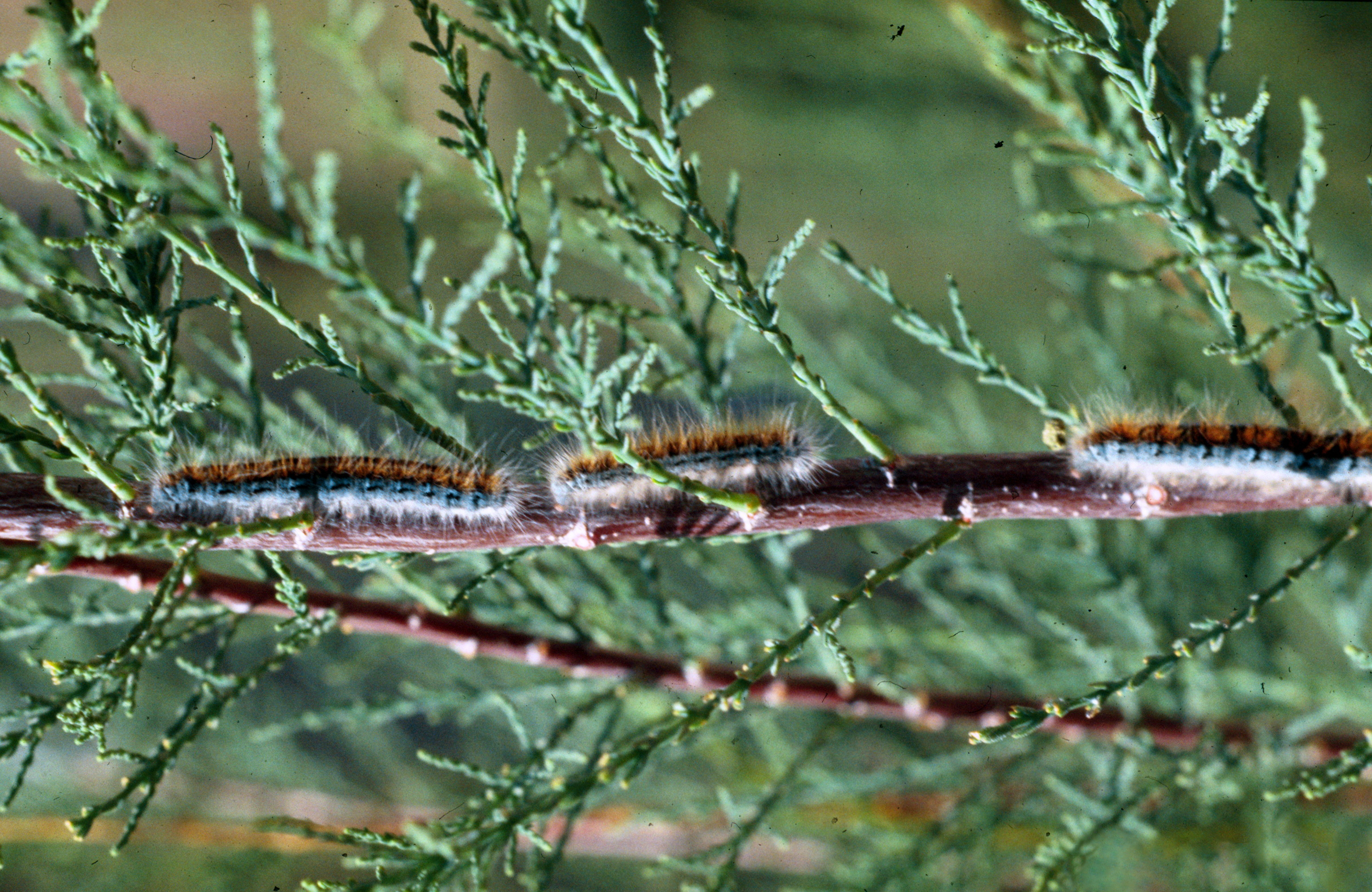
Larva

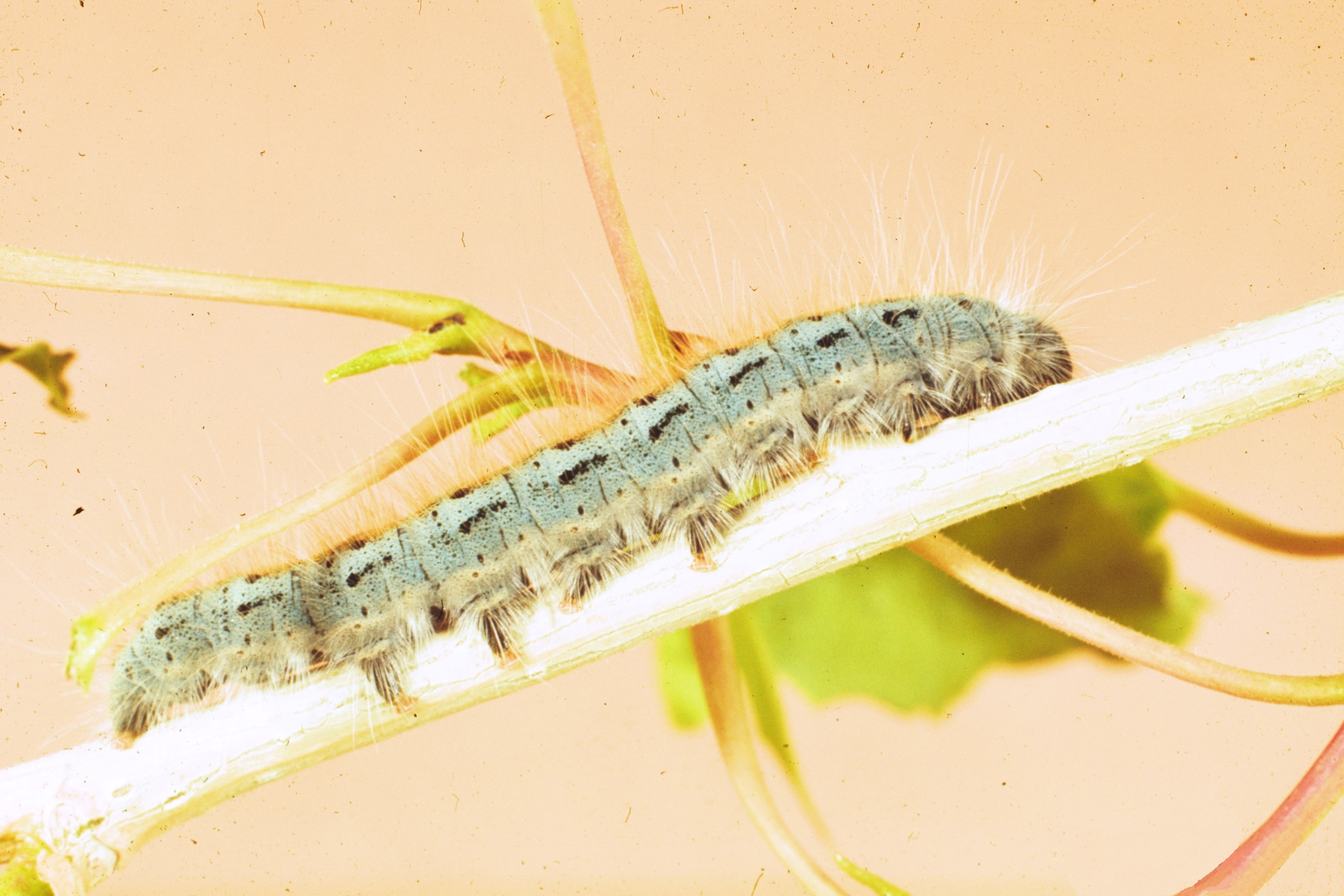
Larva

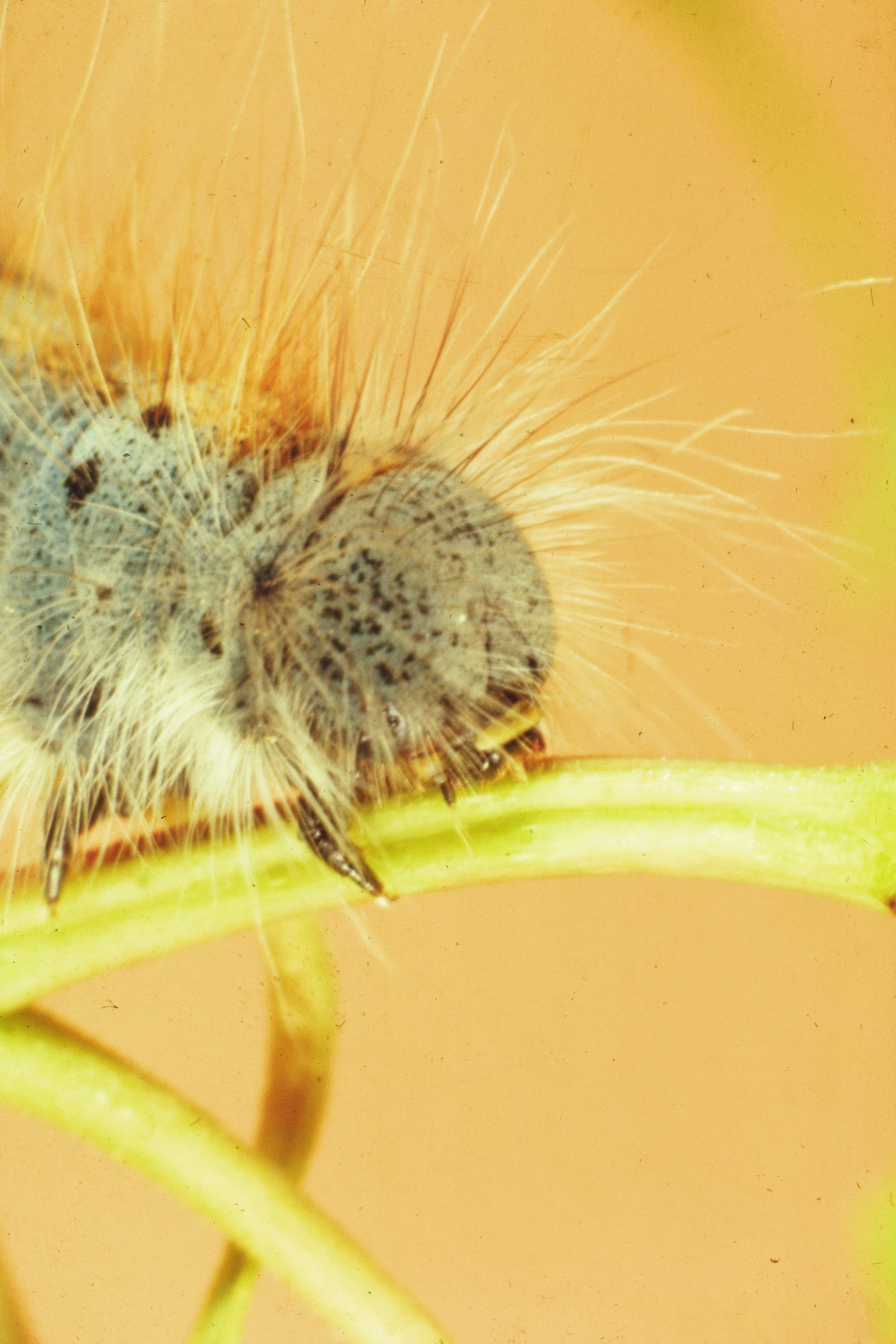
Larva, close up

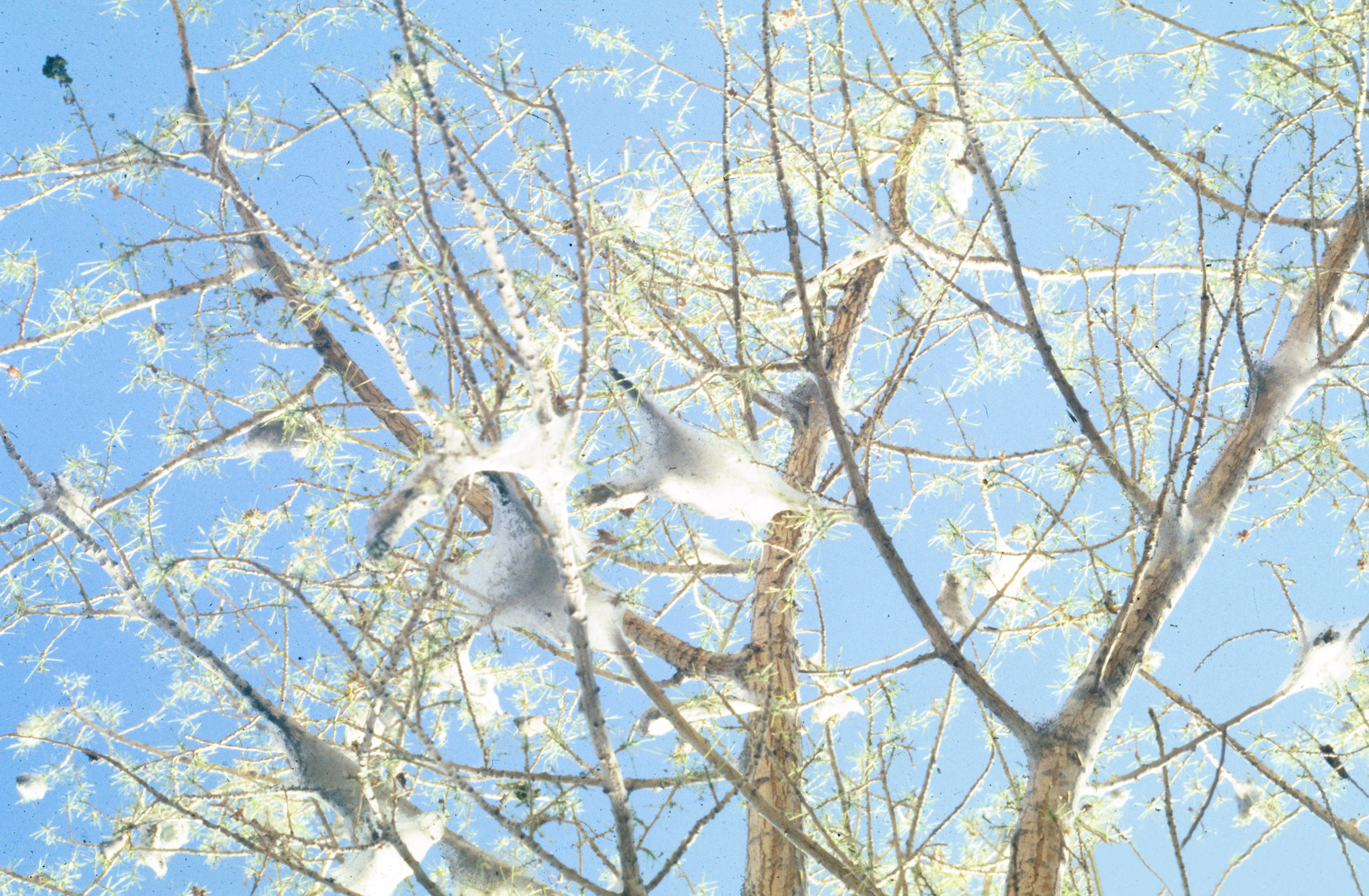
Damage

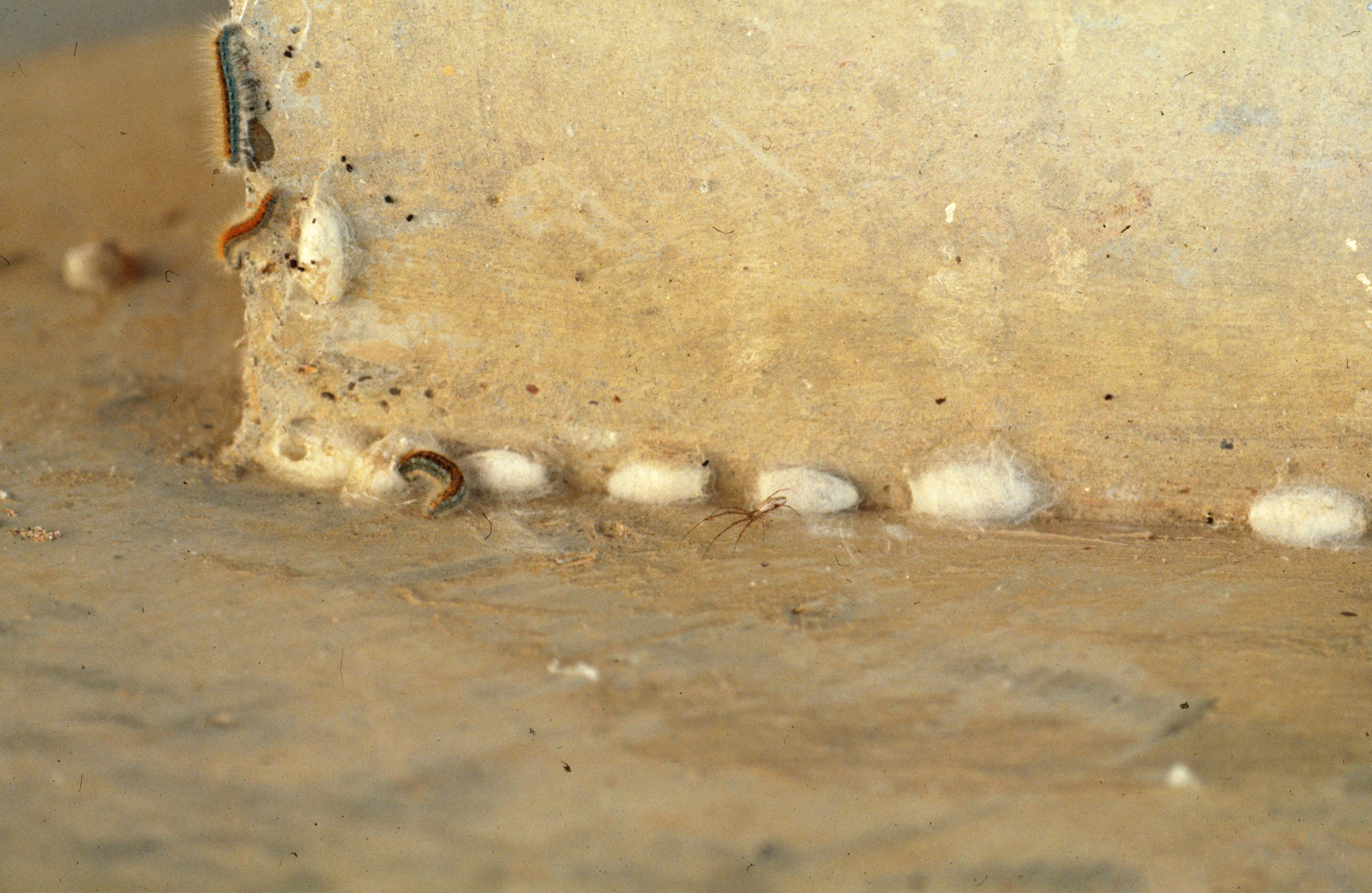
Pupa

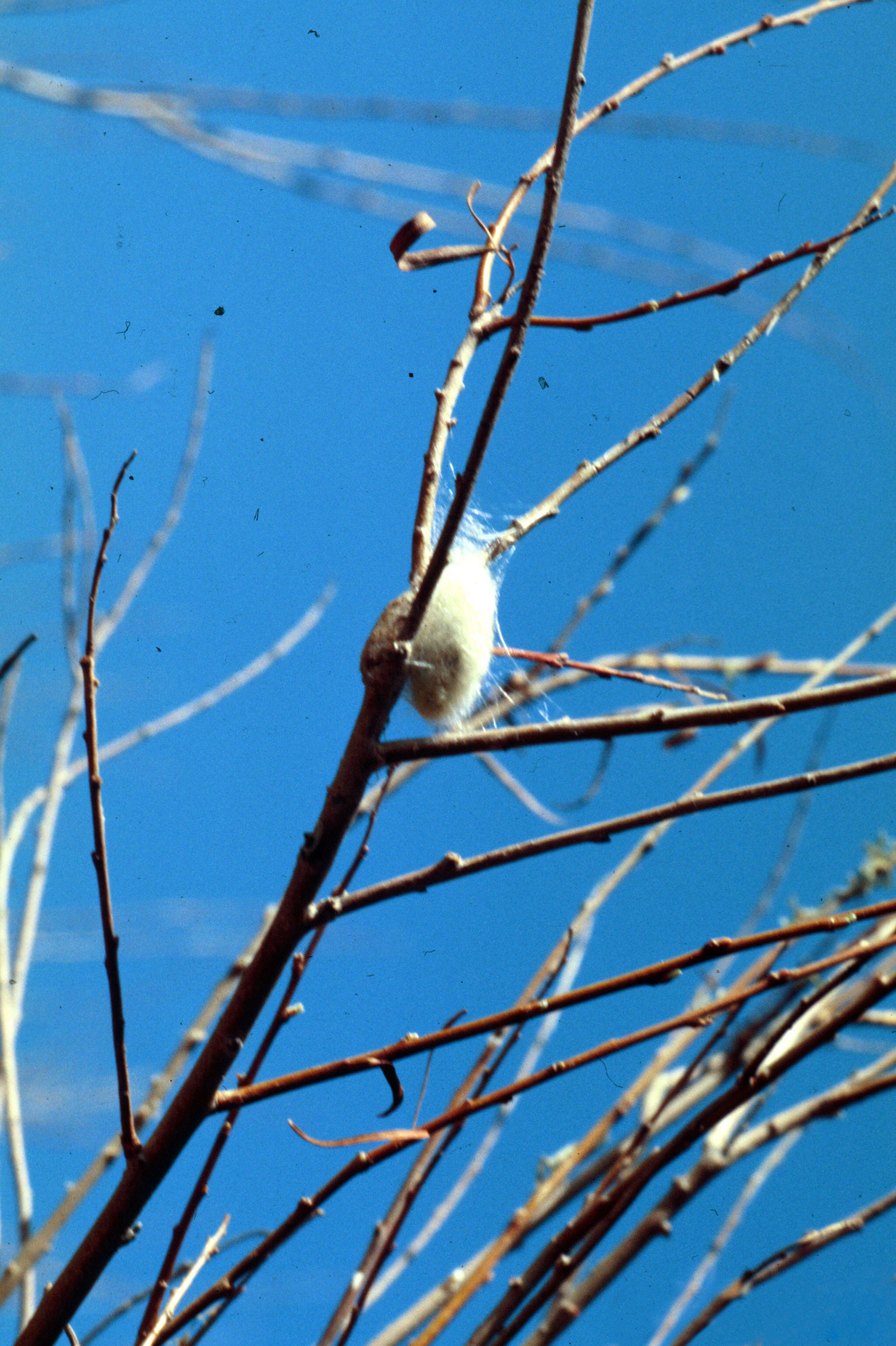
Pupa

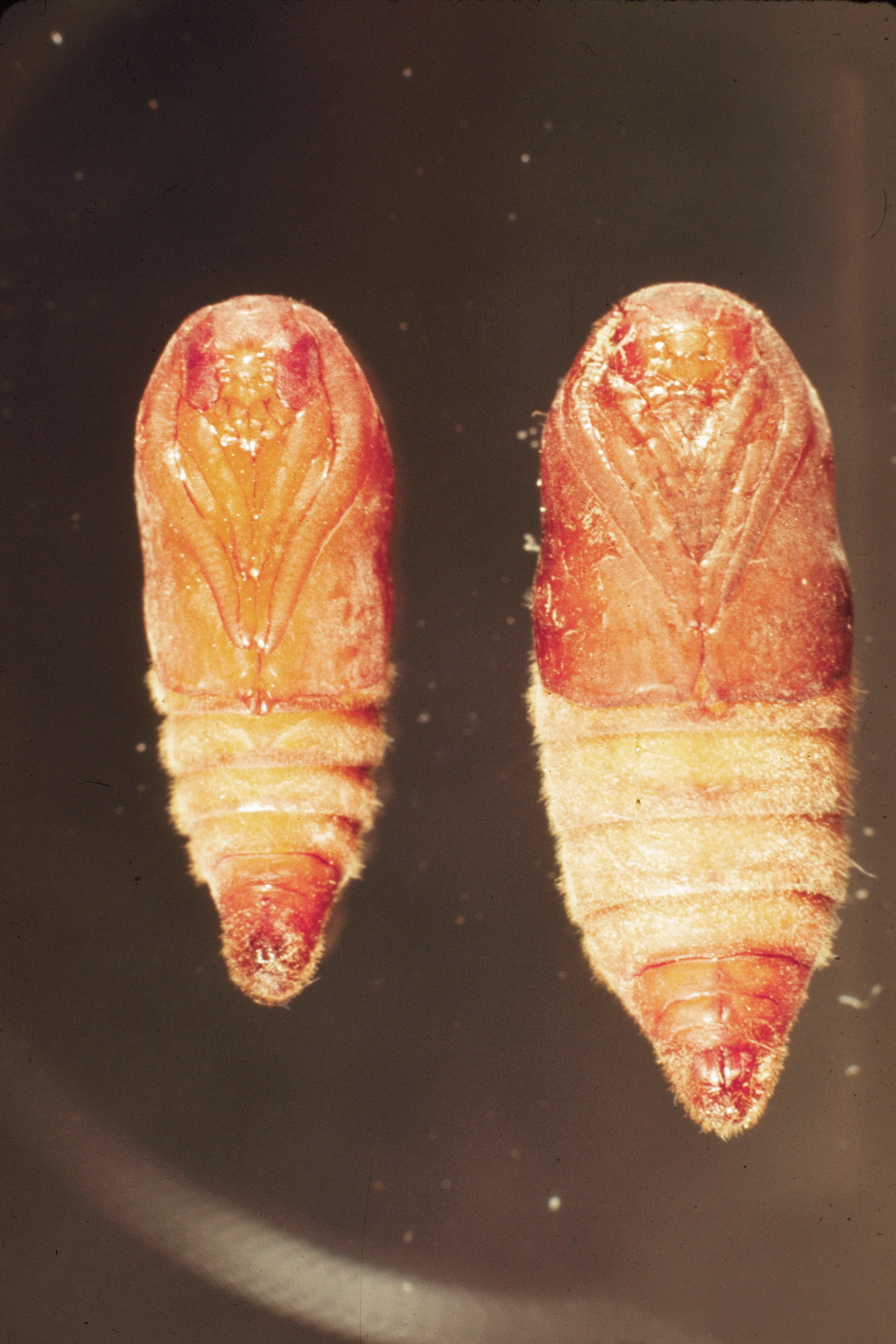
Pupa
