= Cirphis (moth) =

Scientific classification
- Kingdom: Animalia
- Phylum: Arthropoda
- Class: Insecta
- Order: Lepidoptera
- Superfamily: Noctuoidea
- Family: Noctuidae
- Subfamily: Noctuinae
- Tribe: Hadenini
- Genus: Cirphis; Walker, 1865
- Species: C. ebriosa

Binomial name
- Cirphis ebriosa Guenée, 1852

Synonyms
- Leucania ebriosa Guenée, 1852

Genus of moths

Cirphis is a genus of owlet moths in the family Noctuidae. This genus has a single species, Cirphis ebriosa, found in Australia.

Cirphis ebriosa is sometimes classified as a member of the genus Leucania.
