= Calosoma janssensi =

Scientific classification
- Domain: Eukaryota
- Kingdom: Animalia
- Phylum: Arthropoda
- Class: Insecta
- Order: Coleoptera
- Suborder: Adephaga
- Family: Carabidae
- Genus: Calosoma
- Species: C. janssensi

Binomial name
- Calosoma janssensi Basilewsky, 1953

Species of beetle

Calosoma janssensi is a species of ground beetle in the subfamily of Carabinae. It was described by Pierre Basilewsky in 1953. This species is found in the Democratic Republic of Congo.

Adults reach a length of 26-30 mm and are brachypterous.

== Taxonomy ==
This species is treated as a subspecies of Calosoma oberthueri by some authors.

== Etymology ==
The species is named for Belgian entomologist André Janssens.
