= Calosoma flohri =

Scientific classification
- Kingdom: Animalia
- Phylum: Arthropoda
- Class: Insecta
- Order: Coleoptera
- Suborder: Adephaga
- Family: Carabidae
- Subfamily: Carabinae
- Tribe: Carabini
- Genus: Calosoma
- Species: C. flohri

Binomial name
- Calosoma flohri Bates, 1884

Synonyms
- Calosoma gebieni Breuning, 1928; Carabomimus flohri; Calosoma ortrudae Häckel & Heinz, 2011; Calosoma (Carabomimus) zirostense Häckel, Heinz & Sehnal, 2011; Calosoma (Carabomimus) lesnei Breuning, 1931

Species of beetle

Calosoma flohri, Flohr's caterpillar hunter, is a species of ground beetle in the family Carabidae. It is found in Mexico, where it inhabits wet pine/oak forests, pastures and grasslands, as well as cornfields.

Adults are brachypterous and nocturnal.
