= Calosoma relictum =

Scientific classification
- Domain: Eukaryota
- Kingdom: Animalia
- Phylum: Arthropoda
- Class: Insecta
- Order: Coleoptera
- Suborder: Adephaga
- Family: Carabidae
- Genus: Calosoma
- Species: C. relictum

Binomial name
- Calosoma relictum Apfelbeck, 1918

Synonyms
- Calosoma pentheroides Roubal, 1932; Calosoma schurmanni Breuning, 1977

Species of beetle

Calosoma relictum is a species of ground beetle in the subfamily of Carabinae. It was described by Apfelbeck in 1918. This species is found in northern Macedonia and neighboring areas of Albania.

Adults reach a length of 13-20 mm, are brachypterous and have a green colour.

== Taxonomy ==
This species is treated as a subspecies of Calosoma pentheri by some authors.
