= Calosoma subasperatum =

Scientific classification
- Domain: Eukaryota
- Kingdom: Animalia
- Phylum: Arthropoda
- Class: Insecta
- Order: Coleoptera
- Suborder: Adephaga
- Family: Carabidae
- Subfamily: Carabinae
- Tribe: Carabini
- Genus: Calosoma
- Species: C. subasperatum

Binomial name
- Calosoma subasperatum Schaeffer, 1915

Synonyms
- Calosoma subasperatus; Callisthenes klamathensis Casey, 1920

Species of beetle

Calosoma subasperatum, the rough beautiful black searcher, is a species in the beetle family Carabidae. It is found in the United States (California, Nevada, Oregon), where it has been recorded from midland areas.

Adults are brachypterous.
