= Calosoma latipenne =

Scientific classification
- Domain: Eukaryota
- Kingdom: Animalia
- Phylum: Arthropoda
- Class: Insecta
- Order: Coleoptera
- Suborder: Adephaga
- Family: Carabidae
- Subfamily: Carabinae
- Tribe: Carabini
- Genus: Calosoma
- Species: C. latipenne

Binomial name
- Calosoma latipenne G.Horn, 1870

Synonyms
- Callisthenes latipennis; Calosoma arcuatum Casey, 1897; Callisthenes opimus Casey, 1913; Callisthenes tularensis Casey, 1913

Species of beetle

Calosoma latipenne, the broad beautiful black searcher, is a species in the beetle family Carabidae. It is found in the United States (California, Nevada), where it inhabits sandy soils with desert scrub in lowlands and sandy soils and rocky terrain in Juniper-Pinyon pine open forests on the foothills.

Adults are brachypterous and are known to prey on grasshopper species.
