= Calosoma marginatum =

Scientific classification
- Domain: Eukaryota
- Kingdom: Animalia
- Phylum: Arthropoda
- Class: Insecta
- Order: Coleoptera
- Suborder: Adephaga
- Family: Carabidae
- Subfamily: Carabinae
- Tribe: Carabini
- Genus: Calosoma
- Species: C. marginatum

Binomial name
- Calosoma marginatum Gebler, 1830

Synonyms
- Calosoma marginatus

Species of beetle

Calosoma marginatum is a species of ground beetle in the family Carabidae. It is found in Kazakhstan and China.

== Subspecies ==
These two subspecies belong to the species Calosoma marginatum:

- Calosoma marginatum marginatum Gebler, 1830 (Kazakhstan)
- Calosoma marginatum pseudocarabus Semenov & Redikorzev, 1928 (China and Kazakhstan)
