= Calosoma anthrax =

Scientific classification
- Domain: Eukaryota
- Kingdom: Animalia
- Phylum: Arthropoda
- Class: Insecta
- Order: Coleoptera
- Suborder: Adephaga
- Family: Carabidae
- Subfamily: Carabinae
- Tribe: Carabini
- Genus: Calosoma
- Species: C. anthrax

Binomial name
- Calosoma anthrax Semenov, 1900

Synonyms
- Calosoma grumi Semenov, 1900

Species of beetle

Calosoma anthrax is a species of ground beetle in the family Carabidae. It is found in China and Mongolia.

Adults reach a length of 21.5-25.5 mm, they are brachypterous and have a very dark colour with weak bronzed reflexes.

== Subspecies ==
These two subspecies belong to the species Calosoma anthrax:

- Calosoma anthrax anthrax Semenov, 1900 (China and Mongolia)
- Calosoma anthrax grumi Semenov, 1900 (China: Qinghai)
