= Calosoma ewersmanni =

Scientific classification
- Kingdom: Animalia
- Phylum: Arthropoda
- Class: Insecta
- Order: Coleoptera
- Suborder: Adephaga
- Family: Carabidae
- Subfamily: Carabinae
- Tribe: Carabini
- Genus: Calosoma
- Species: C. ewersmanni

Binomial name
- Calosoma ewersmanni (Chaudoir, 1850)

Synonyms
- Calosoma eversmanni; Callisthenes ewersmanni Chaudoir, 1850; Callisthenes adehinotus Lassalle, 1992; Callisthenes persicus Géhin, 1885; Callisthenes eversmanni Gemminger & Harold, 1868; Calosoma pesarinii Heinz & Pavesi, 1994

Species of beetle

Calosoma ewersmanni is a species of ground beetle in the family Carabidae. It is found in central northern Turkey.

Adults reach a length of 19-27 mm and are brachypterous.

== Etymology ==
The species is named for German naturalist Alexander Eduard Friedrich Ewersmann.

== Subspecies ==
These two subspecies belong to the species Calosoma ewersmanni:

- Calosoma ewersmanni ewersmanni (Chaudoir, 1850)
- Calosoma ewersmanni peksi Heinz & Pavesi, 1994
