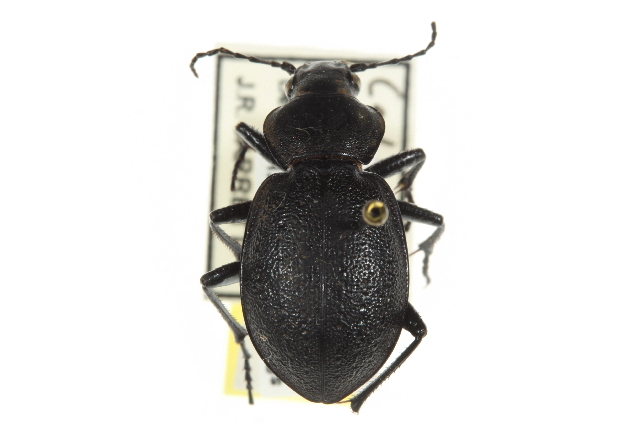

Scientific classification
- Domain: Eukaryota
- Kingdom: Animalia
- Phylum: Arthropoda
- Class: Insecta
- Order: Coleoptera
- Suborder: Adephaga
- Family: Carabidae
- Subfamily: Carabinae
- Tribe: Carabini
- Genus: Calosoma
- Species: C. wilkesii

Binomial name
- Calosoma wilkesii (LeConte, 1852)

Synonyms
- Calosoma wilkesi

= Calosoma wilkesii =

Species of beetle

Calosoma wilkesii, Wilkes's beautiful black searcher, is a species in the beetle family Carabidae. It is found in the United States and Canada (British Columbia, California, Idaho, Oregon, Washington), where it inhabits fields and meadows.

Adults are brachypterous and nocturnal.
