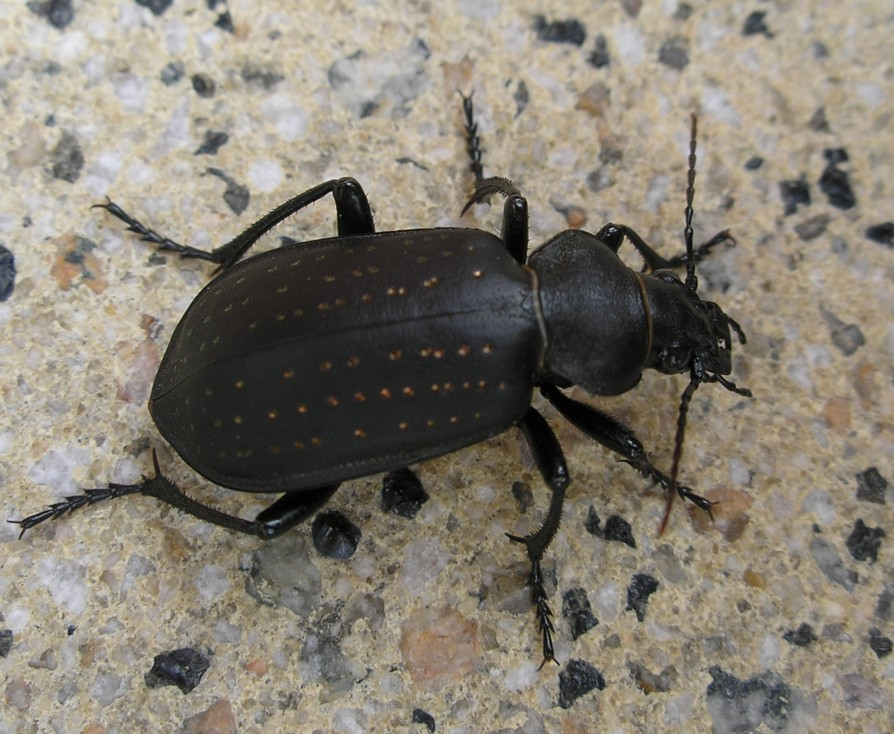

Scientific classification
- Kingdom: Animalia
- Phylum: Arthropoda
- Class: Insecta
- Order: Coleoptera
- Suborder: Adephaga
- Family: Carabidae
- Subfamily: Carabinae
- Tribe: Carabini
- Genus: Calosoma
- Species: C. auropunctatum

Binomial name
- Calosoma auropunctatum (Herbst, 1784)

Synonyms
- Calosoma iranicum Mandl, 1953; Carabus auropunctatus Herbst, 1784; Calosoma aureomarginatum Letzner, 1850; Campalita duftschmidi Géhin, 1885; Carabus herbsti Gmelin, 1790; Campalita nicolasi Schuler, 1965; Calosoma parvepunctatum Della Beffa, 1983; Calosoma nitens Letzner, 1850; Calosoma obscurum Letzner, 1850; Carabus sericeus Fabricius, 1792; Campalita syra Lapouge, 1930; Calosoma afganum Lapouge, 1930; Calosoma funestum Géhin, 1885; Callisoma tauricum Motschulsky, 1850; Calosoma (Campalita) tectum Motschulsky, 1844; Campalita alaiensis Lapouge, 1930; Calosoma laeviusculum Motschulsky, 1844; Campalita montandoni Lapouge, 1930; Calosoma tauricum Motschulsky, 1850; Calosoma parallelum Motschulsky, 1844; Campalita serica Lapouge, 1930; Calosoma turcomannicum Motschulsky, 1844

= Calosoma auropunctatum =

Species of beetle

Calosoma auropunctatum, is a species of ground beetle. This species was previously classified as Calosome maderae ssp. auropunctatum. This species is found from Europe (except in western and southwestern parts) eastward to Anatolia, Central Asia and western China and Mongolia.

== Subspecies ==
- Calosoma auropunctatum auropunctatum (Denmark, Norway, Sweden, France, Belgium, Netherlands, Germany, Switzerland, Austria, Czechia, Slovakia, Hungary, Poland, Estonia, Latvia, Lithuania, Ukraine, Italy, Slovenia, Croatia, Bosnia-Herzegovina, former Yugoslavia, Greece, Bulgaria, Romania, Moldova, Syria, Turkey, Russia)
- Calosoma auropunctatum dsungaricum Gebler, 1833 (Ukraine, Greece, Bulgaria, Romania, Syria, Turkey, Cyprus, Iraq, Arab Emirates, Iran, Georgia, Armenia, Azerbaijan, Kazakhstan, Uzbekistan, Turkmenistan, Kyrgyzstan, Tadzhikistan, Afghanistan, China, Pakistan, Russia, Mongolia)
