= Calosoma politum =

Scientific classification
- Domain: Eukaryota
- Kingdom: Animalia
- Phylum: Arthropoda
- Class: Insecta
- Order: Coleoptera
- Suborder: Adephaga
- Family: Carabidae
- Subfamily: Carabinae
- Tribe: Carabini
- Genus: Calosoma
- Species: C. politum

Binomial name
- Calosoma politum Chaudoir, 1869

Synonyms
- Calosoma diminutum Bates, 1891; Callisthenes laevissimus Casey, 1920; Carabomimus nitidus Géhin, 1885

Species of beetle

Calosoma politum, the furbished caterpillar hunter, is a species of ground beetle in the family Carabidae. It is found in Mexico (Puebla, México, Tlaxcala, Veracruz), where it is found in pine/fir forests, sloping pastures, meadows and pine/alder/manzanita forest edges.

Adults are brachypterous.
