= Calosoma catenatum =

Scientific classification
- Domain: Eukaryota
- Kingdom: Animalia
- Phylum: Arthropoda
- Class: Insecta
- Order: Coleoptera
- Suborder: Adephaga
- Family: Carabidae
- Subfamily: Carabinae
- Tribe: Carabini
- Genus: Calosoma
- Species: C. catenatum

Binomial name
- Calosoma catenatum (Roeschke, 1899)

Synonyms
- \: Calosoma catenatus; Carabomorphus catenatus Roeschke, 1899; Carabomorphus bastinelleri Roeschke, 1899; Carabomorphus jabbalae Basilewsky, 1967; Carabomorphus kolbi Roeschke, 1899; Carabomorphus kenyicola Jeannel, 1940; Carabomorphus meruensis Jeannel, 1940

Species of beetle

Calosoma catenatum is a species of ground beetle in the family Carabidae. It is found in Kenya.

== Subspecies ==
These two subspecies belong to the species Calosoma catenatum:

- Calosoma catenatum catenatum (Roeschke, 1899)
- Calosoma catenatum kenyicola (Jeannel, 1940)
