= Calosoma depressicolle =

Scientific classification
- Kingdom: Animalia
- Phylum: Arthropoda
- Class: Insecta
- Order: Coleoptera
- Suborder: Adephaga
- Family: Carabidae
- Subfamily: Carabinae
- Tribe: Carabini
- Genus: Calosoma
- Species: C. depressicolle

Binomial name
- Calosoma depressicolle Chaudoir, 1869

Synonyms
- Carabomimus altipeta Jeannel, 1940; Carabomimus asper Jeannel, 1940; Carabomimus sylvestris Lassalle, 2009

Species of beetle

Calosoma depressicolle, the flat-necked caterpillar hunter, is a species of ground beetle in the family Carabidae. It is found in Mexico (Jalisco, Michoacan, México), where it inhabits pine/juniper, pine/oak, pine/fir and oak/pine/madrone forests, as well as pastures.

Adults are brachypterous and nocturnal.
