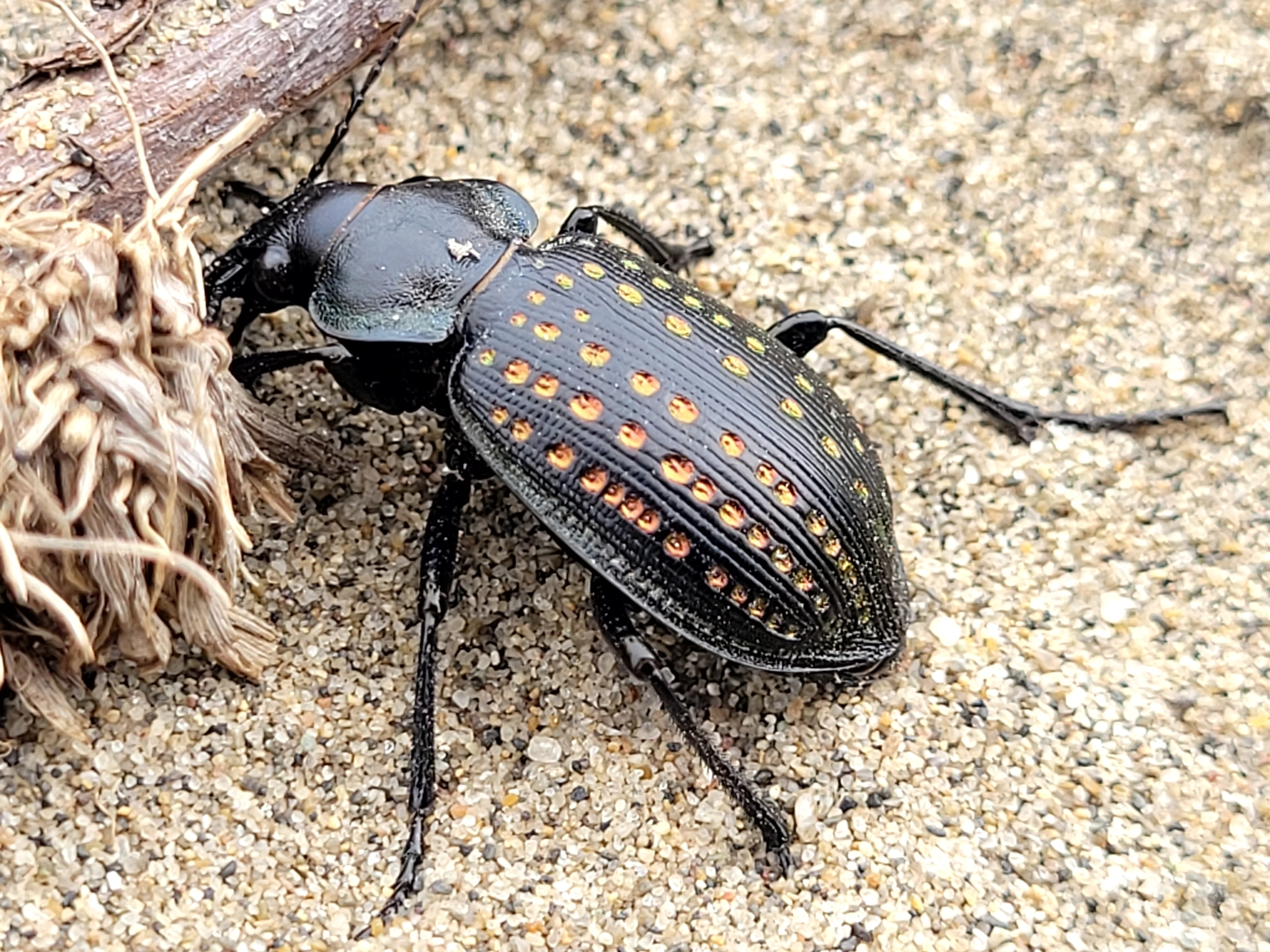
- Calosoma calidum, Canada

Scientific classification
- Domain: Eukaryota
- Kingdom: Animalia
- Phylum: Arthropoda
- Class: Insecta
- Order: Coleoptera
- Suborder: Adephaga
- Family: Carabidae
- Subfamily: Carabinae
- Tribe: Carabini
- Genus: Calosoma
- Species: C. calidum

Binomial name
- Calosoma calidum (Fabricius, 1775)

Synonyms
- Calosoma concreta Casey, 1920; Callisthenes calidus; Carabus calidus Fabricius, 1775; Calosoma comes Casey, 1920; Calosoma concretum Casey, 1920; Calosoma expansum Casey, 1897; Calosoma laticolle Casey, 1897; Chrysostigma ocellatum Lapouge, 1931; Calosoma stellatum Casey, 1897

= Calosoma calidum =

Species of beetle

Calosoma calidum, the fiery hunter, is a species of ground beetle in the subfamily of Carabinae. It was described by Johan Christian Fabricius in 1775. It occurs throughout Canada and the northern and eastern parts of the United States. About 19mm to 27mm long, this beetle is black with rows of red or gold spots or pits on its elytra. It can be found in fields and disturbed habitats. Larvae and adults prey upon moth caterpillars.
