= Calosoma digueti =

Scientific classification
- Domain: Eukaryota
- Kingdom: Animalia
- Phylum: Arthropoda
- Class: Insecta
- Order: Coleoptera
- Suborder: Adephaga
- Family: Carabidae
- Subfamily: Carabinae
- Tribe: Carabini
- Genus: Calosoma
- Species: C. digueti

Binomial name
- Calosoma digueti (Lapouge, 1924)

Synonyms
- Eutelodontus digueti Lapouge, 1924; Carabomimus colimaensis Lassalle, 2009; Carabomimus mascotaensis Lassalle & Berghe, 2011

Species of beetle

Calosoma digueti, Diguet's caterpillar hunter, is a species of ground beetle in the subfamily Carabinae, found in Mexico. The habitat consists of oak/pine and scrub forests.

Adults are brachypterous.

== Subspecies ==
These three subspecies belong to the species Calosoma digueti:

- Calosoma digueti digueti
- Calosoma digueti colimaense (Lassalle, 2009)
- Calosoma digueti hoegei Breuning, 1928
