= Calosoma mirificum =

Scientific classification
- Domain: Eukaryota
- Kingdom: Animalia
- Phylum: Arthropoda
- Class: Insecta
- Order: Coleoptera
- Suborder: Adephaga
- Family: Carabidae
- Subfamily: Carabinae
- Tribe: Carabini
- Genus: Calosoma
- Species: C. mirificum

Binomial name
- Calosoma mirificum (Casale, 1979)

Synonyms
- Callisthenes (Callisthenes) mirificus Casale, 1979; Calosoma mirificus

Species of beetle

Calosoma mirificum is a species in the beetle family Carabidae. It is found in Afghanistan.

Adults reach a length of 33-35 mm and are brachypterous.
