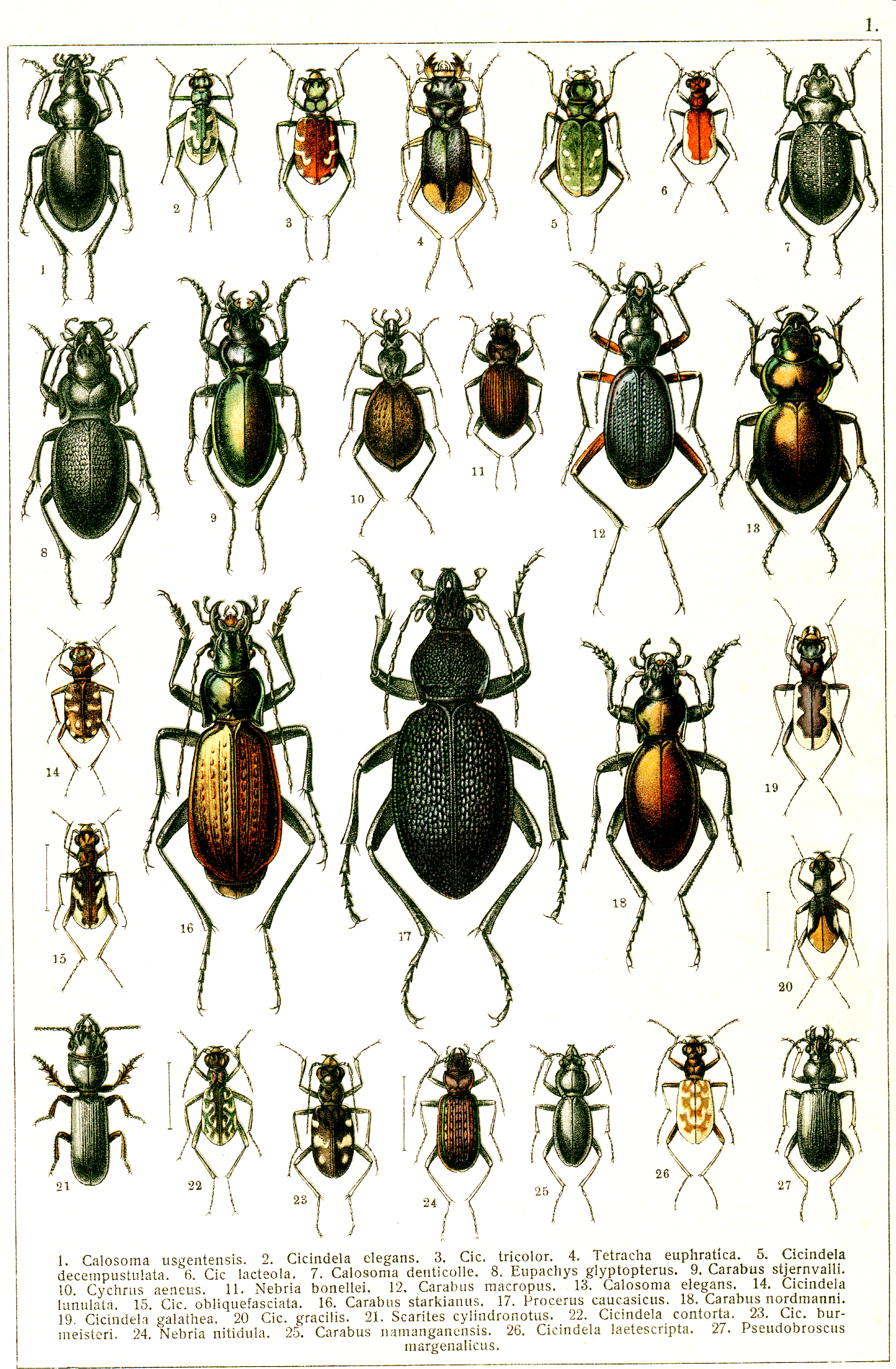
- Illustration of monographs Georgiy Jacobson "Beetles Russia and Western Europe. Calosoma elegans is number 13

Scientific classification
- Domain: Eukaryota
- Kingdom: Animalia
- Phylum: Arthropoda
- Class: Insecta
- Order: Coleoptera
- Suborder: Adephaga
- Family: Carabidae
- Subfamily: Carabinae
- Tribe: Carabini
- Genus: Calosoma
- Species: C. elegans

Binomial name
- Calosoma elegans (Kirsch, 1859)

Synonyms
- Calosoma subtilestriatus; Callisthenes elegans Kirsch, 1859; Callisthenes (Callisthenes) elegans Kirsch 1859; Callisthenes elegans saryarkensis Kabak 1992; Callisthenes (Callisthenes) semenovii Motschulsky, 1860; Callisthenes (Callisthenes) elegans species group; Callisthenes (Callisthenes) elegans valentinae Obydov 1997; Callisthenes purpureus Obydov, 2002; Callisthenes kolshengelicus Obydov, 1997; Callisthenes valentinae Obydov, 1997; Callisthenes declivis C.A.Dohrn, 1884; Callisthenes (Callisthenes) karagaicus Lapouge, 1924; Callisthenes (Callisthenes) manderstjernae Ballion, 1871; Callisthenes keminensis Obydov, 2002; Callisthenes danilevskii Obydov, 1997; Callisthenes vernojensis Lapouge, 1924; Calosoma amethystinum Semenov & Redikorzev, 1928; Callisthenes ballioni Solsky, 1874; Callisthenes ssevertzowi Ballion, 1871

= Calosoma elegans =

Species of beetle

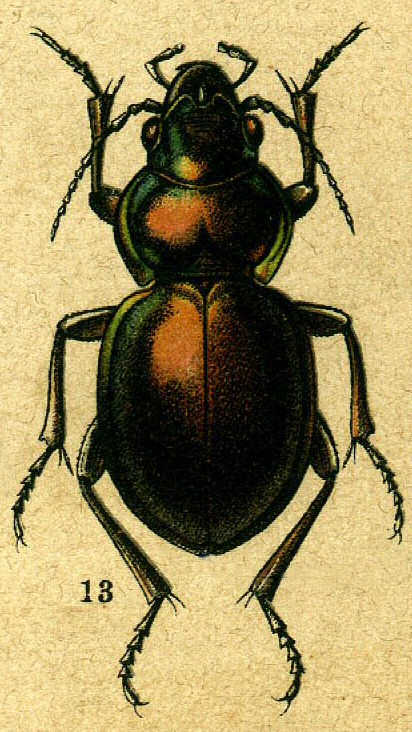
Calosoma elegans in a colour plate from Jacobson 1905–1915

Calosoma elegans is a species of ground beetle in the family Carabidae. It is found in Kazakhstan, Kyrgyzstan, and China.

== Subspecies ==
These five subspecies belong to the species Calosoma elegans:

- Calosoma elegans elegans (Kirsch, 1859) (China and Kazakhstan)
- Calosoma elegans karagaicum (Lapouge, 1924) (Kyrgyzstan)
- Calosoma elegans manderstjernae (Ballion, 1871) (Kazakhstan and Kyrgyzstan)
- Calosoma elegans semenovii (Motschulsky, 1860) (Kazakhstan)
- Calosoma elegans subtilestriatum Mandl, 1954 (China)
