= Calosoma striatulum =

Scientific classification
- Domain: Eukaryota
- Kingdom: Animalia
- Phylum: Arthropoda
- Class: Insecta
- Order: Coleoptera
- Suborder: Adephaga
- Family: Carabidae
- Subfamily: Carabinae
- Tribe: Carabini
- Genus: Calosoma
- Species: C. striatulum

Binomial name
- Calosoma striatulum Chevrolat, 1835

Synonyms
- Calosoma dubitatum Géhin, 1885; Carabomimus libresensis Lassalle, 2009; Calosoma striolatum Géhin, 1885

Species of beetle

Calosoma striatulum is a species in the beetle family Carabidae, found in Mexico. This species is found in Mexico, where it inhabits mountainous areas.

Adults are brachypterous.

== Subspecies ==
These two subspecies belong to the species Calosoma striatulum:

- Calosoma striatulum striatulum (Guerrero, Hidalgo, Puebla, Veracruz) - lined caterpillar hunter
- Calosoma striatulum striatipenne Chaudoir, 1869 (Puebla, Tlaxcala, Veracruz) - furrowed-winged caterpillar hunter
