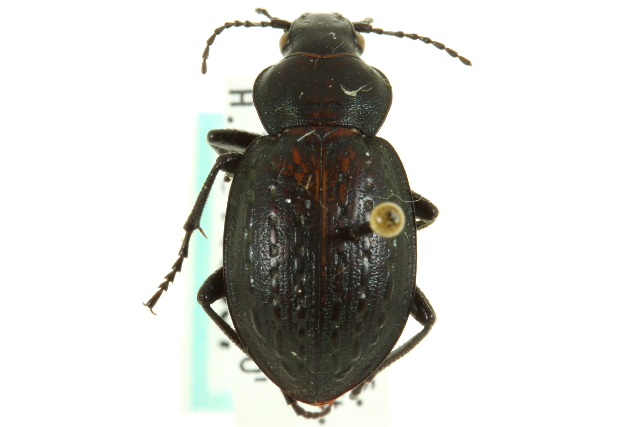

Scientific classification
- Domain: Eukaryota
- Kingdom: Animalia
- Phylum: Arthropoda
- Class: Insecta
- Order: Coleoptera
- Suborder: Adephaga
- Family: Carabidae
- Subfamily: Carabinae
- Tribe: Carabini
- Genus: Calosoma
- Species: C. moniliatum

Binomial name
- Calosoma moniliatum (LeConte, 1852)

Synonyms
- Calosoma moniliatus; Callisthenes (Callistenia) moniliatus LeConte, 1852; Carabus bicolor F.Walker, 1866; Callisthenes concinnus Casey, 1913; Calosoma laqueatum LeConte, 1860; Carabus vancouvericus Csiki, 1927

= Calosoma moniliatum =

Species of beetle

Calosoma moniliatum, the collared beautiful black searcher, is a species in the beetle family Carabidae. It is found in the United States and Canada (Alberta, British Columbia, Saskatchewan, Arizona, California, Idaho, Montana, Nebraska, Oregon, Washington), where it inhabits short grass prairies and dry forests.

Adults are brachypterous.
