= Calosoma breviusculum =

Scientific classification
- Domain: Eukaryota
- Kingdom: Animalia
- Phylum: Arthropoda
- Class: Insecta
- Order: Coleoptera
- Suborder: Adephaga
- Family: Carabidae
- Subfamily: Carabinae
- Tribe: Carabini
- Genus: Calosoma
- Species: C. breviusculum

Binomial name
- Calosoma breviusculum (Mannerheim, 1830)

Synonyms
- Carabus breviusculus Mannerheim, 1830; Callisthenes araraticus Chaudoir, 1846; Callisthenes motschoulskii Fischer von Waldheim, 1842; Callisthenes reichei Guérin-Méneville, 1842; Callisthenes orbiculatus Motschulsky, 1839; Calosoma solskyi Zaitzev, 1918; Calosoma tamerlanum Zaitzev, 1918; Calosoma shelkovnikovi Zaitzev, 1918; Calosoma zarudnianum Semenov & Redikorzev, 1928; Callisthenes substriatus Motschulsky, 1860

Species of ground beetle

Calosoma breviusculum is a species of ground beetle in the family Carabidae. It is found in Turkey, Georgia, Armenia, Iran, and Azerbaijan.

Adults are brachypterous.

== Subspecies ==
These three subspecies belong to the species Calosoma breviusculum:

- Calosoma breviusculum breviusculum (Mannerheim, 1830) (Armenia, Georgia, and Turkey)
- Calosoma breviusculum pumicatum Lapouge, 1907 (Iran)
- Calosoma breviusculum substriatum (Motschulsky, 1860) (Azerbaijan)
