= Calosoma harrarense =

Scientific classification
- Domain: Eukaryota
- Kingdom: Animalia
- Phylum: Arthropoda
- Class: Insecta
- Order: Coleoptera
- Suborder: Adephaga
- Family: Carabidae
- Subfamily: Carabinae
- Tribe: Carabini
- Genus: Calosoma
- Species: C. harrarense

Binomial name
- Calosoma harrarense (Jakobson, 1900)

Synonyms
- Carabops harrarensis Jakobson, 1900; Carabops kovacsi Csiki, 1924

Species of beetle

Calosoma harrarense is a species in the beetle family Carabidae. It is found in Ethiopia, where it inhabits the Che'erch'er mountain range.

Adults reach a length of 16-20 mm and are brachypterous.
