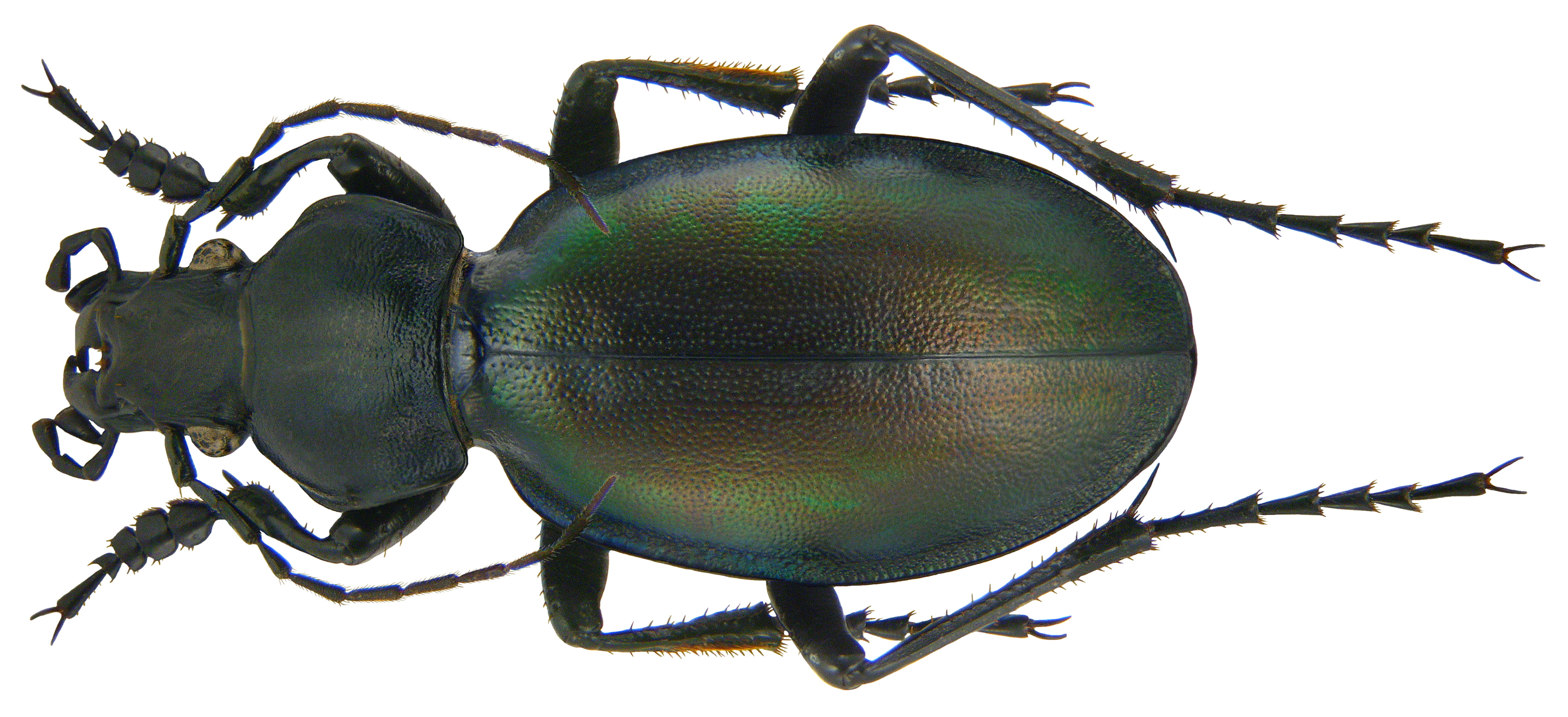

Scientific classification
- Kingdom: Animalia
- Phylum: Arthropoda
- Class: Insecta
- Order: Coleoptera
- Suborder: Adephaga
- Family: Carabidae
- Subfamily: Carabinae
- Tribe: Carabini
- Genus: Carabus
- Species: C. spinolae

Binomial name
- Carabus spinolae Cristoforis & Jan, 1837

Synonyms
- Carabus torosus spinolae Cristoforis & Jan, 1837; Carabus bonplandi Ménétriés, 1837; Carabus lamprus Chaudoir, 1850 "Anatolia"; Carabus phaedimus Schaufuss, 1882 "Amasya"; Carabus obesus Lapouge, 1909 "Tokat"; Carabus mercatii Breuning & Ruspoli, 1970

= Carabus spinolae =

Species of beetle

Carabus spinolae is a species of black-coloured beetle in the family Carabidae that is endemic to Turkey.

== Subspecies ==
These six subspecies belong to the species Carabus spinolae:

- Carabus spinolae drouxi (Machard, 1977) (Turkey)
- Carabus spinolae kocacikanus Mazzi & Cavazzuti, 2014 (Turkey)
- Carabus spinolae kovanliki Cavazzuti, 2014 (Turkey)
- Carabus spinolae leonidas Cavazzuti, 1999 (Turkey)
- Carabus spinolae pseudorouziei Cavazzuti, 2014 (Turkey)
- Carabus spinolae spinolae Cristofori & Jan, 1837 (Turkey)
