= Calosoma fischeri =

Scientific classification
- Kingdom: Animalia
- Phylum: Arthropoda
- Clade: Pancrustacea
- Class: Insecta
- Order: Coleoptera
- Suborder: Adephaga
- Family: Carabidae
- Genus: Calosoma
- Species: C. fischeri

Binomial name
- Calosoma fischeri (Fischer, 1842)

Synonyms
- Callisthenes fischeri Fischer von Waldheim, 1842

Species of beetle

Calosoma fischeri is a species of ground beetle in the subfamily of Carabinae. It was described by Fischer in 1842. This species is found in Mongolia.

Adults reach a length of 17-21 mm and are brachypterous.
