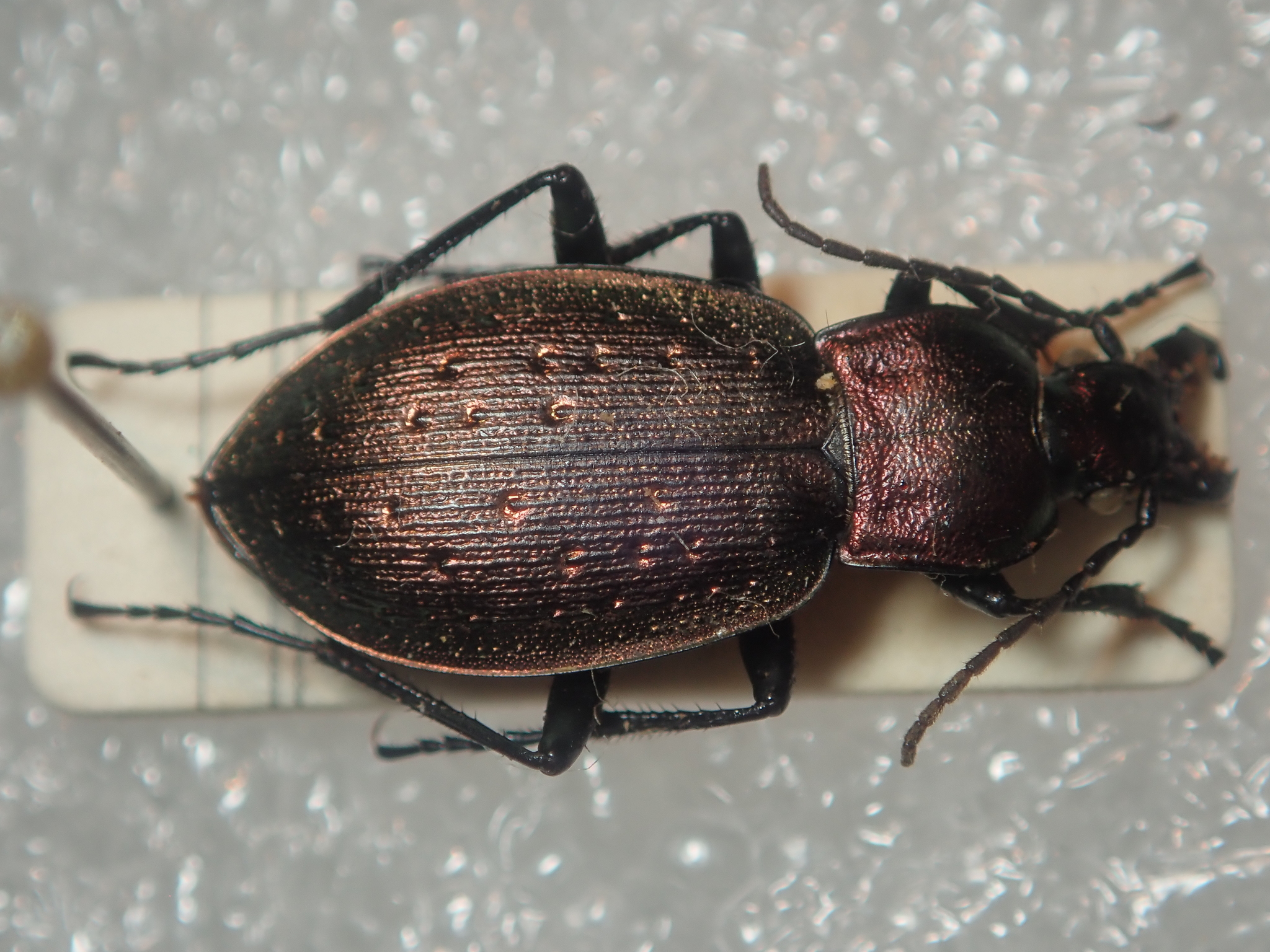
- Carabus bremii, Italy

Scientific classification
- Domain: Eukaryota
- Kingdom: Animalia
- Phylum: Arthropoda
- Class: Insecta
- Order: Coleoptera
- Suborder: Adephaga
- Family: Carabidae
- Subfamily: Carabinae
- Tribe: Carabini
- Genus: Carabus
- Species: C. bremii

Binomial name
- Carabus bremii Stierlin, 1881

Synonyms
- Carabus latreilleanus Csiki, 1927

= Carabus bremii =

Species of beetle

Carabus bremii is a species of ground beetle in the family Carabidae. It is found in Italy.
