= Carabus paraysi =

Scientific classification
- Domain: Eukaryota
- Kingdom: Animalia
- Phylum: Arthropoda
- Class: Insecta
- Order: Coleoptera
- Suborder: Adephaga
- Family: Carabidae
- Subfamily: Carabinae
- Tribe: Carabini
- Genus: Carabus
- Species: C. paraysi

Binomial name
- Carabus paraysi Palliardi, 1825

Synonyms
- Carabus parraysi Palliardi, 1825; Carabus parraysii Palliardi, 1825; Carabus parreyssii Palliardi, 1825

Species of beetle

Carabus paraysi is a species of ground beetle in the family Carabidae. It is found in eastern Europe.

== Subspecies ==
These two subspecies belong to the species Carabus paraysi:

- Carabus paraysi paraysi Palliardi, 1825
- Carabus paraysi plassensis Born, 1907
