= Calosoma cicatricosum =

Scientific classification
- Domain: Eukaryota
- Kingdom: Animalia
- Phylum: Arthropoda
- Class: Insecta
- Order: Coleoptera
- Suborder: Adephaga
- Family: Carabidae
- Genus: Calosoma
- Species: C. cicatricosum

Binomial name
- Calosoma cicatricosum Chaudoir, 1869

Synonyms
- Calosoma balli Rotger, 1976

Species of beetle

Calosoma cicatricosum, the scarred caterpillar hunter, is a species of ground beetle in the subfamily of Carabinae. It was described by Maximilien Chaudoir in 1869. This species is found in Mexico (Distrito Federal, México), where it inhabits upland areas and mountains.

Adults are brachypterous.
