= Carabus hemprichii =

Scientific classification
- Kingdom: Animalia
- Phylum: Arthropoda
- Class: Insecta
- Order: Coleoptera
- Suborder: Adephaga
- Family: Carabidae
- Subfamily: Carabinae
- Tribe: Carabini
- Genus: Carabus
- Species: C. hemprichii

Binomial name
- Carabus hemprichii Dejean, 1826

Synonyms
- Carabus hemprichi

Species of beetle

Carabus hemprichii is a species of ground beetle in the family Carabidae. It is found in Israel, Lebanon, Syria, and Turkey.

== Subspecies ==
These six subspecies belong to the species Carabus hemprichii:

- Carabus hemprichii cheikhermonensis Deuve, 1992 (Israel and Lebanon)
- Carabus hemprichii damascenus Lapouge, 1925 (Israel and Syria)
- Carabus hemprichii elonensis Schweiger, 1970 (Israel)
- Carabus hemprichii hemprichii Dejean, 1826 (Lebanon and Syria)
- Carabus hemprichii kairouzi A.Müller, 2008 (Lebanon)
- Carabus hemprichii propheta Rapuzzi, 1995 (Turkey)
