= Calosoma oberthueri =

Scientific classification
- Domain: Eukaryota
- Kingdom: Animalia
- Phylum: Arthropoda
- Class: Insecta
- Order: Coleoptera
- Suborder: Adephaga
- Family: Carabidae
- Subfamily: Carabinae
- Tribe: Carabini
- Genus: Calosoma
- Species: C. oberthueri

Binomial name
- Calosoma oberthueri Vuillet, 1910

Synonyms
- Calosoma oberthuri

Species of beetle

Calosoma oberthueri is a species in the beetle family Carabidae. It is found in Angola.

Adults reach a length of 30-35 mm and are brachypterous.

== Etymology ==
The species is named for French entomologist René Oberthür.
