= Calosoma orizabae =

Scientific classification
- Domain: Eukaryota
- Kingdom: Animalia
- Phylum: Arthropoda
- Class: Insecta
- Order: Coleoptera
- Suborder: Adephaga
- Family: Carabidae
- Genus: Calosoma
- Species: C. orizabae

Binomial name
- Calosoma orizabae Jeannel, 1940

Synonyms
- Carabomimus orizabae Jeannel, 1940

Species of beetle

Calosoma orizabae, the Orizaba caterpillar hunter, is a species of ground beetle in the subfamily of Carabinae. It was described by Jeannel in 1940. This species is found in Mexico (Veracruz), where it inhabits upland areas.

Adults are brachypterous.
