= Calosoma atrovirens =

Scientific classification
- Domain: Eukaryota
- Kingdom: Animalia
- Phylum: Arthropoda
- Class: Insecta
- Order: Coleoptera
- Suborder: Adephaga
- Family: Carabidae
- Genus: Calosoma
- Species: C. atrovirens

Binomial name
- Calosoma atrovirens Chaudoir, 1869

Synonyms
- Calosoma explanaticolle Bates, 1891; Calosoma obscurum Géhin, 1885

Species of beetle

Calosoma atrovirens is a species of ground beetle in the subfamily of Carabinae. It was described by Maximilien Chaudoir in 1869. This species is found in Mexico, where it inhabits oak forests, tropical deciduous forests and wet pastures.

Adults are brachypterous.

== Subspecies ==
- Calosoma atrovirens atrovirens - (Hidalgo, San Luis Potosi, Tamaulipas) blackish-green caterpillar hunter
- Calosoma atrovirens explanaticolle Bates, 1891 (Distrito Federal, Guanajuato, Jalisco, Michoacan, Oaxaca, Puebla, Queretaro, Zacatecas) - broad-necked caterpillar hunter
