= Calosoma laeve =

Scientific classification
- Kingdom: Animalia
- Phylum: Arthropoda
- Class: Insecta
- Order: Coleoptera
- Suborder: Adephaga
- Family: Carabidae
- Genus: Calosoma
- Species: C. laeve

Binomial name
- Calosoma laeve Dejean, 1826

Synonyms
- Calosoma chevrolatii Dejean, 1836

Species of beetle

Calosoma laeve, Dejean's caterpillar hunter, is a species of ground beetle in the subfamily of Carabinae. It was described by Pierre François Marie Auguste Dejean in 1826. This species is found in Mexico (Chihuahua, Distrito Federal, Hidalgo, Jalisco, Neuvo Leon, México, Michoacan, Morelos, Puebla, Tamaulipas, Veracruz), where it is found in upland areas near water.

Adults are brachypterous.
