= Carabus janatai =

Scientific classification
- Domain: Eukaryota
- Kingdom: Animalia
- Phylum: Arthropoda
- Class: Insecta
- Order: Coleoptera
- Suborder: Adephaga
- Family: Carabidae
- Subfamily: Carabinae
- Tribe: Carabini
- Genus: Carabus
- Species: C. janatai

Binomial name
- Carabus janatai Brezina, 1996

Synonyms
- Carabus pingpong

Species of beetle

Carabus janatai is a species in the beetle family Carabidae. It is found in China.

== Subspecies ==
These four subspecies belong to the species Carabus janatai:

- Carabus janatai futrinka Deuve & Kalab, 2009
- Carabus janatai hongxingensis Deuve & Kalab, 2013
- Carabus janatai janatai Brezina, 1996
- Carabus janatai pingpong Brezina & Häckel, 2004 (Gansu province, China)
