= Calosoma leleuporum =

Scientific classification
- Domain: Eukaryota
- Kingdom: Animalia
- Phylum: Arthropoda
- Class: Insecta
- Order: Coleoptera
- Suborder: Adephaga
- Family: Carabidae
- Genus: Calosoma
- Species: C. leleuporum

Binomial name
- Calosoma leleuporum (Basilewsky, 1968)

Synonyms
- Castrida leleuporum Basilewsky, 1968

Species of beetle

Calosoma leleuporum, Leleup's caterpillar hunter, is a species of ground beetle in the subfamily of Carabinae. It was described by Basilewsky in 1968. This species is found on the Galapagos Islands, where it is found beneath Miconia shrubs in grasslands and also in Sphagnum bogs.

Adults are brachypterous and gregarious and hibernate deep in the soil.
