= Carabus vladsimirskyi =

Scientific classification
- Kingdom: Animalia
- Phylum: Arthropoda
- Class: Insecta
- Order: Coleoptera
- Suborder: Adephaga
- Family: Carabidae
- Subfamily: Carabinae
- Tribe: Carabini
- Genus: Carabus
- Species: C. vladsimirskyi

Binomial name
- Carabus vladsimirskyi Dejean, 1830

Synonyms
- Carabus vladimirskyi

Species of insect

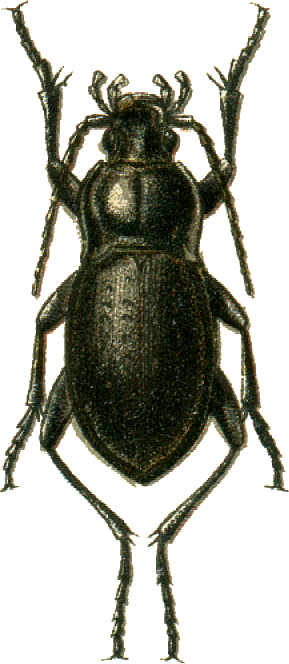

Carabus vladsimirskyi is a species of ground beetle in the family Carabidae. It is found in China, Russia, and Mongolia.

== Subspecies ==
These three subspecies belong to the species Carabus vladsimirskyi:

- Carabus vladsimirskyi pachypterus Imura, 1999 (China, Mongolia, and Russia)
- Carabus vladsimirskyi tianzhuiensis Cavazzuti, 2008 (China)
- Carabus vladsimirskyi vladsimirskyi Dejean, 1830 (China, Mongolia, and Russia)
