= Carabus rothii =

Scientific classification
- Kingdom: Animalia
- Phylum: Arthropoda
- Class: Insecta
- Order: Coleoptera
- Suborder: Adephaga
- Family: Carabidae
- Subfamily: Carabinae
- Tribe: Carabini
- Genus: Carabus
- Species: C. rothii

Binomial name
- Carabus rothii Dejean, 1829

Synonyms
- Carabus rothi

Species of beetle

Carabus rothii is a species of ground beetle in the family Carabidae, found in Eastern Europe.

== Subspecies ==
These five subspecies belong to the species Carabus rothii:

- Carabus rothii alutensis Savulescu, 1972 (Romania)
- Carabus rothii comptus Dejean, 1831 (Romania)
- Carabus rothii hampei Küster, 1846 (Hungary, Romania, and Ukraine)
- Carabus rothii incompsus Kraatz, 1880 (Romania)
- Carabus rothii rothii Dejean, 1829 (Romania)
