= Bischofite =

Halide mineral of magnesium (Mg) chloride

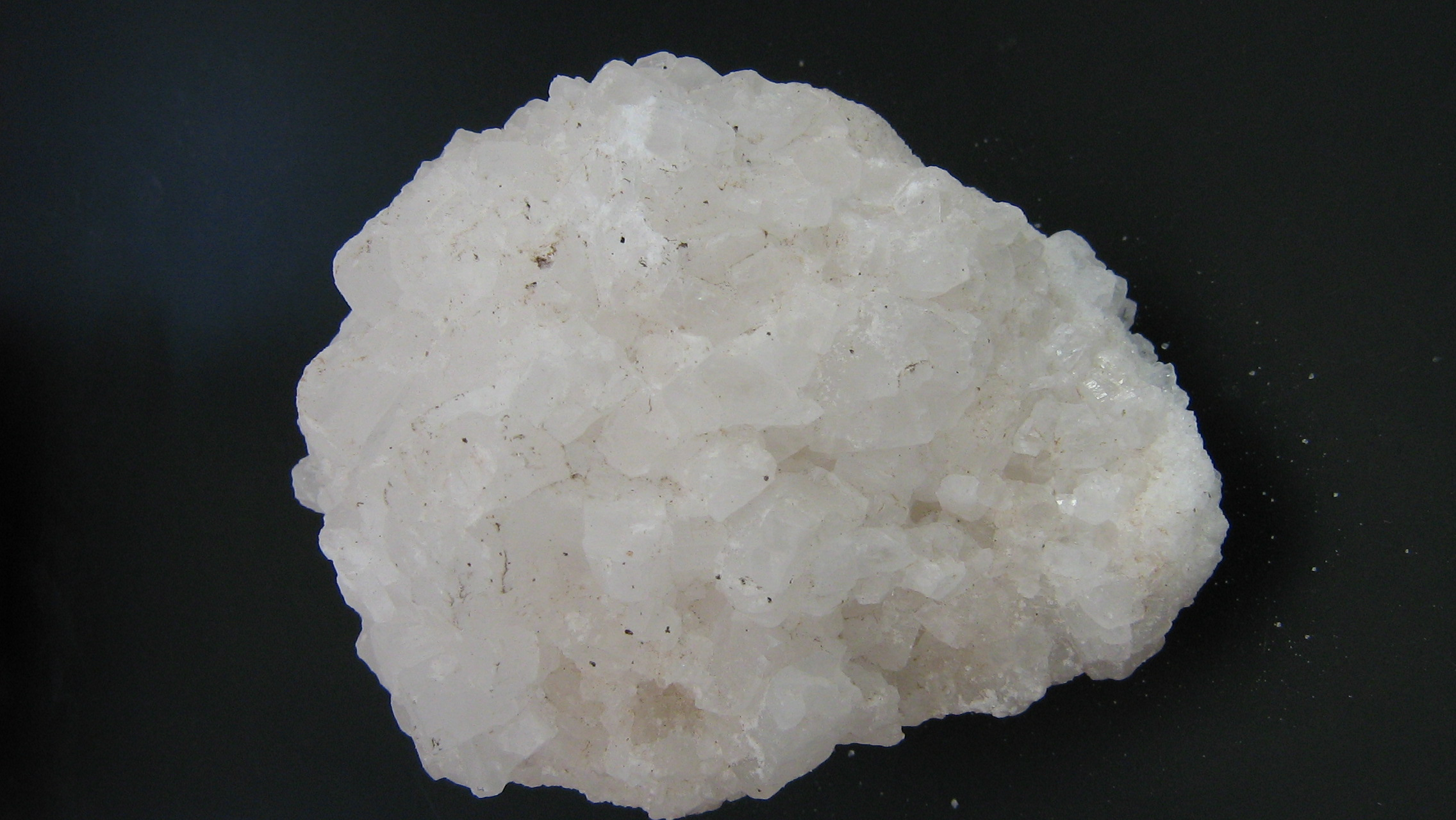
- Bischofite from Antofagasta, Chile

General
- Category: Halide mineral
- Formula: MgCl_{2}·6H_{2}O
- IMA symbol: Bsf
- Strunz classification: 3.BB.15
- Dana classification: 09.02.09.01
- Crystal system: Monoclinic
- Crystal class: Prismatic (2/m) (same H-M symbol)
- Space group: C2/m

Identification
- Color: Colorless to white
- Crystal habit: Fibrous to massive
- Twinning: polysynthetic
- Cleavage: None
- Fracture: Conchoidal to uneven
- Mohs scale hardness: 1.5–2
- Luster: Vitreous – greasy
- Streak: White
- Diaphaneity: Translucent to transparent
- Specific gravity: 1.56
- Optical properties: Biaxial (+)
- Refractive index: n_{α} = 1.495 n_{β} = 1.507 n_{γ} = 1.528
- Solubility: Deliquescent

Bischofite is a hydrous magnesium chloride mineral with formula MgCl_{2}·6H_{2}O. It belongs to halides and is a sea salt concentrate. It contains many macro- and micro-elements vital for human health, in much higher concentrations than can be found in sea or ocean salt. The main bischofite compound is magnesium chloride (up to 350 g/L), moreover, it contains about 70 other elements as impurities, including potassium, sodium, bromine, boron, calcium, silicon, molybdenum, silver, zinc, iron and copper.

== History ==
Bischofite is named in honor of German geologist Gustav Bischof (1792–1870). Its discovery (1877) is attributed to Carl Christian Ochsenius.

At its type locality bischofite is an evaporite formed in an ancient seabed, which was deposited more than 200 million years ago, during the Permian Period. Its composition can be explained by the high content of magnesium chloride in the primordial ocean.

In 1930–1950, vast bischofite deposits were discovered near the Volga River in Russia. The mineral is mined by dissolving an underground dry mineral stratum with artesian water. The resulting brine is pumped out.

== Deposits ==
Bischofite deposits differ by their composition: some of them are salt basins where bischofite is mixed with other minerals such as carnallite, halite, kieserite and anhydrite. These are the so-called bischofite containing rocks which have pink-brown-yellow and orange-red colors. They contain 36–58% of bischofite. Carnallite deposits are known in Staßfurt, Germany – where bischofite was first discovered, and carnallite is one of the most important minerals in potassium salt deposits (Solykam deposit, Ural, Russia). Sub-surface bischofite layers were also discovered in Kazakhstan, Turkmenistan, China and the US.

There are bischofite-rich deposits with concentrations of 93–96% of the mineral. One of those rare deposits is located in the Volgograd region of Russia. Another one was found in 1990s in the Poltava region in Ukraine. This is one of the deepest (2.5 km [1.6 mi]) and oldest bischofite deposits.

== Applications ==
Bischofite has many applications ranging from construction materials (tile, stone) to agriculture (preplant seeds, plant processing during vegetation period), oil extraction (for grouting and solidifying mortars), medical and chemical industry (production of magnesium metal).

Bischofite is used in form of compresses to treat joint diseases such as arthritis, rheumatic fever osteoarthritis, rheumatoid arthritis, radiculitis, calcaneal spur and traumas, especially in rehabilitation centers in Ukraine, Russia, Belarus, and Lithuania. Bischofite is also applied in gel form.

Bischofite is used in the production of the industrial Sorel cement and synthetic carnallite. Bischofite solution is applied to deice roads, similar to sodium chloride, but it is less corrosive. It is also used in agriculture, veterinary medicine and cattle breeding to increase the crop yield and treat animals.
