= Calosoma abbreviatum =

Scientific classification
- Domain: Eukaryota
- Kingdom: Animalia
- Phylum: Arthropoda
- Class: Insecta
- Order: Coleoptera
- Suborder: Adephaga
- Family: Carabidae
- Genus: Calosoma
- Species: C. abbreviatum

Binomial name
- Calosoma abbreviatum Chaudoir, 1869

Synonyms
- Calosoma abbreviatum Breuning, 1927; Caminara abbreviata Lapouge, 1932; Castrida abbreviatum Jeannel, 1940; Calosoma abbreviatum Gidaspow, 1963

Species of beetle

Calosoma abbreviatum, short caterpillar hunter, is a species of ground beetle in the subfamily of Carabinae. It was described by Chaudoir in 1869 and is found in Bolivia, Columbia, Ecuador, and Peru.

== Description ==
The species is 23–26 millimetres (0.91–1.02 in) long and is of dark bronze colour with yellow spots on its prothorax. Pronotum is twice as long and wide and is narrowed. Males have rounded metatrochanter which is also pointed at the tip.

== Distribution ==
In Ecuador, the C. abbreviatum can be found only in Manabí Province while in Peru it is found in only in one type locality which is Tumbes. The anterior tarsus is missing from the male species.

== Habitat ==
The species is found on an altitude of 3–110 metres (9.8–360.9 ft) in lowlands and hills. Adults fly for January to April and from November to December.
