= Calosoma pentheri =

Scientific classification
- Domain: Eukaryota
- Kingdom: Animalia
- Phylum: Arthropoda
- Class: Insecta
- Order: Coleoptera
- Suborder: Adephaga
- Family: Carabidae
- Genus: Calosoma
- Species: C. pentheri

Binomial name
- Calosoma pentheri Apfelbeck, 1918

Species of beetle

Calosoma pentheri is a species of ground beetle in the subfamily of Carabinae. It was described by Apfelbeck in 1918. This species is found in southern Montenegro and northern Albania.

Adults reach a length of 15-17 mm, are brachypterous and have a bronze or greenish colour with cupric foveae.

== Etymology ==
The species is named for Austrian naturalist Arnold Penther.
