= Gustav Bischof =

German geologist and chemist (1792-1870)

- Born: Karl Gustav Bischof; 18 January 1792; Nuremberg, Bavaria
- Died: 30 November 1870 (aged 78); Bonn, Germany
- Education: Erlangen
- Known for: Chemical geology Wood gasifier
- Awards: Wollaston Medal (1868)
- Scientific career
- Fields: Chemical geology
- Workplaces: University of Bonn

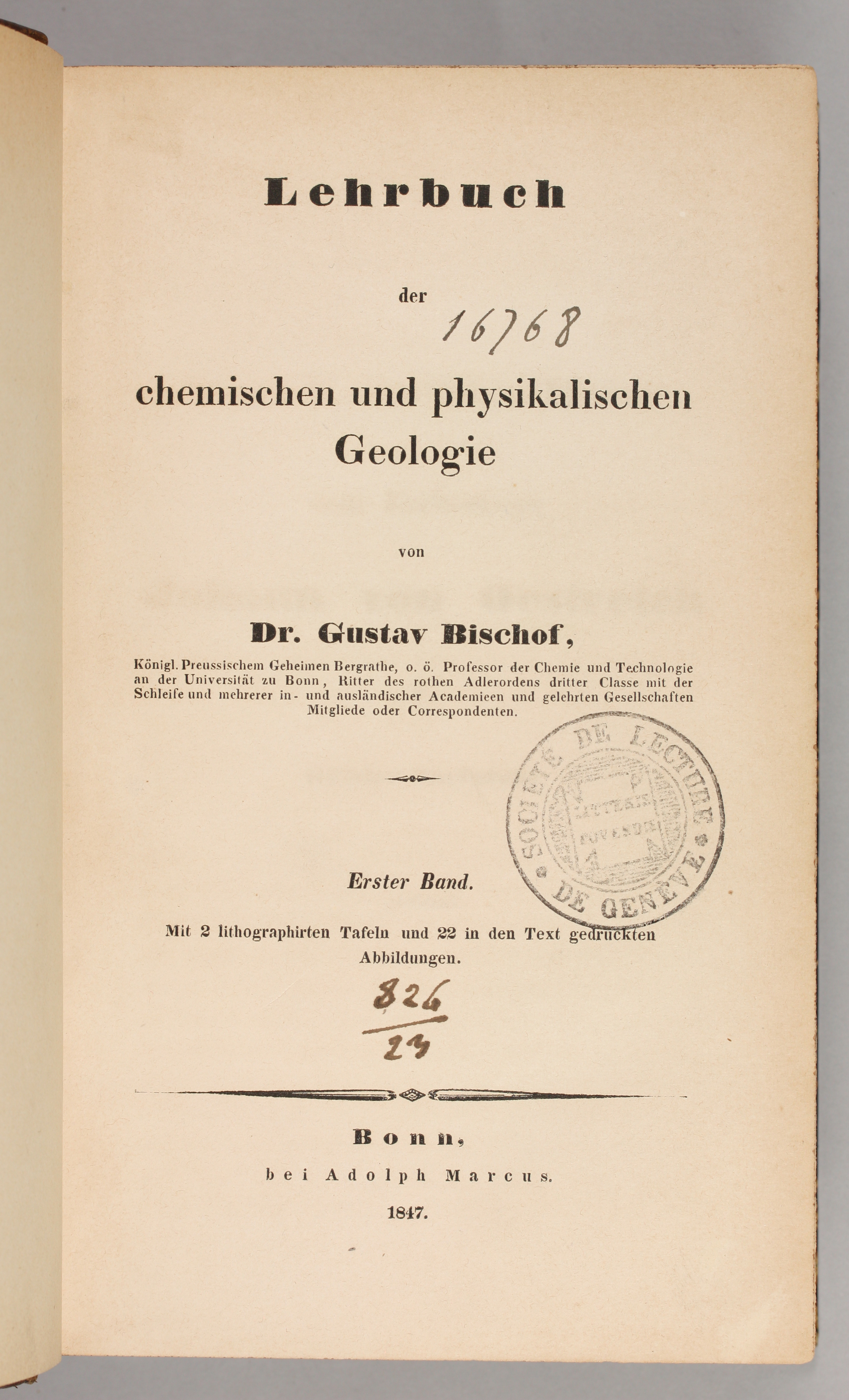
Lehrbuch der chemischen und physikalischen geologie, 1847-1854

Karl Gustav Bischof (18 January 1792 – 30 November 1870) was a German chemist, born in Nuremberg. He studied at Erlangen where he became a university lecturer ("Privatdozent") in 1815. In 1819 he was appointed to the position of an extra-Ordinary Professor of Chemistry at Bonn, and in 1822 to that of a full professor. The University of Bonn was a leading center for geologists including Ferdinand von Roemer, Georg August Goldfuss, and Gerhard vom Rath as well as Bischof.

== Scientific achievements ==
Bischof himself has been considered the founder of chemical geology. More a chemist than a geologist, he introduced chemical analysis into widespread use in geology. His Lehrbuch der chemischen und physikalischen Geologie (Bonn: Marcus, 1847−1866) was the standard text of geochemistry and a classic reference work. The first volume (in two parts) considers the actions of water both on the earth and internal to it, including the temperature, chemical composition and effects of springs on rocks around them. His was the first account to scientifically address springs. Volume II (in 7 parts) discusses mineralogy, petrology, and the origin of rocks. He describes the chemical composition, structure, texture, and the chemical and mechanical forces involved in the decomposition of minerals and rocks, including the effects of decomposing organic remains. In doing so, he created a new branch of geology. Bischof's work was highly valuable for its extensive and careful chemical analyses. Bischof was less successful in the interpretations he placed on his results, as he supported theories of Neptunism, later disproved.

Addressing dynamical geology, he noted that substances such as carbonic acid, hydrochloric acid, and other gases as well as water vapor played a part in volcanic eruptions. By studying the cooling of large balls of melted basalt, Bischof estimated the possible cooling time of the planet earth, arriving at a value of 350 million years. He also experimented with variations in cooling temperature, observing that manipulations of temperature and pressure during cooling could lead to the formation of different crystalline forms. He suggested that the both asphalt and petroleum were likely derived from decaying plant matter, and predicted that the effects of air, heat and pressure might explain the formation of different types of coal. He studied experimented on inflammable gases such as those found in coal mines. He experimented with the development of safety-lamps and wrote an essay on the avoidance of explosions in mines.

== Awards ==
In 1859, Bischof was elected as member of the Bavarian Academy of Sciences. Bischof was awarded the Wollaston Medal in 1863 by the Geological Society of London. The society's highest award, it is given for "significant influence by means of a substantial body of excellent research in either or both pure and applied aspects of the science" of geology.

Gustav Bischof died in Bonn on 30 November 1870.

== See also ==
- Bischofite
