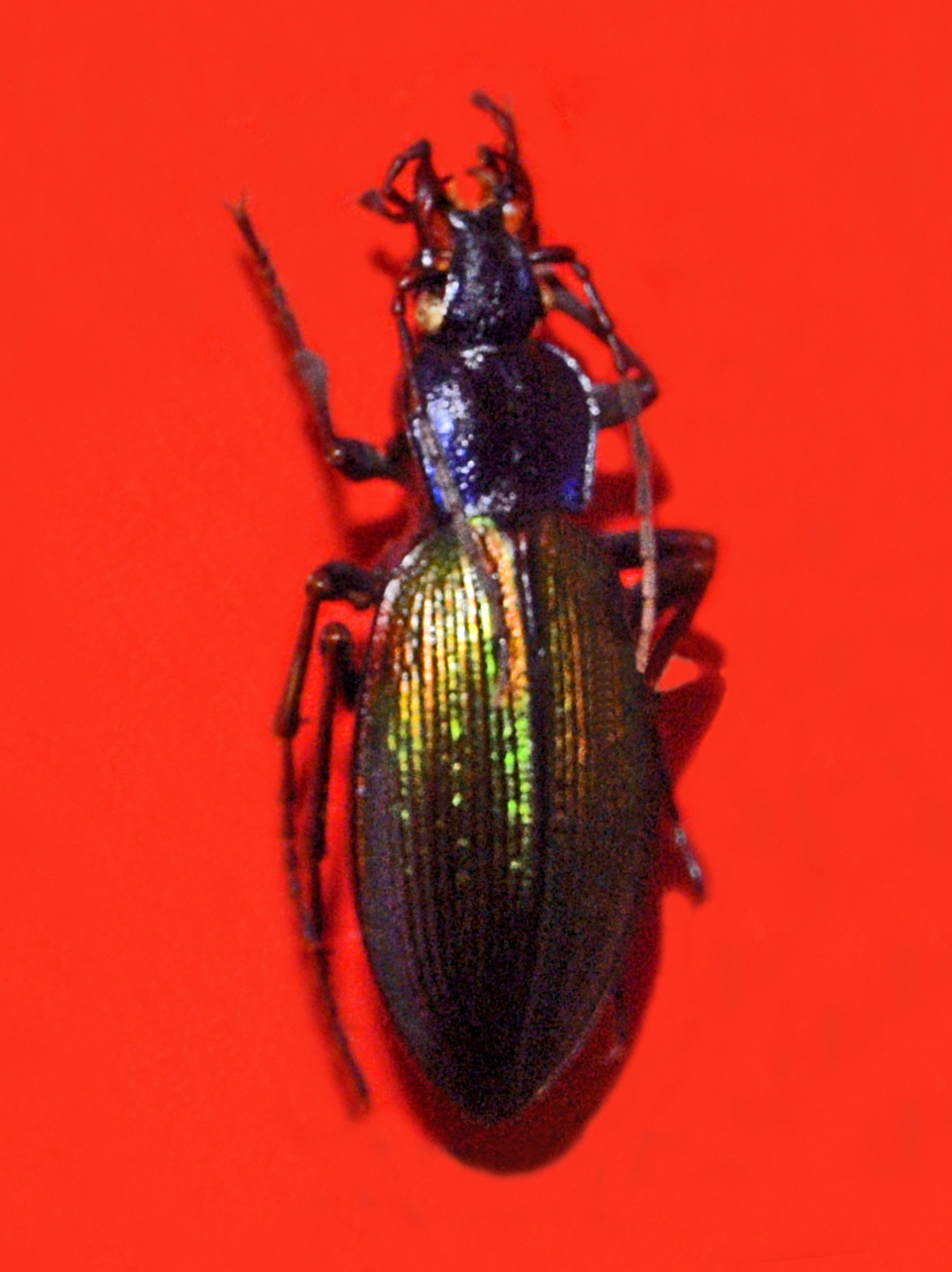
- Museum specimen of Ceroglossus chilensis

Scientific classification
- Kingdom: Animalia
- Phylum: Arthropoda
- Clade: Pancrustacea
- Class: Insecta
- Order: Coleoptera
- Suborder: Adephaga
- Family: Carabidae
- Genus: Ceroglossus
- Species: C. chilensis

Binomial name
- Ceroglossus chilensis (Escholtz, 1829)

Synonyms
- Carabus chilensis Eschscholtz, 1829; Carabus coerulens Faz, 1925; Carabus jaffueli Faz, 1925; Carabus percuprinus Faz, 1925; Carabus subviridis Faz, 1925; Carabus viridis Faz, 1925; Ceroglossus chilenicus Kraatz-Koschlau, 1888; Ceroglossus victoriensis Dallas, 1933; Ceroglossus lossbergi Kraatz-Koschlau, 1888; Ceroglossus ignitus Géhin, 1885; Carabus colchaguensis Reed, 1875; Carabus germanus Faz, 1925; Ceroglossus incertus Kraatz-Koschlau, 1888; Ceroglossus pyrilampes A.Morawitz, 1886; Ceroglossus debilicostis Dallas, 1933; Ceroglossus porteri Dallas, 1929; Ceroglossus mallecoanus Lapouge, 1928; Carabus diversicostatus Dallas, 1927; Carabus aeneovirescens Faz, 1925; Carabus aeneus Faz, 1925; Ceroglossus temucensis Kraatz-Koschlau, 1890; Ceroglossus dorsosolutus A.Morawitz, 1886; Ceroglossus pradieri Géhin, 1885; Ceroglossus unicostulatus Géhin, 1885; Ceroglossus carinulatus Motschulsky, 1866; Ceroglossus splendidus Breuning, 1943; Ceroglossus dynastes Born, 1898; Carabus mochae Reed, 1874; Carabus aequicostatus Faz, 1925; Carabus conchyliatus Géhin, 1875; Ceroglossus araucanus Lapouge, 1928; Carabus plagiarus Faz, 1925; Carabus ruizi Faz, 1925; Ceroglossus hypocrita Kraatz-Koschlau, 1887; Ceroglossus viridiobscurus Breuning, 1943; Carabus capuccinus Faz, 1925; Carabus reedjuniori Faz, 1925

= Ceroglossus chilensis =

Species of beetle

Ceroglossus chilensis, the Chilean magnificent beetle, is a species of beetle of the family Carabidae.

== Subspecies ==
- Ceroglossus chilensis angolicus Kraatz-Koschlau, 1888
- Ceroglossus chilensis chilensis Escholtz, 1829
- Ceroglossus chilensis colchaguensis Reed, 1875
- Ceroglossus chilensis cyanicollis Kraatz, 1887
- Ceroglossus chilensis drumonti Jiroux, 2008
- Ceroglossus chilensis evenoui Jiroux, 1996
- Ceroglossus chilensis fallaciosus Kraatz, 1880
- Ceroglossus chilensis ficheti Jiroux, 1996
- Ceroglossus chilensis galvezi Jaffrézic & Rataj, 2006
- Ceroglossus chilensis germaini Jiroux, 1996
- Ceroglossus chilensis gloriosus Gerstaecker, 1858
- Ceroglossus chilensis jaffrezici Jiroux, 2006
- Ceroglossus chilensis keithi Jiroux, 1997
- Ceroglossus chilensis kraatzianus Morawitz, 1886
- Ceroglossus chilensis latemarginatus Kraatz-Koschlau, 1889
- Ceroglossus chilensis legrandi Heinz & Jiroux, 2001
- Ceroglossus chilensis meridionalis Heinz & Jiroux, 2001
- Ceroglossus chilensis mochae (Reed, 1874)
- Ceroglossus chilensis nigritulus Mandl, 1977
- Ceroglossus chilensis pseudopatagonensis Heinz & Jiroux, 2001
- Ceroglossus chilensis pseudovillaricensis Jiroux & Ugarte Peňa, 2006
- Ceroglossus chilensis rataji Jiroux, 2006
- Ceroglossus chilensis resplendens Jaffrézic & Rataj, 2006
- Ceroglossus chilensis sculpturatus Jiroux & Rataj, 2006
- Ceroglossus chilensis seladonicus Kraatz-Koschlau, 1887
- Ceroglossus chilensis solieri Roeschke, 1900
- Ceroglossus chilensis villaricensis Kraatz-Koschlau, 1885

== Description ==
Ceroglossus chilensis can reach a body length of about 25–32 millimetres (0.98–1.26 in). This species presents a marked sexual dimorphism as males have a wider proepisternum than females, while females have wider abdominal sternites. These beetles show also chromatic polymorphism, great genetic variations and morphological variability in shape and in size depending on subspecies and populations. Body color may be metallic green, brown, reddish or bluish.

== Distribution and habitat ==
This species can be found in Chile and it is the most widespread Ceroglossus in the area. It mainly lives in native forests, in surrounding exotic plantations and in plantations of Pinus radiata.
