= Carl Ochsenius =

German geologist and mining engineer (1830–1906)

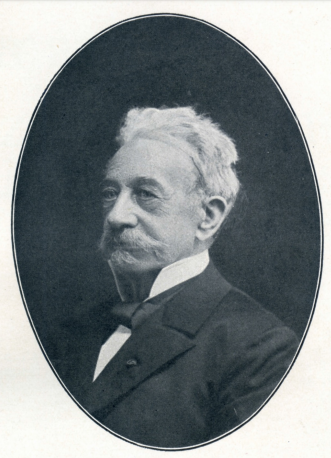

Carl Christian Ochsenius (9 March 1830 – 9 December 1906) was a German geologist and mining engineer who worked extensively in South America. He came up with the "bar theory" to explain the pattern of salt and gypsum deposits.

== Biography ==
Ochsenius was born in Kassel where his father worked in the court. Educated at the Gymnasium he joined the Polytechnic school to study mining and geology. Recommended by Robert Bunsen, he joined an expedition to Chile in 1851 with Rudolf Amandus Philippi and stayed on there to study mineral deposits. He worked in Chile until 1869. He was a partner of the mining engineer Matías Cousiño in Lota. He also collected natural history specimens in this period and several species have been named after him including the beetle Ceroglossus ochsenii and the plant Abutilon ochsenii. He also visited north Africa in 1866 and Italy in 1869. He served as a German Consul for Peru and Chile in 1874. He lost his savings when the bank he invested in went bankrupt. He settled in Marburg from 1871 and married Luise, Rau von Holzhausen in 1879. He was a co-founder of a Masonic Lodge in Marburg. He published a book Chile Land und Leute in 1906 and wrote a biography of Philippi just before his death.

== Geology ==
His major work was Die Bildung der Steinsalzlager und ihrer Mutterlaugensalze (1877) in which he suggested that salt deposits were formed in lagoons separated from the ocean by bars. He received an honorary doctorate from the University of Marburg in 1884.
