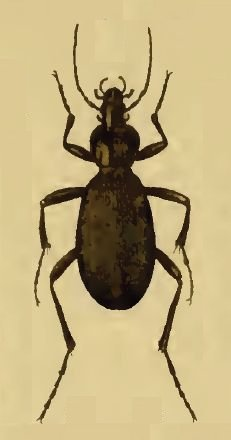

Scientific classification
- Kingdom: Animalia
- Phylum: Arthropoda
- Clade: Pancrustacea
- Class: Insecta
- Order: Coleoptera
- Suborder: Adephaga
- Family: Carabidae
- Genus: Aplothorax; Waterhouse, 1841
- Species: A. burchelli

Binomial name
- Aplothorax burchelli Waterhouse, 1841

= Aplothorax =

Genus and species of beetles

Aplothorax burchelli is a species of beetle in the family Carabidae, the only species in the genus Aplothorax. It is endemic to the island of Saint Helena in the South Atlantic. The genus has been found to be nested within Calosoma by phylogenomic analysis. It has not been seen since 1966-1967 and may now be extinct.
