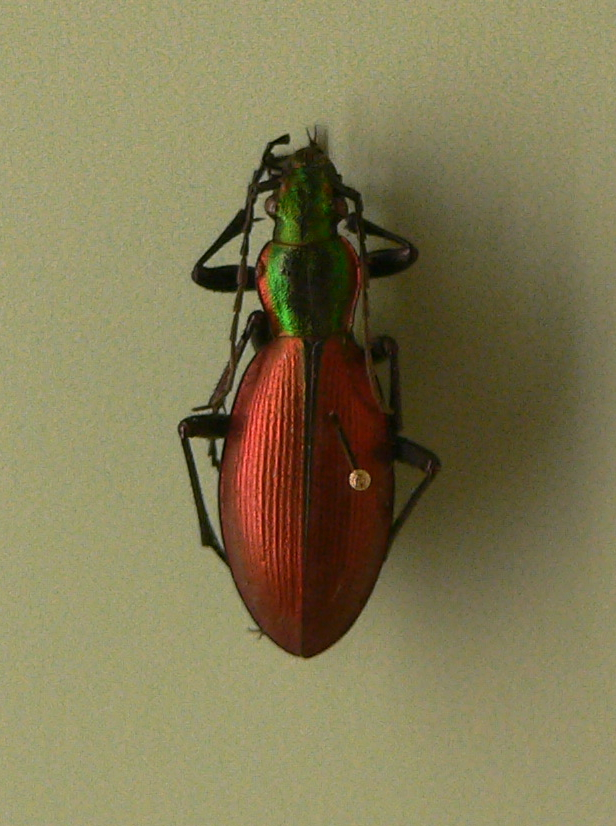

Scientific classification
- Domain: Eukaryota
- Kingdom: Animalia
- Phylum: Arthropoda
- Class: Insecta
- Order: Coleoptera
- Suborder: Adephaga
- Family: Carabidae
- Genus: Ceroglossus
- Species: C. darwini

Binomial name
- Ceroglossus darwini (Hope, 1837)

Synonyms
- Carabus darwini Hope, 1837; Ceroglossus minutissimus Mandl, 1975; Ceroglossus auroviridis Breuning, 1943; Ceroglossus chonchicus Kraatz-Koschlau, 1887; Ceroglossus disputatus Kraatz, 1887; Ceroglossus opacus Kraatz, 1887; Ceroglossus bimarginatus Kraatz-Koschlau, 1886; Ceroglossus melanopterus Gerstaecker, 1858; Ceroglossus indiconotus Solier, 1849

= Ceroglossus darwini =

Species of beetle

Ceroglossus darwini is a species of beetle in the family Carabidae. Eight subspecies are currently recognized. The species is found in Chile and Argentina.

== Subspecies ==
- Ceroglossus darwini coloanei Jiroux, 1997
- Ceroglossus darwini darwini (Hope, 1838)
- Ceroglossus darwini heinzi Jaffrezic & Rataj, 2006
- Ceroglossus darwini jirouxi Deuve, 1995
- Ceroglossus darwini mequignoni Heinz & Jiroux, 2001
- Ceroglossus darwini patagoniensis Breuning, 1931
- Ceroglossus darwini reedi A.Morawitz, 1886
- Ceroglossus darwini ugartei Jiroux, 2006
