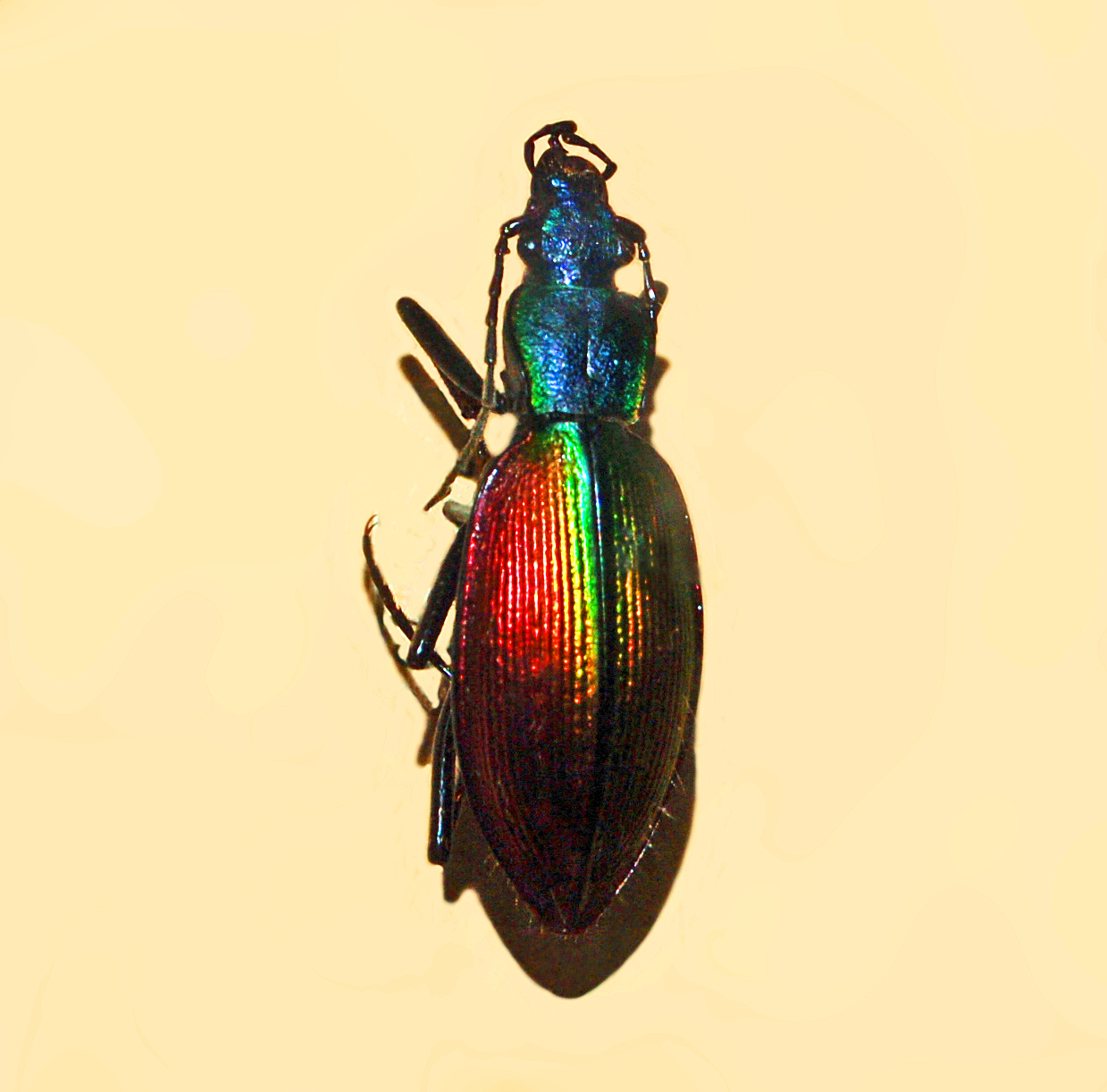
- Ceroglossus buqueti from Chile.

Scientific classification
- Kingdom: Animalia
- Phylum: Arthropoda
- Clade: Pancrustacea
- Class: Insecta
- Order: Coleoptera
- Suborder: Adephaga
- Family: Carabidae
- Genus: Ceroglossus
- Species: C. buqueti

Binomial name
- Ceroglossus buqueti (Laporte de Castelnau, 1834)

Synonyms
- Carabus buqueti Laporte, 1834; Carabus cyaneus Faz, 1925; Carabus salbachi Faz, 1925; Ceroglossus confusus Kraatz, 1887; Ceroglossus valdivianus A.Morawitz, 1886; Carabus chilensis Guérin-Méneville, 1835; Carabus chiloensis Hope, 1838; Ceroglossus penai Dorsselaer, 1955; Carabus claudii Faz, 1925; Carabus porteri Faz, 1925; Ceroglossus castroensis Kraatz-Koschlau, 1886; Ceroglossus monttianus A.Morawitz, 1886; Ceroglossus punctulatus A.Morawitz, 1886; Ceroglossus chloridus Géhin, 1885; Ceroglossus hopei Kraatz-Koschlau, 1885; Carabus elegantissimus Reed, 1874; Ceroglossus dorsiger Motschulsky, 1866; Carabus insularis Hope, 1838; Ceroglossus cherquencoensis Dorsselaer, 1955; Carabus elegans Faz, 1925; Carabus incertus Faz, 1925; Carabus similis Faz, 1925; Carabus curtus Germain, 1895; Carabus politus Faz, 1925; Ceroglossus inexpectatus Kraatz-Koschlau, 1890; Carabus nepotulus Faz, 1925; Carabus cupreus Faz, 1925; Ceroglossus calvus Géhin, 1885; Ceroglossus tomentosus Kraatz-Koschlau, 1885; Ceroglossus psittacus Gerstaecker, 1858

= Ceroglossus buqueti =

Species of beetle

Ceroglossus buqueti is a beetle of the family Carabidae.

== Description ==
Ceroglossus buqueti reaches about 25–32 millimetres (0.98–1.26 in) in length. This species presents marked chromatic polymorphism and morphological variations in shape and in size depending on subspecies and populations. These beetles have a diurnal habit and are predators on small organisms.

== Distribution ==
This species is endemic to the evergreen forests of Chile. The subspecies Ceroglossus buqueti argentinensis occurs in Argentina. These ground beetles prefer xeric habitats and are very tolerant of arid environment.

== Subspecies ==
- Ceroglossus buqueti andestus Kraatz-Koschlau, 1887
- Ceroglossus buqueti argentinensis Jiroux, 1996
- Ceroglossus buqueti arieli Jiroux, 1996
- Ceroglossus buqueti arriagadai Jiroux, 1996
- Ceroglossus buqueti breuningi Heinz & Jiroux, 2001
- Ceroglossus buqueti buqueti Laporte de Castelnau, 1834
- Ceroglossus buqueti cecilae Jiroux, 2006
- Ceroglossus buqueti chiloensis Hope, 1837
- Ceroglossus buqueti cordicollis Rataj & Jaffrezoc, 2009
- Ceroglossus buqueti deuvei Jiroux, 1996
- Ceroglossus buqueti leopardalinus Rataj & Godeau, 2010
- Ceroglossus buqueti lepidus Kraatz-Koschlau, 1891
- Ceroglossus buqueti lorenzi Jiroux, 1998
- Ceroglossus buqueti magdalenaensis Jiroux, 1996
- Ceroglossus buqueti peladosus Kraatz-Koschlau, 1887
- Ceroglossus buqueti quinchilcaensis Rataj & Jaffrezoc, 2009
- Ceroglossus buqueti snizeki Jiroux, 2006
- Ceroglossus buqueti subnitens Kraatz-Koschlau, 1885
- Ceroglossus buqueti sybarita Gerstaecker, 1858
