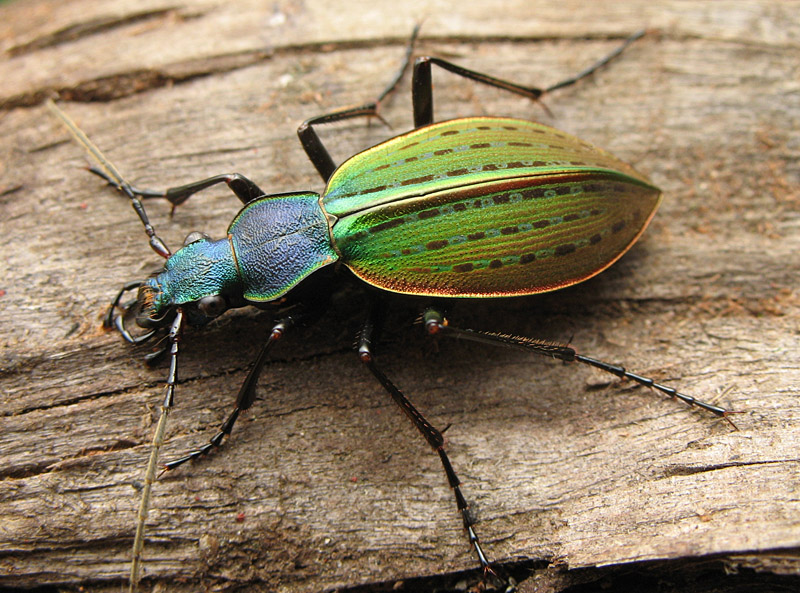
- Ceroglossus ochsenii

Scientific classification
- Domain: Eukaryota
- Kingdom: Animalia
- Phylum: Arthropoda
- Class: Insecta
- Order: Coleoptera
- Suborder: Adephaga
- Family: Carabidae
- Subfamily: Carabinae
- Tribe: Carabini
- Subtribe: Ceroglossina
- Genus: Ceroglossus; Solier, 1848

= Ceroglossus =

Genus of beetles

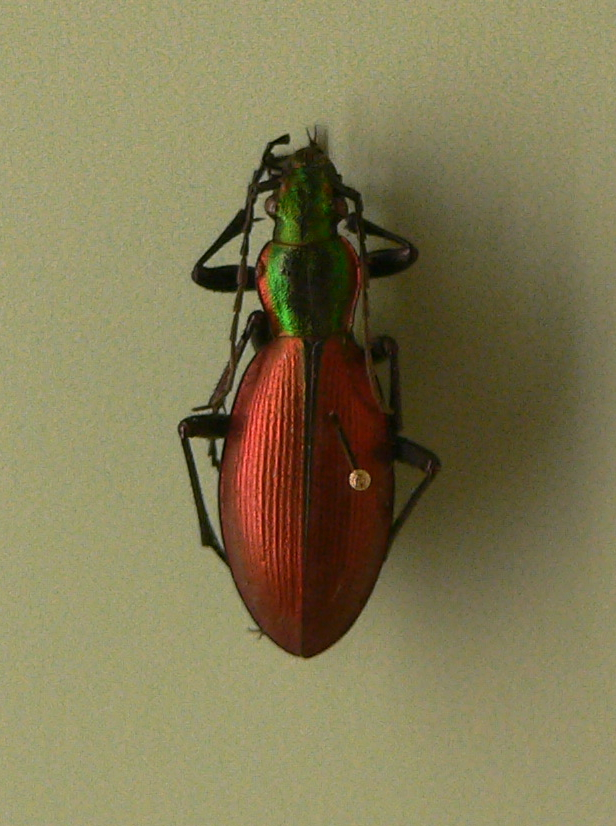
Ceroglossus darwini

Ceroglossus is a genus in the beetle family Carabidae. There are about 10 described species in Ceroglossus, found in South America.

== Species ==
These 10 species belong to the genus Ceroglossus:

- Ceroglossus arcoides Rataj & Godeau, 2010
- Ceroglossus buqueti (Laporte, 1834) (Chile)
- Ceroglossus chilensis (Eschscholtz, 1829) (Chile)
- Ceroglossus darwini (Hope, 1838) (Chile and Argentina)
- Ceroglossus guerini Géhin, 1885 (Chile)
- Ceroglossus magellanicus Géhin, 1885 (Chile)
- Ceroglossus morpheus Rataj, 2011
- Ceroglossus ochsenii (Germain, 1895) (Chile)
- Ceroglossus speciosus Gerstaecker, 1858 (Chile)
- Ceroglossus suturalis (Fabricius, 1775) (Chile)
