= Ceroglossus suturalis =

Scientific classification
- Kingdom: Animalia
- Phylum: Arthropoda
- Class: Insecta
- Order: Coleoptera
- Suborder: Adephaga
- Family: Carabidae
- Genus: Ceroglossus
- Species: C. suturalis

Binomial name
- Ceroglossus suturalis (Fabricius, 1775)

Synonyms
- Carabus suturalis Fabricius, 1775; Ceroglossus chiloensis Kraatz-Koschlau, 1885; Ceroglossus speciosissimus Lapouge, 1928; Ceroglossus suturelevatus Kraatz-Koschlau, 1888; Carabus australis Faz, 1925; Carabus dubitabilis Faz, 1925; Carabus magallanicus Faz, 1925; Carabus reichei Guérin-Méneville, 1840

Species of beetle

Ceroglossus suturalis is a species of beetle in the family Carabidae. This species is found in Chile. Five subspecies are currently recognized.

== Subspecies ==
- Ceroglossus suturalis suturalis
- Ceroglossus suturalis ancudanus A.Morawitz, 1886
- Ceroglossus suturalis hernani Jiroux & Leplat, 2006
- Ceroglossus suturalis olivaceus Kraatz-Koschlau, 1886
- Ceroglossus suturalis puxel Jiroux, 1996
