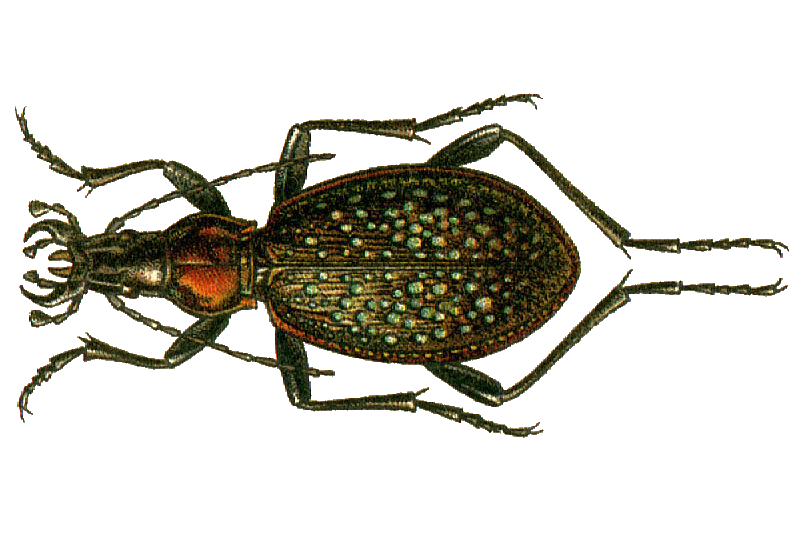
- Carabus lopatini

Scientific classification
- Kingdom: Animalia
- Phylum: Arthropoda
- Class: Insecta
- Order: Coleoptera
- Suborder: Adephaga
- Family: Carabidae
- Subfamily: Carabinae
- Tribe: Carabini
- Subtribe: Carabina; Latreille, 1802

Type genus
- Carabus Linnaeus, 1758

= Carabina =

Subtribe of beetles

Carabina is a subtribe of carab beetles, in the tribe Carabini.
