= Ceroglossus magellanicus =

Scientific classification
- Domain: Eukaryota
- Kingdom: Animalia
- Phylum: Arthropoda
- Class: Insecta
- Order: Coleoptera
- Suborder: Adephaga
- Family: Carabidae
- Genus: Ceroglossus
- Species: C. magellanicus

Binomial name
- Ceroglossus magellanicus Gehin, 1885

Synonyms
- Ceroglossus morawitzi Kraatz, 1887; Ceroglossus bicostulatus Kraatz-Koschlau, 1885; Ceroglossus imitator Jiroux, 1996; Carabus caputolivae Faz, 1925; Carabus imitator Faz, 1925; Carabus magnus Faz, 1925; Carabus vicinus Faz, 1925; Ceroglossus tenebriculus Kraatz-Koschlau, 1887; Carabus aerosus Faz, 1925; Carabus fusco Faz, 1925; Carabus proximus Faz, 1925; Carabus aestectus Faz, 1925; Carabus galbinus Faz, 1925; Carabus izquierdoi Faz, 1925

Species of beetle

Ceroglossus magellanicus is a species of beetle in the family Carabidae. Eighteen subspecies are currently recognized. This species is found in Chile.

== Subspecies ==
- Ceroglossus magellanicus araucanus Kraatz-Koschlau, 1886
- Ceroglossus magellanicus boeufi Jiroux, 1996
- Ceroglossus magellanicus bouchardi Jiroux, 1996
- Ceroglossus magellanicus caburgansis Deuve, 1989
- Ceroglossus magellanicus candens Géhin, 1885
- Ceroglossus magellanicus davidsoni Jiroux, 1998
- Ceroglossus magellanicus dolhemi Jiroux, 1996
- Ceroglossus magellanicus gerstaeckeri A.Morawitz, 1886
- Ceroglossus magellanicus leplati Jiroux, 2006
- Ceroglossus magellanicus lucifer Rataj & Godeau, 2010
- Ceroglossus magellanicus luispenai Jiroux, 2006
- Ceroglossus magellanicus magellanicus Géhin, 1885
- Ceroglossus magellanicus newtoni Jiroux, 1999
- Ceroglossus magellanicus ortrudheinzae Heinz & Jiroux, 2001
- Ceroglossus magellanicus prevosti Jiroux & Heinz, 2010
- Ceroglossus magellanicus roseus Jiroux & Rataj, 2006
- Ceroglossus magellanicus similis Kraatz-Koschlau, 1885
- Ceroglossus magellanicus vidali B.Moore, 2006
