= Ceroglossus guerini =

Scientific classification
- Domain: Eukaryota
- Kingdom: Animalia
- Phylum: Arthropoda
- Class: Insecta
- Order: Coleoptera
- Suborder: Adephaga
- Family: Carabidae
- Genus: Ceroglossus
- Species: C. guerini

Binomial name
- Ceroglossus guerini Géhin, 1885

Synonyms
- Ceroglossus explanatus Beheim & Breuning, 1943; Ceroglossus intermedius Beheim & Breuning, 1943

Species of beetle

Ceroglossus guerini, Guerin's magnificent beetle, is a species of beetle of the Carabidae family. This species is found in Chile, where it inhabits thickets and coppice of Nothofagus, Gevuina and Persea species.

Adults are brachypterous.
