= Ceroglossus speciosus =

Scientific classification
- Domain: Eukaryota
- Kingdom: Animalia
- Phylum: Arthropoda
- Class: Insecta
- Order: Coleoptera
- Suborder: Adephaga
- Family: Carabidae
- Genus: Ceroglossus
- Species: C. speciosus

Binomial name
- Ceroglossus speciosus Gerstaecker, 1858

Synonyms
- Ceroglossus oyarzuni (Faz, 1925); Carabus oyarzuni Faz, 1925

Species of beetle

Ceroglossus speciosus, the showy magnificent beetle, is a species of beetle in the family Carabidae. It is found in Chile, where it inhabits forested slopes and hills.

Adults are brachypterous.
