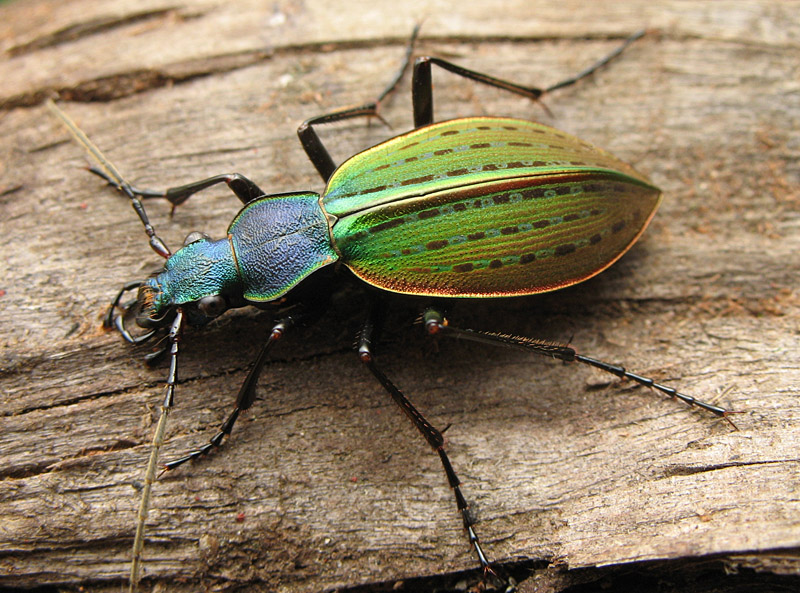

Scientific classification
- Kingdom: Animalia
- Phylum: Arthropoda
- Class: Insecta
- Order: Coleoptera
- Suborder: Adephaga
- Family: Carabidae
- Genus: Ceroglossus
- Species: C. ochsenii

Binomial name
- Ceroglossus ochsenii (Germain, 1895)

Synonyms
- Carabus ochsenii Germain, 1895; Ceroglossus pantherinus Deuve, 1989

= Ceroglossus ochsenii =

Species of beetle

Ceroglossus ochsenii, Ochsen's magnificent beetle, is a species of beetle of the Carabidae family. This species is found in Chile, where it inhabits evergreen forest in lowland areas, 195 meters altitude.

Adults are brachypterous.
