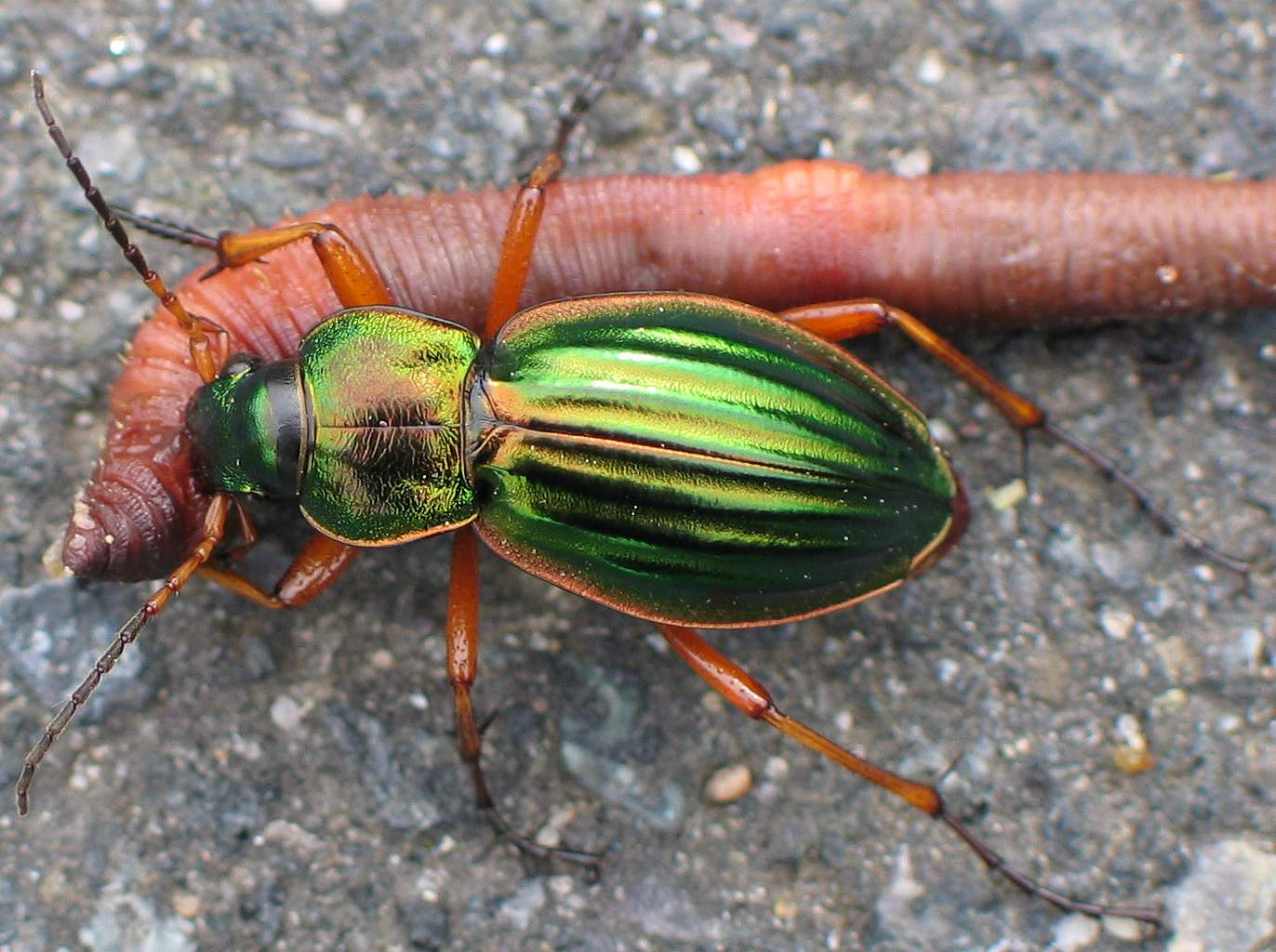
- Carabus auratus with prey in Northern Germany

Scientific classification
- Kingdom: Animalia
- Phylum: Arthropoda
- Class: Insecta
- Order: Coleoptera
- Suborder: Adephaga
- Family: Carabidae
- Subfamily: Carabinae
- Tribe: Carabini; Latreille, 1802

Subtribes
- Carabina Linnaeus, 1802; Ceroglossina Lapouge, 1927

= Carabini =

Tribe of beetles

Carabini is a tribe of ground beetles in the subfamily Carabinae. There are 4 genera and more than 1,100 described species in Carabini.

== Genera ==
These four genera belong to the tribe Carabini:

- Subtribe Carabina Linnaeus, 1802
  - Aplothorax G.R.Waterhouse, 1842 (1 species)
  - Calosoma Weber, 1801 (about 164 species)
  - Carabus Linnaeus, 1758 (about 959 species)
- Subtribe Ceroglossina Lapouge, 1927
  - Ceroglossus Solier, 1848 (10 species)
