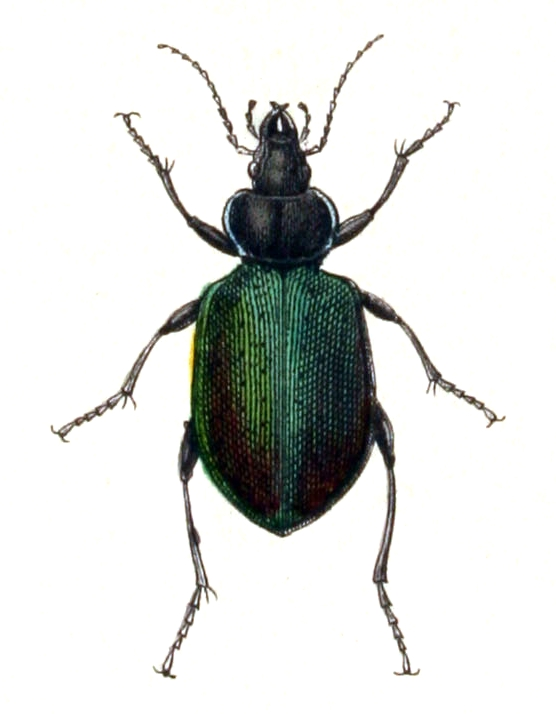
- Calosoma sycophanta

Scientific classification
- Kingdom: Animalia
- Phylum: Arthropoda
- Clade: Pancrustacea
- Class: Insecta
- Order: Coleoptera
- Suborder: Adephaga
- Family: Carabidae
- Tribe: Carabini
- Genus: Calosoma; Weber, 1801

Subgenera
- Blaptosoma Gehin, 1876 Callisphaena Motschulsky, 1859 Callistenia Lapouge, 1929 Callisthenes Fischer von Waldheim, 1820 Callitropa Motschulsky, 1866 Calopachys Haury, 1880 Calosoma Weber, 1801 Caminara Motschulsky, 1866 Campalita Motschulsky, 1866 Carabomimus Kolbe, 1895 Carabomorphus Kolbe, 1895 Carabophanus Kolbe, 1895 Carabops Jakobson, 1900 Carabosoma Géhin, 1885 Castrida Motschulsky, 1866 Charmosta Motschulsky, 1866 Chrysostigma Kirby, 1837 Ctenosta Motschulsky, 1866 Elgonorites Jeannel, 1940 Microcallisthenes Apfelbeck, 1918 Neocalosoma Breuning, 1927 Orinodromus Kolbe, 1895 Teratexis Semenov & Znojko, 1933

Synonyms
- List: Callisoma Agassiz, 1846 (Unj. Emend.); Calamata Motschulsky, 1865; Callistriga Motschulsky, 1865; Callipara Motschulsky, 1866; Callistrata Motschulsky, 1866; Camedula Motschulsky, 1866; Calodrepa Motschulsky, 1866; Campolyta Motschulsky, 1866; Cosmoplata Motschulsky, 1866; Eutelodontum Gehin, 1881; Aulacopterum Gehin, 1885; Tapinosthenes Kolbe, 1895; Calister Reitter, 1896; Acamegonia Lapouge, 1924; Camegonia Lapouge, 1924; Isostenia Lapouge, 1929; Microcalosoma Breuning, 1927; Paracalosoma Breuning, 1927; Syncalosoma Breuning, 1927; Acampalita Lapouge, 1929; Australodrepa Lapouge, 1929; Catasoma Lapouge, 1929; Catastriga Lapouge, 1929; Eremosoma Lapouge, 1929; Lyperostenia Lapouge, 1929; Paratropa Lapouge, 1929; Acalosoma Lafer, 1989/1990

= Calosoma =

Genus of beetles

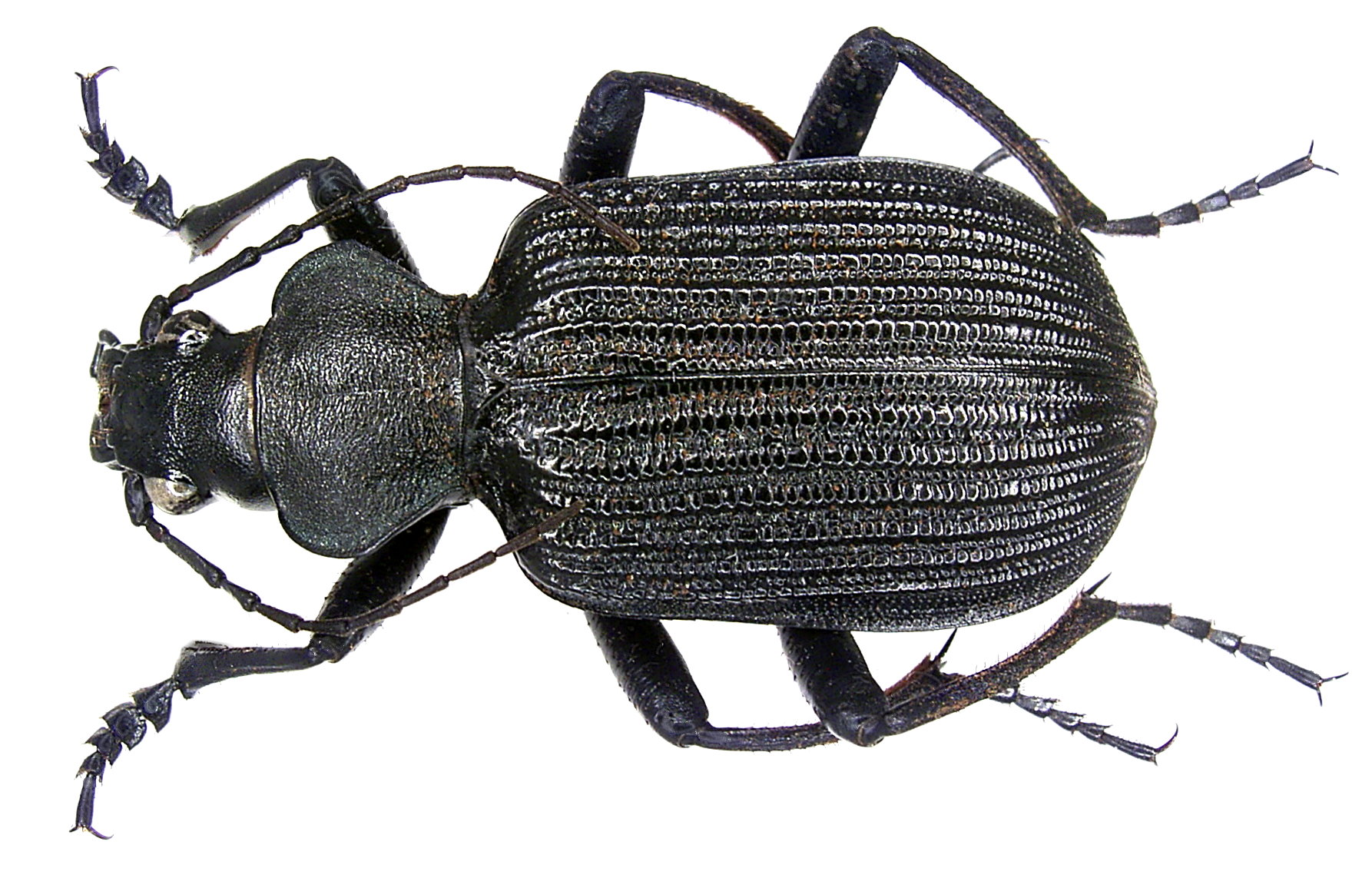
Calosoma planicolle

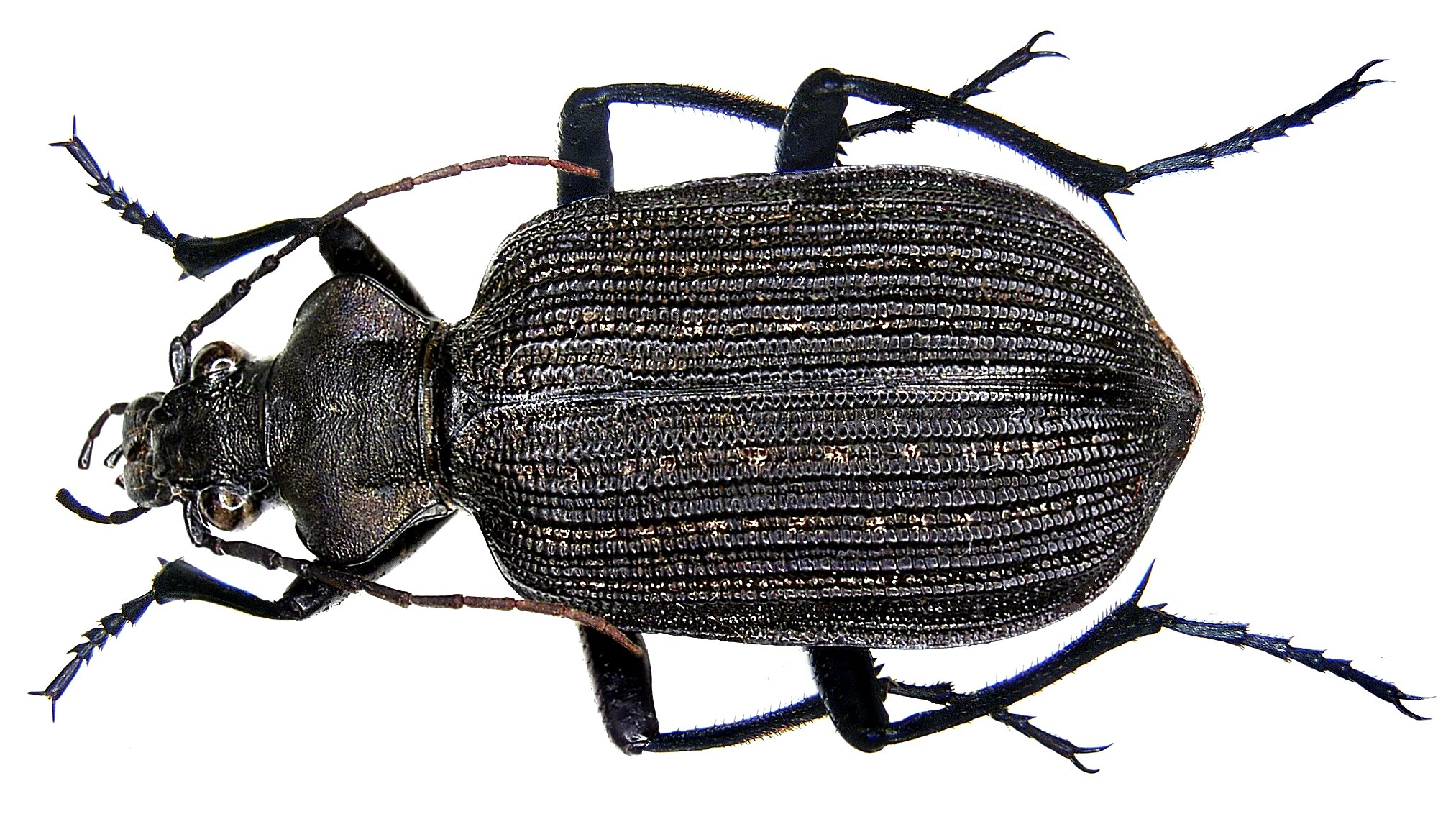
Calosoma senegalense

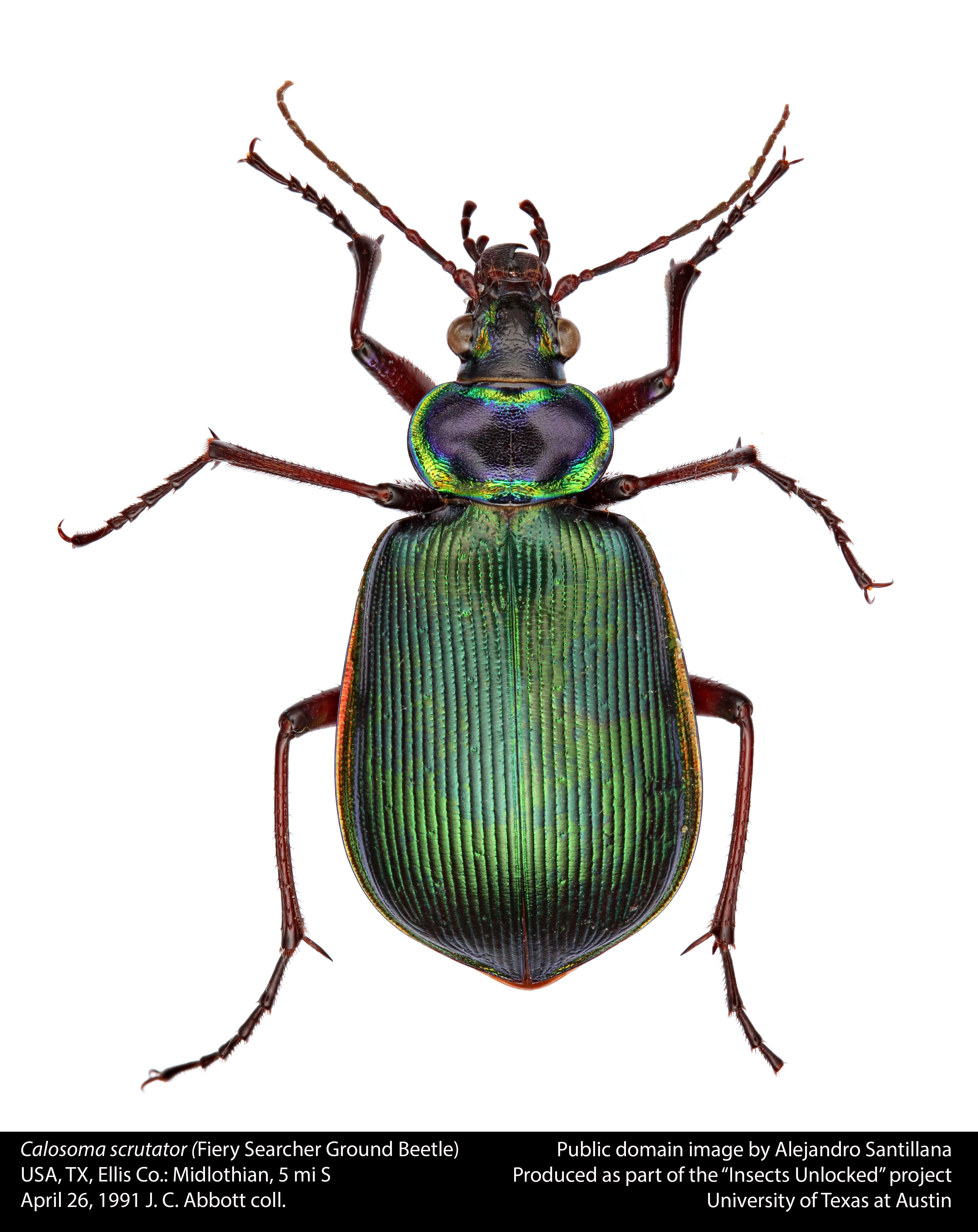
Calosoma scrutator by Alejandro Santillana "Insects Unlocked" Project, University of Texas at Austin

Calosoma is a genus of large ground beetles that occur primarily throughout the Northern Hemisphere, and are referred to as caterpillar hunters or caterpillar searchers. Many of the 167 species are largely or entirely black, but some have bright metallic coloration. They produce a foul-smelling spray from glands near the tip of the abdomen. They are recognizable due to their large thorax, which is almost the width of their abdomen and much wider than their head.

Calosoma has about 20 subgenera, including some former genera such as Callisthenes.

== History ==
In 1905, Calosoma sycophanta was imported to New England for control of the spongy moth. The species is a voracious consumer of caterpillars during both its larval stage and as an adult, as are other species in the genus. For this reason, they are generally considered beneficial insects. Several species of this beetle, most notably the black calosoma (Calosoma semilaeve) are especially common in the California area.

== See also ==
- List of Calosoma species
