= Olmany swamps =

Wetland area in Belarus

Olmany swamps Альманскія балоты Ольманские болота
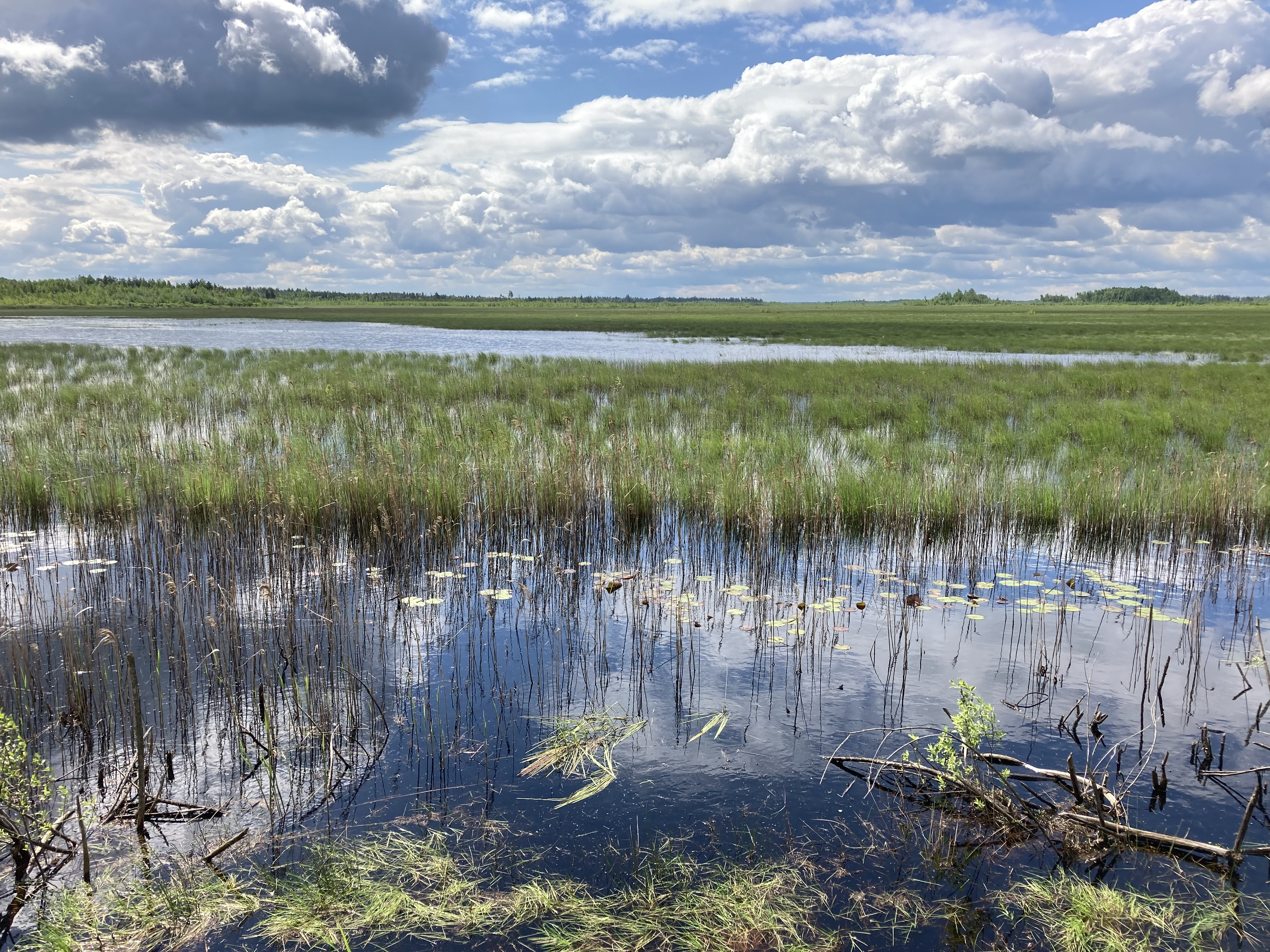

- Location within Belarus
- Location: Brest Voblast, Belarus
- Coordinates: 51°47′N 27°21′E
- Area: 94,219 hectares (232,820 acres)

Ramsar Wetland
- Official name: Olmany Mires Zakaznik
- Designated: 10 August 2001
- Reference no.: 1091

Olmany swamps or Аĺmanskija swamps (Альманскія балоты; Ольманские болота; Olmany swamps reserve or Olmany Mires Zakaznik (Ландшафтны заказнік Альманскія балоты; Ландшафтный заказник Ольманские болота) is a protected area in the Brest Voblast of Belarus. It is one of many important swamps of Belarus and one of the largest natural complexes of bogs in Europe.

On the territory of Belarus, most of the Olmany swamps area are under protection for wetland conservation. On the Ukrainian side of the border they are partially protected as part of the Rówieński nature reserve.

Named after the Almany (village).

== History ==
Numerous swamps and peat bogs that once existed in Polesie were drained in the 20th century, mainly in the Soviet times.

In the 1920s and 1930s, Władysław Szafer proposed creating a nature reserve in the area of Olmany swamps, then located in Poland. At the end of the 1930s, Stanisław Kulczyński provided the scientific foundations for the creation of this reserve, but the outbreak of World War II thwarted these plans.

At the end of the 1950s, the Soviet botanist Nikolai Smolski returned to the idea of protecting the Polesie marsh landscapes. The swaps were not covered by the military base, which was located there, but thanks to the training ground, they avoided draining. In 1998 they were placed under protection as a landscape reserve of national importance. In 2001 it was included in the list of the Ramsar Convention.

== Surface ==
Olmany swamps is one of the largest swamp complex of low, raised and transitional peat bogs, which has survived to the present day in its natural state in Europe. The Olmany Swamps Landscape Reserve covers an area of 936.99 km^{2}. 50% of its area is forests, 40% open swamps and peat bogs, 5% rivers and their shores, and 5% other areas. Up to 1% of the reserve's area is covered by agricultural areas. Between the marshes and peat bogs there are numerous dunes covered with forest.

== Hydrology ==
Swamps are located in between the Lwy (Mostwy) and Stwiha rivers. There are 25 lakes in the reserve. The largest of them are lake Zasumińskie Balshoe and lake Zasumińskie Malae with a total area of 100 ha. The remaining lakes do not exceed the area of 5 ha. The hydrological conditions are stable.

In part of the reserve, there is an old drainage network from the beginning of the 20th century. The canals, however, are completely or partially destroyed, so they do not significantly affect the water management.

== Fauna ==
Swamps are inhabited by 151 species of birds, 25 of which are listed in the Red Book of Belarus. Among them there are: greater spotted eagle, black-tailed godwit, curlew, common crane, great owl and western capercaillie.

Mammals are represented by 26 species, including 3 included to the Red Book of Belarus. They include, among others, European mink, European otter, Eurasian lynx, European badger and Hazel dormouse.

The reptiles include, among others European pond turtle and smooth snake.

There are multiple insect species there, among others are Carabus cancellatus, Carabus violaceus, Carabus coriaceus, Calosoma inquisitor, Colias palaeno, Oeneis jutta and Bombus muscorum.

== Flora ==
There are 687 plant species found in the reserve, 12 of which are listed in the Red Book of Belarus. There are, among others Carex umbrosa, Corydalis intermedia, Drosera intermedia, Lycopodiella inundata, Nymphaea alba, Pulsatilla pratensis, Salix myrtilloides, Iris sibirica, Salvia pratensis, Lilium martagon, Salvinia natans, Viola uliginosa.

== Human activity ==
In the area of Landscape Reserve there is a military airport and a military training ground. Hunting, fishing and picking mushrooms and berries are allowed. There is also a regulated forest management (an average of 35,000 m3 of wood is harvested annually).

In 2016, a road construction project was approved through the reserve. It was protested by ecologists who believed that the dike would change the hydrological conditions of the marshes. According to scientists and the authorities, the road will allow a faster response to peat fires that plague the reserve. Another road was established in 2018.

In 2018, illegal peat mines were discovered in the reserve.

== Threats ==
Peat fires are considered to be the main threat to the swamps. Other threats include the unlimited harvesting of cranberries, which reduces the food base for some animals, grazing livestock and poaching.

== Gallery ==
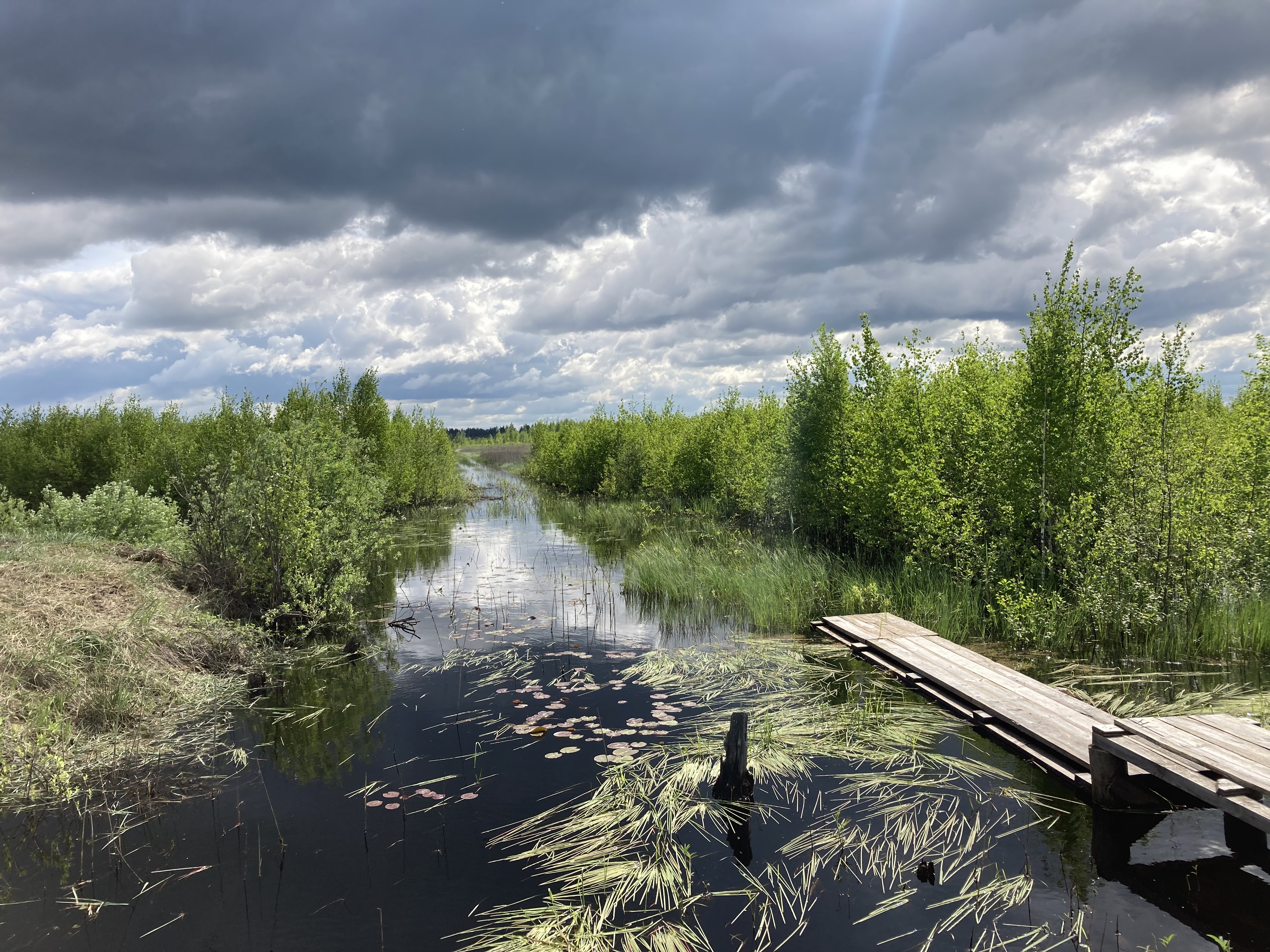

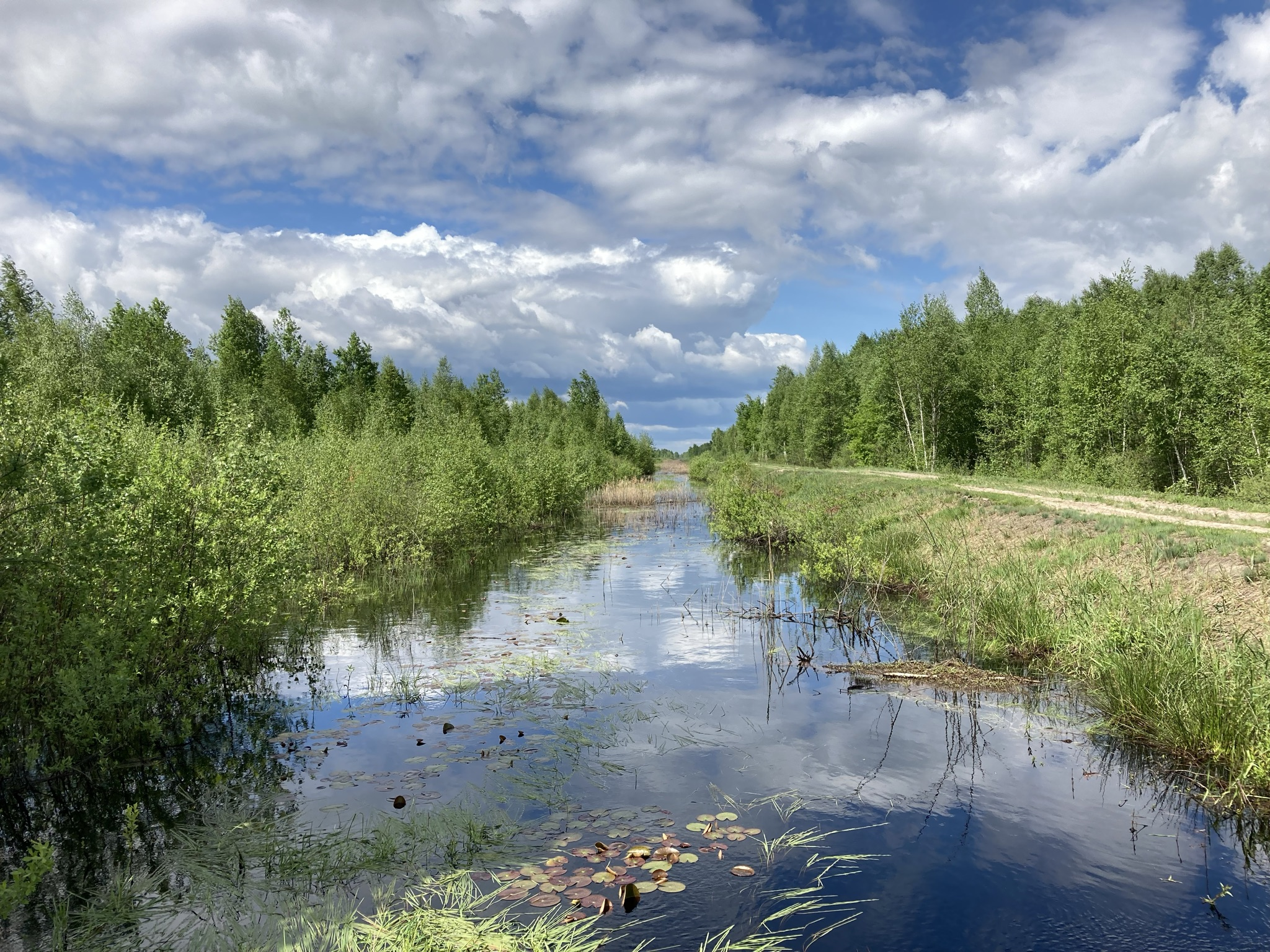

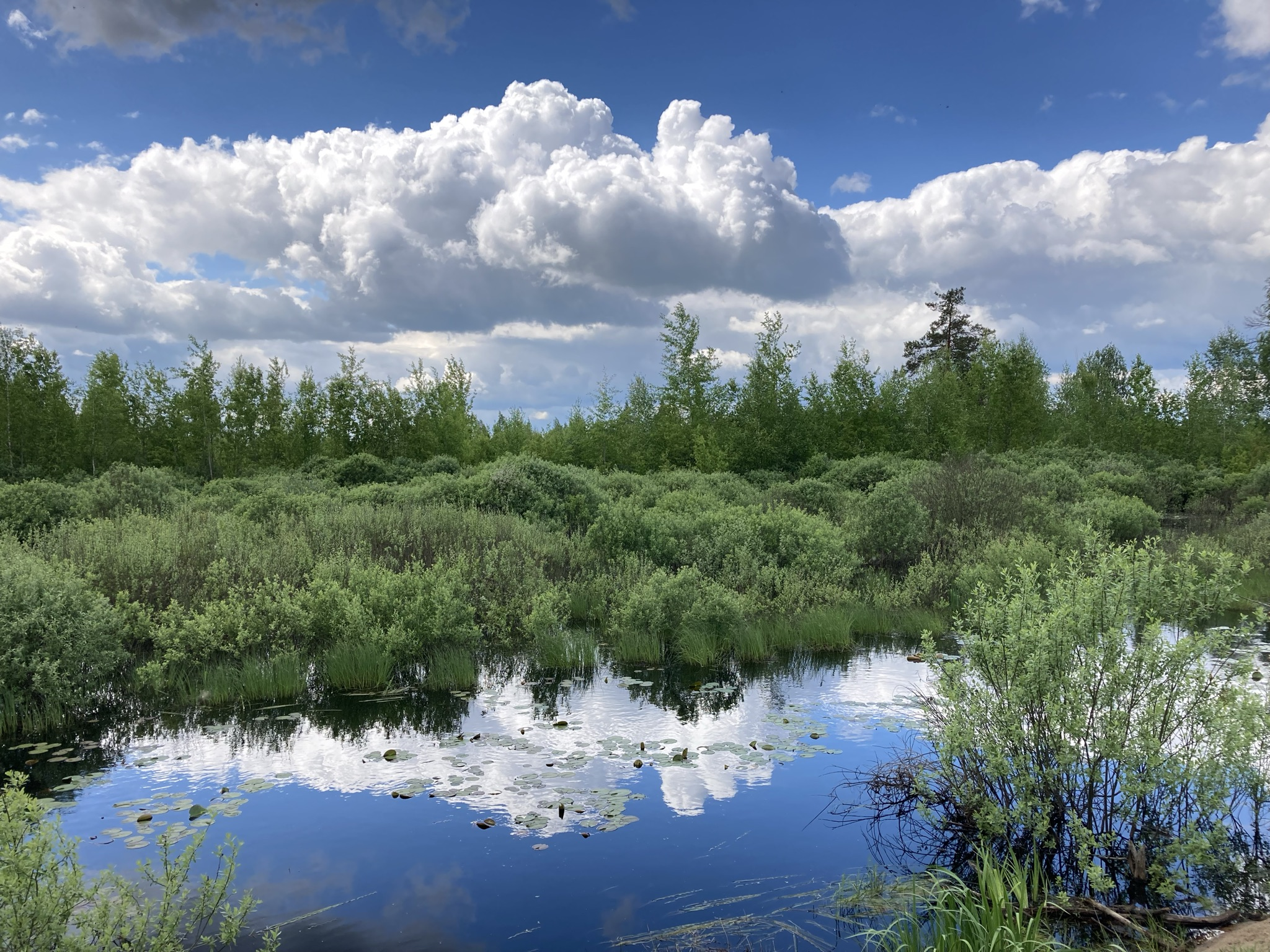

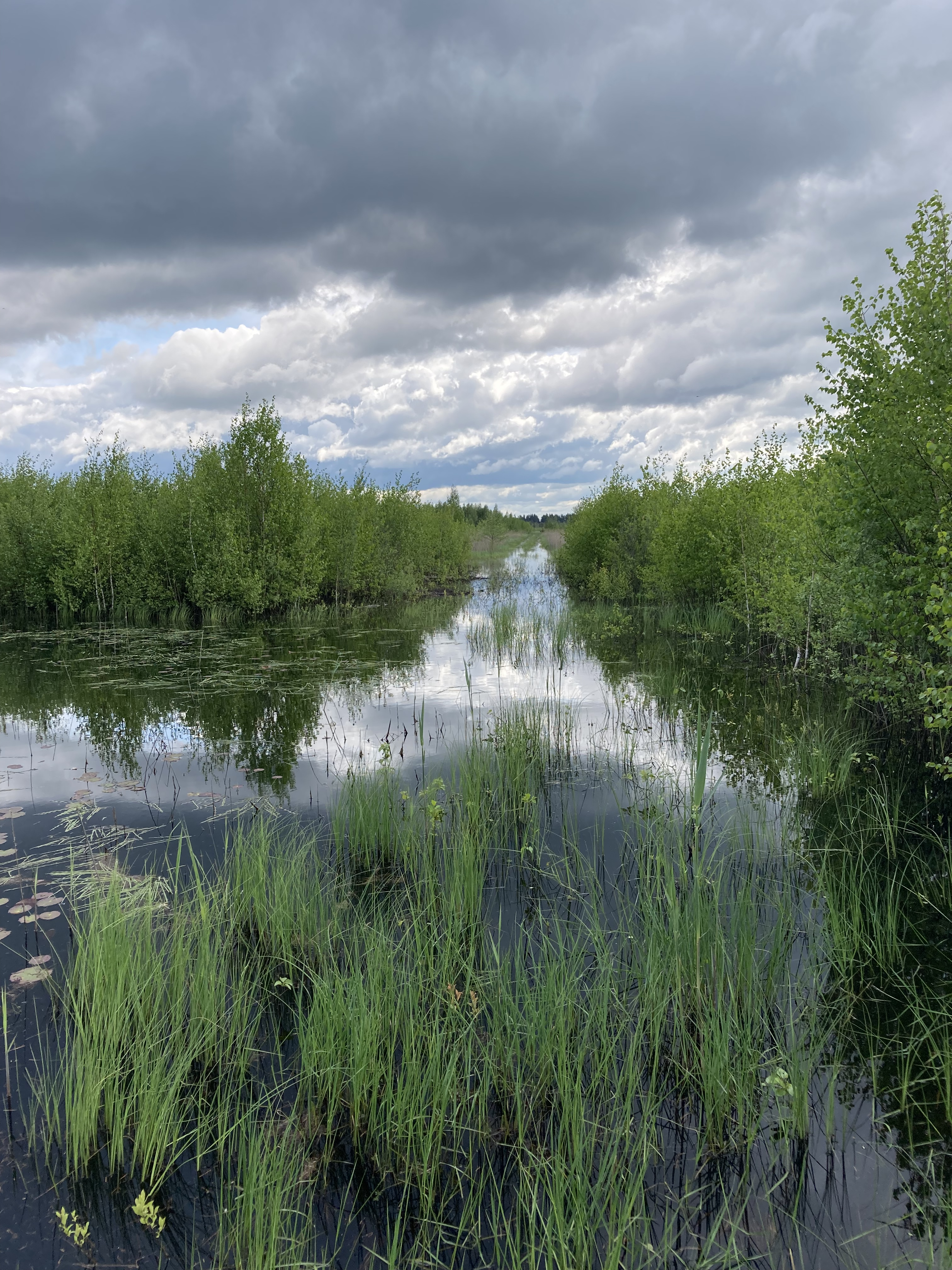

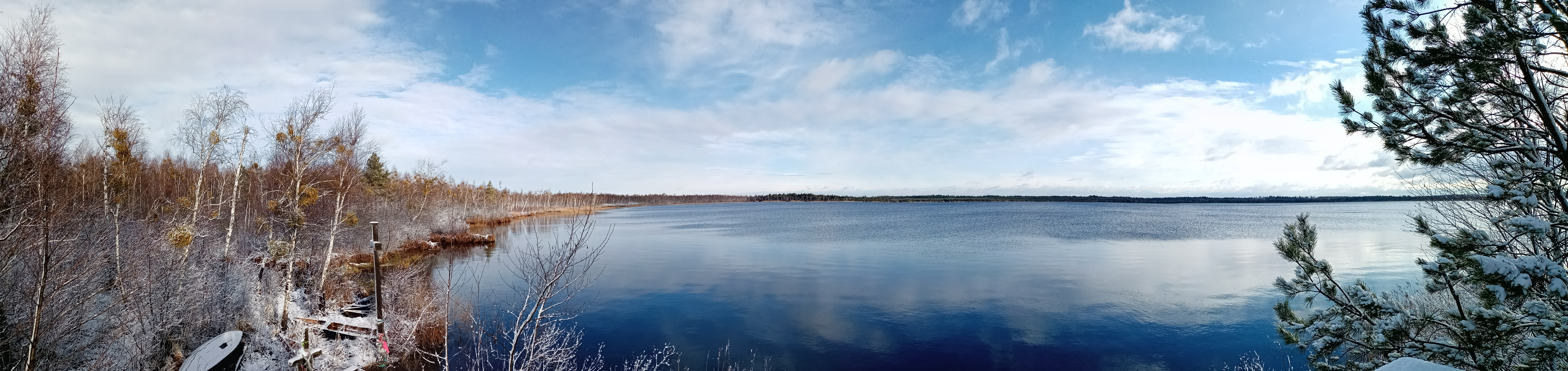
