= Balota =

Balota may refer to:

- Several villages in Romania:
  - Balota, a village in Prunișor Commune, Mehedinți County
  - Balota, a village in Racovița Commune, Vâlcea County
  - Balota de Jos and Balota de Sus, villages in Murgași Commune, Dolj County
- The Balota, a river in southern Romania, tributary of the Luncavăț
- Balota village in the Taluka of Hansot, Gujarat, India
- "Balota" means swamp in Belarusian, see Swamps of Belarus

== People ==
- Mate Balota (1898-1963), Croatian poet

== Film ==
- Balota, a 2024 Philippine political thriller satire drama film
