= Yelnya =

Yelnya (Russian: Ельня) is the name of several inhabited localities in Russia.

Urban localities

- Yelnya, Yelninsky District, Smolensk Oblast, a town in Yelninsky District of Smolensk Oblast; administratively incorporated as Yelninskoye Urban Settlement

Rural localities

- Yelnya, Bryansk Oblast, a village in Krasnovichsky Selsoviet of Unechsky District of Bryansk Oblast
- Yelnya, Mozhaysky District, Moscow Oblast, a village in Borisovskoye Rural Settlement of Mozhaysky District of Moscow Oblast
- Yelnya, Noginsky District, Moscow Oblast, a village in Akseno-Butyrskoye Rural Settlement of Noginsky District of Moscow Oblast
- Yelnya, Gagarinsky District, Smolensk Oblast, a village in Yelninskoye Rural Settlement of Gagarinsky District of Smolensk Oblast
- Yelnya, Rudnyansky District, Smolensk Oblast, a village in Smoligovskoye Rural Settlement of Rudnyansky District of Smolensk Oblast

== See also ==
- Yelnya Reserve in Belarus
