= Swamps of Belarus =

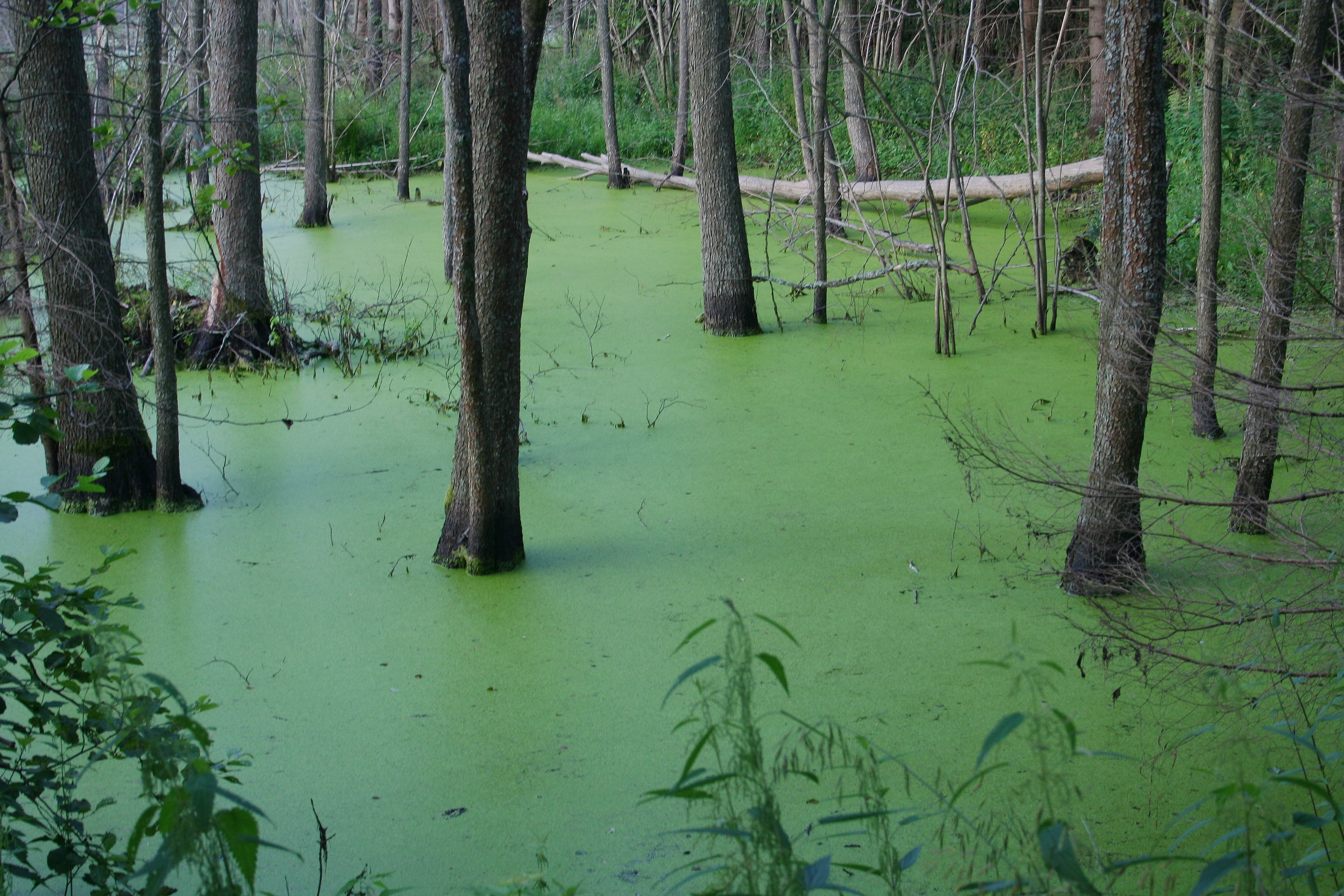
Swamp in Białowieża Forest, on the Belarus–Poland border

Swamps, marshes, mires, bogs, and fens are important parts of the natural landscape in Belarus. Vast swamplands historically covered the country, and currently there are around 2.5 million hectares of wetlands in Belarus. Notable swamp regions are Pinsk Marshes and Olmany swamps in Polesia and Yelnya Swamp in Vitebsk region.

== Names ==
Swamps, marshes, mires, bogs, and fens are all usually called "Балота" (balota) in Belarusian, though there are many synonyms: Багна, Дрыгва, Гiжня, etc.

== Current situation ==
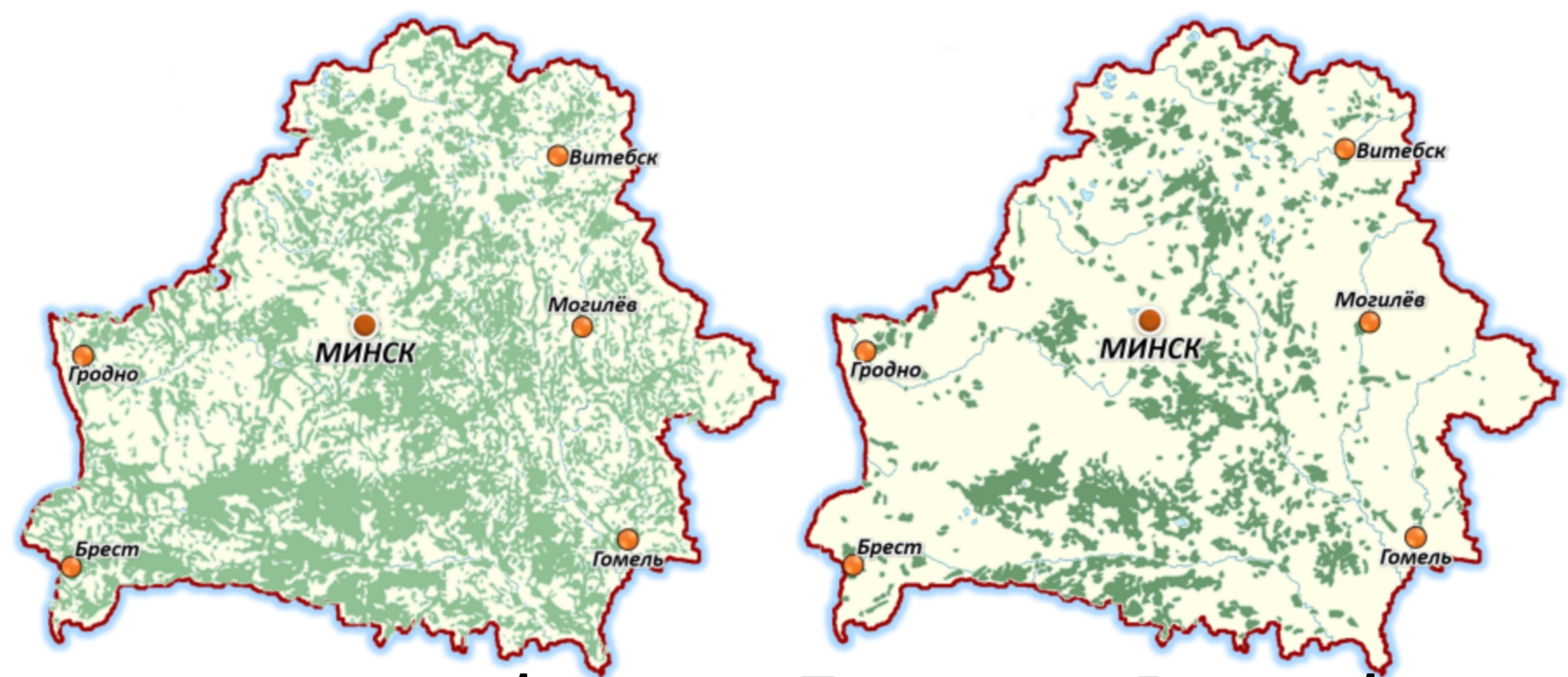
Swamps in Belarus in 1958 and 2000

In the early 20th century, almost 40% of the territory, 8 million hectares, were wetlands. Around 2.56 to 2.94 million hectares were swamps and marshes (more than 12% of Belarus's territory). Today, about 4% of the territory is swamps, or 863 thousand hectares. Over half of Belarus's swamps were drained for agricultural and forestry purposes between the 1960s and 1970s, leading to loss of biodiversity, increased droughts and frosts, and depleted groundwater levels in some areas. Efforts to revive and rehydrate drained peatlands in order to restore their ecological functions began in the 2010s.

There are 9,192 swamps in Belarus. Low type peat deposit area is 81.6% (2,103.800 ha), transitional area is 3.4% (106.200 ha), and high one is 15.0% (333.700 ha). Yelnya Swamp, one of the oldest swamps, was formed about 13,000 years ago.

== History of wetland irrigation ==
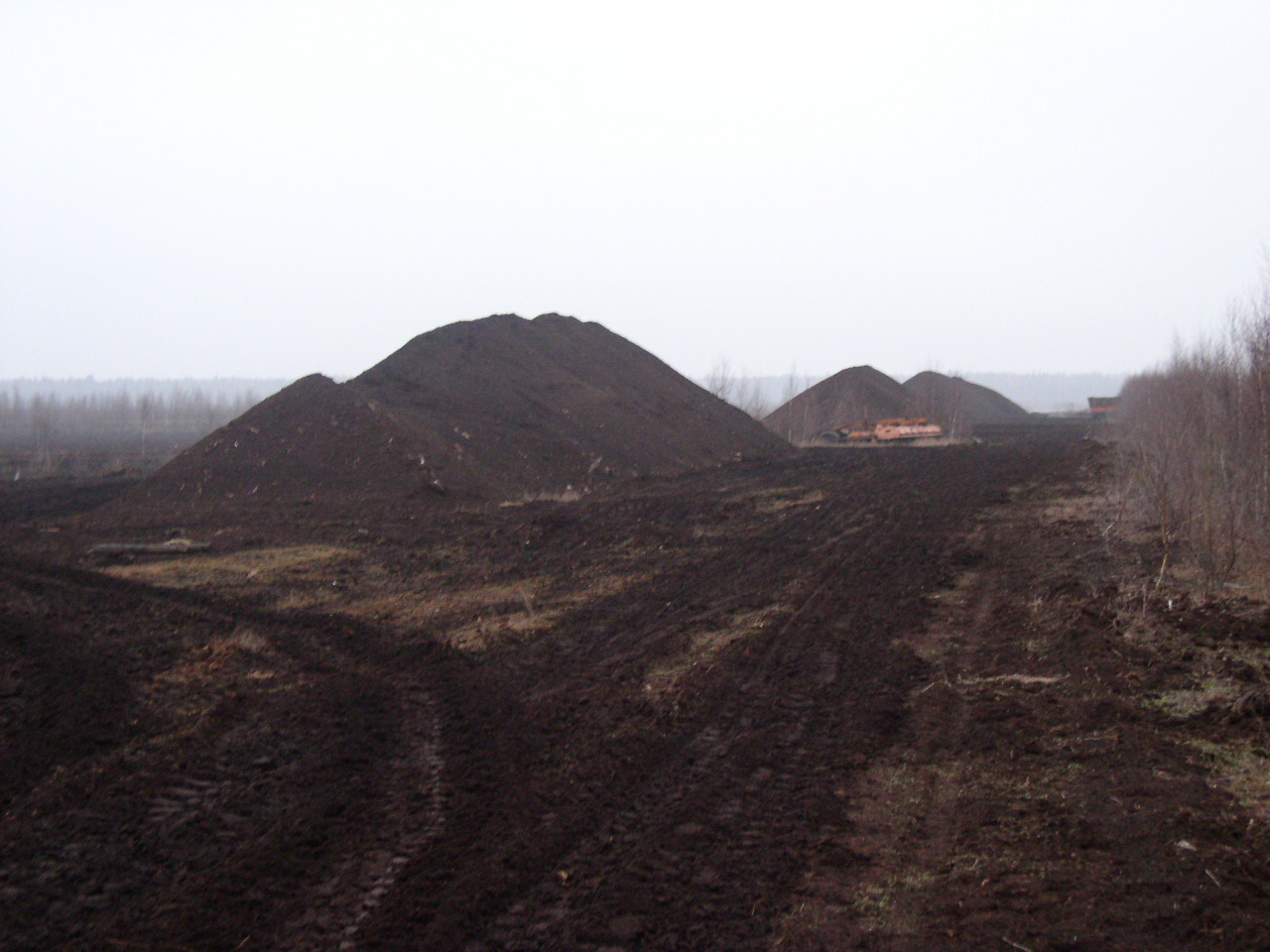
Peat mining near Rudzensk

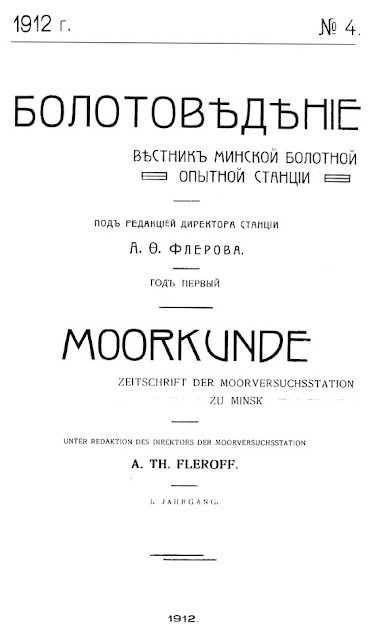
Bolotovedenie ("Swamp science"), a journal issued by the Minsk Experimental Swamp Station since 1912

The land improvement by irrigation of wetlands in Belarus has a long history, going back to the Western Swamp Drainage Reclamation Expedition (1872–1902) (Russian: Западная экспедиция по осушению болот) under the direction of General Iosif Zhilinsky. This massive project constructed thousands of kilometers of drainage canals throughout Polesia, converting swamps into meadows, arable land, and timber transport waterways. While innovative for its time, it disrupted the natural hydrology of the region. Around 410,000 hectares of swamps were drained.

In 1911, the Minsk Experimental Swamp Station (Russian: Минская опытная болотная станция) was opened, under its first director botanist Aleksandr Flerov. It started research on the Komarovskoe swamp in Minsk. By the late 1920s, this swamp covering 218 hectares had been completely drained after works began in 1925. In 1930, the station became the All-Union Research Institute of Soil Science and Amelioration, with a goal of systematically studying the wetlands of the Soviet Union.

Belarus has one of the world's largest deposits of peat. Peat has been mined industrially since 1896, and in Soviet times it was the main fuel for power plants.

Large-scale swamp draining efforts were revived in the Soviet era during the 1960s–1970s, with over 60% of Belarus's wetlands being drained, primarily for agriculture and peat mining. Though increasing production in the short term, severe disruption of wetland ecosystems led to soil degradation, groundwater depletion, biodiversity loss, and local climate changes.

Amelioration of the Komarovskoe swamp in Minsk, early 1920s

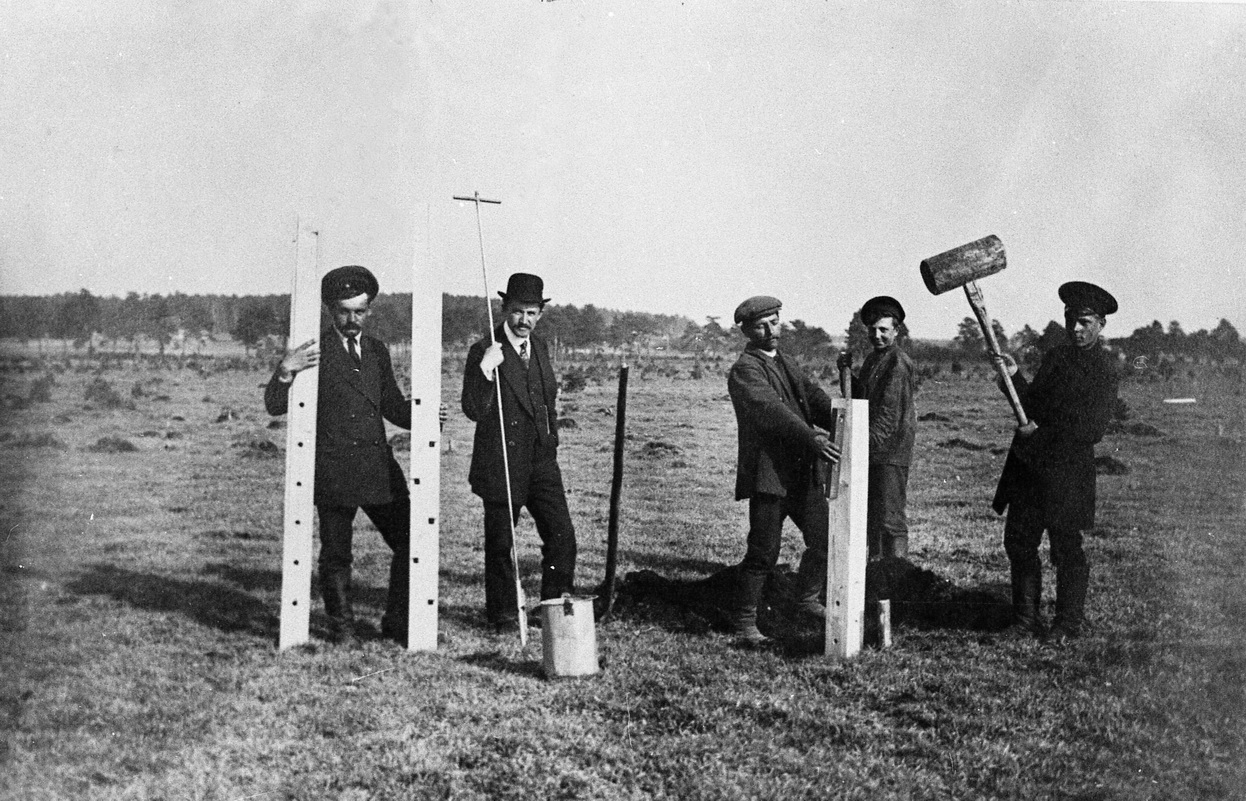

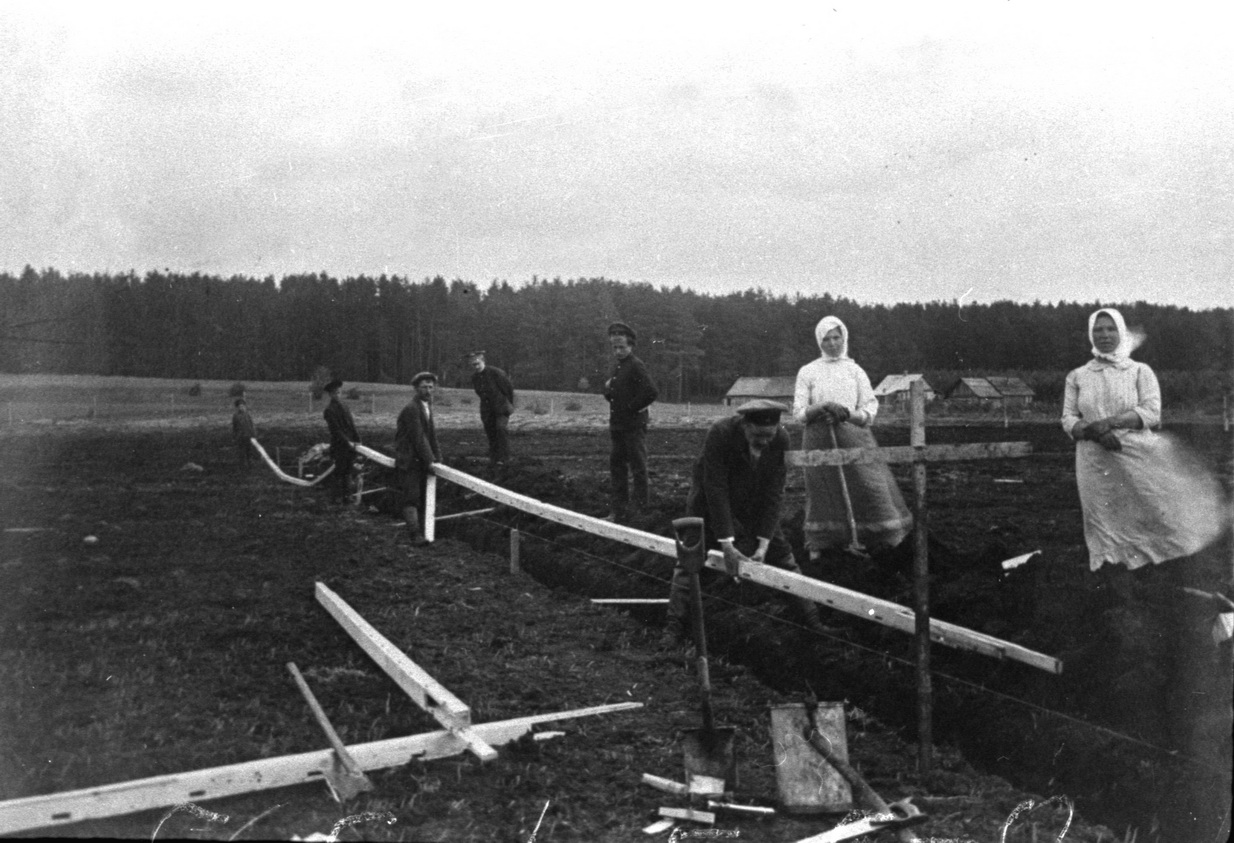

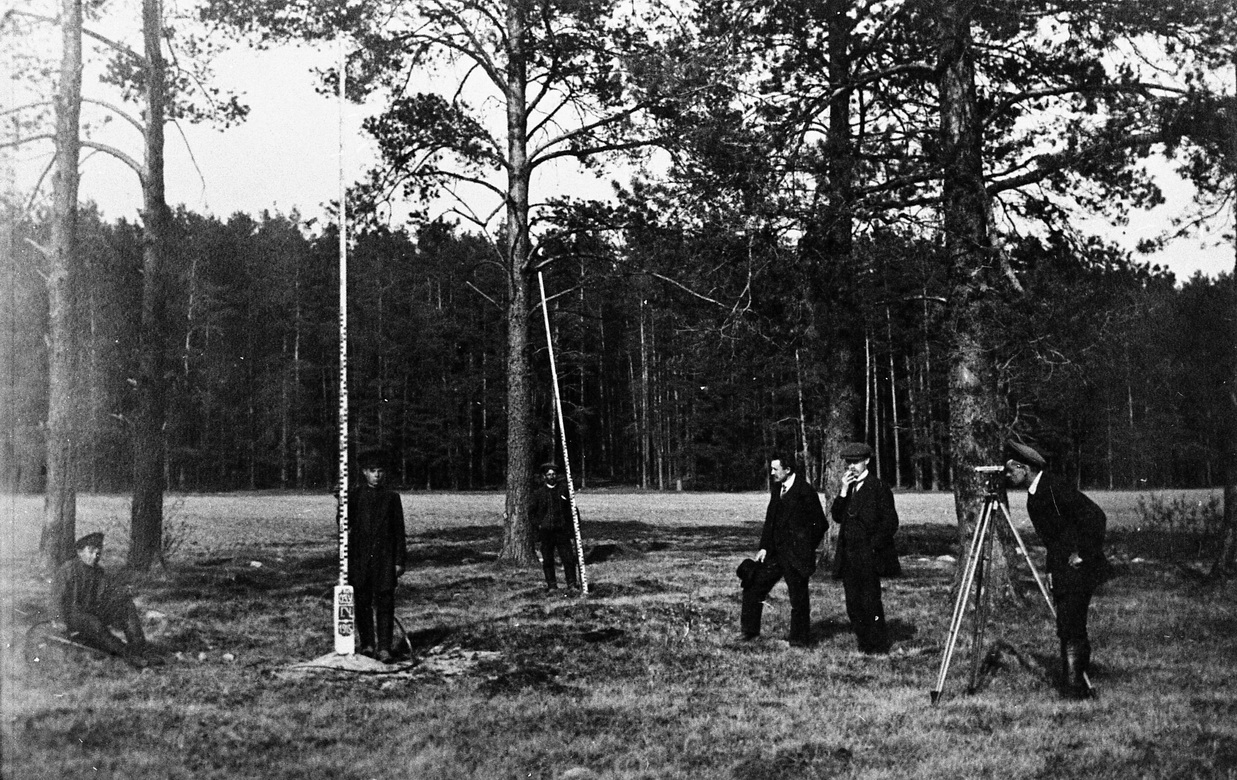

== Reviving the swamps ==
Recognizing the important ecological roles that swamps play, including storing carbon, maintaining hydrological cycles, and providing habitat for flora and fauna, Belarus has made efforts since the 2010s to restore portions of its drained peatlands. This "rewetting" process involves techniques like blocking drainage canals to raise water tables.

International environmental organizations like the UN Development Programme have partnered with the Belarus government to fund and execute restoration projects on over 60,000 hectares of degraded peatlands so far. While still a small fraction of what was lost, these restored swamps aim to revive ecological functions and mitigate impacts like wildfires, greenhouse gas emissions, and biodiversity decline caused by draining.

== Biodiversity ==
Belarus's swamps and wetlands host a diverse array of flora and fauna: 267 species of flowering plants and ferns, including 37 woody species, 167 herbaceous species, and 63 species of mosses. The wetlands provide habitat for over 50 valuable medicinal plants, as well as berry plants like cranberry, lingonberry, and bilberry. Rare and threatened species found here include insectivorous plants, sphagnum mosses, cotton grass, and plants listed in the Belarus Red Book. The wetlands are vital for conserving bird populations, sheltering significant portions of European populations of species like the aquatic warbler, black stork, white stork, lesser spotted eagle, and great snipe. Mammal species like elk, raccoon dog, and wolf also depend on these wetlands. Belarus has designated 20 potential territories of international and national importance, covering 2.9% of the country's area, to safeguard this exceptional biodiversity concentrated in fen complexes, bog complexes, river floodplains, forest–floodplain–lake mosaics, fishery ponds, and forests.

== In culture ==
"Marsh. Polissia", painting by Ivan Shishkin, 1890

Swamps played a big role in Belarusian literature, with many authors writing about "swampy land" or "swampy country", like Yakub Kolas's novella The Morass ("Дрыгва", 1933), Yanka Maur's novella The Robinsons of Palesse ("Палескія рабінзоны", 1930), and Ivan Melezh's novel People on the Marshes ("Людзі на балоце", 1962). Uladzimir Karatkevich's novella King Stakh's Wild Hunt ("Дзікае паляванне Караля Стаха", 1964) is set in a swamp area. Swamps are often seen as a symbol of Belarus; swampy lands were the cheapest and their agricultural output was very poor, so the theme of melioration and developing a better land was popular in Soviet times. Belarusian poets described Polesia as the land of swamps and forests. In Victor Martinovich's 2013 novel, Sphagnum, Belarus is compared to a peat moss, sphagnum.

== List of largest swamps ==
Name	Native names	Photo	Status	Area (ha)	Turf type	Coordinates	Description
Yelnya Swamp	Ельня		Republican landscape reserve, Ramsar site	18,794	Raised bog	55°33′N 27°51′E	One of the largest raised bogs in Belarus with numerous lakes scattered throughout. Located in Vitebsk Oblast, Miory district.
Olmany swamps	Альманскія балоты Ольманские болота		Republican landscape reserve, Ramsar site	Poddybiche - 48,292; Vilya - 4,741	Raised, transitional, fen	51°47′N 27°21′E	The largest complex of raised, transitional and fen bogs in Europe located in Stolin district, Brest region.
Pinsk Marshes (or Pripet Marshes, Polesie Marshe)	Прыпяцкія балоты Припятские болота		National park, Ramsar site	Kandel-Yalovets-Olkhovo - 22,020; Mezhch - 25,326	Transitional	52°09′N 27°00′E	Vast complex of transitional and raised bogs in the extensive floodplain of the Pripyat River in Lelchitsy district, Gomel region.
Yukhvichy Swamp	Юховичское болото		Republican landscape reserve	1,655	Raised bog	56.0435°N 28.6108°E	Raised bog overgrown with pine and birch in Rossony district, Vitebsk region.
Sporava Swamp	Спораўскае балота Споровские болота		Republican biological reserve, Ramsar site	Total: 19,384; Peschanka - 2,224; Berestovets - 2,671; Oborovskoye - 6,597	Fen	52°25′N 25°19′E	Complex of fen floodplain bogs along the Yaselda River in Brest region. Habitat of globally threatened Aquatic Warbler.
Zvanets Swamp	Званец		Republican biological reserve, Ramsar site	10,441	Fen	52°02′N 24°52′E	One of the largest fen bogs in Europe, habitat for the globally threatened Aquatic Warbler in Drogichin district, Brest region.
Mokh Swamp	Мох		Republican hydrological reserve	4,298	Transitional	55.6226°N 27.4466°E	Regulates water levels of surrounding lakes in Miory district, Vitebsk region. Transition mire with open sections.
Kozyansky Swamps	Козьянские болота		Republican landscape reserve, Ramsar site	Obol - 4,900; Yamilshcha - 2,087	Raised bog	55°27′N 29°21′E	Raised bogs with numerous small lakes scattered throughout in Polotsk and Shumilina districts, Vitebsk region.
Domzheritskoye Swamp	Домжерицкое болото		National park, Ramsar site	8,995	Raised bog	54.7241°N 28.3672°E	Large raised bog in Berezinsky Biosphere Reserve, Lepiel district, Vitebsk region. Up to 6 endangered plant species per m2.
Slobodskoye Swamp	Слободское болото		National park, Ramsar site	2,565	Raised bog	54.6955°N 28.6136°E	Raised bog in Berezinsky Biosphere Reserve, Lepiel district, Vitebsk region. High diversity of endangered plant species.
Osveyskoye Swamp	Асвейскае; Освейское		Republican landscape reserve, Ramsar site	3,357	Raised bog	56°04′N 28°09′E	Raised bog adjoining Lake Osveya, the second largest natural lake overgrown with peat in Belarus. In Verhnedvinsk district, Vitebsk region.
Servech Swamp	Болото Сервечь		Republican hydrological reserve, Ramsar site	Servech - 4,542; B. Sitse - 1,607	Raised, fen	54°58′N 27°29′E	Wetland complex including Lake Servech and Servech River floodplain. Northernmost habitat of the Aquatic Warbler in Belarus. In Dokshitsy district, Vitebsk region.
Vygonoshchanskoye Swamp	Выганашчанскае балота Болото Выгонощанское		Republican landscape reserve, Ramsar site	40,207	Fen	52.6935°N 25.8217°E	One of the largest preserved wetlands on the divide between the Black and Baltic Sea basins in Ivatsevichi and Lyakhovichi districts, Brest region.
Marochna Swamp	Марочна; Морочно		Republican wetland reserve, Ramsar site	Marochna - 5,969; Marochna-1 - 1,314	Raised bog	51.8532°N 26.5919°E	Largest raised bog in western Polesie, important cranberry site and water regulator. In Stolin district, Brest region.
Stary Zhaden Swamp	Болото Старый Жаден		Republican wetland reserve, Ramsar site	Smolyarnya - 3,101; Shchashchits - 3,143	Fen, raised bog	51°54′N 27°36′E	Complex of fen and raised bogs in Zhsykavichy and Lelchycy districts, Gomel region. Continued:
Duleba Swamp	Астравы Дулебы; Болото Дулебское		Republican hydrological reserve, Ramsar site	30,772	Raised bog	53°47′N 29°29′E	Raised bogs and old-growth forests, former military site, in Klichaw and Byalynichy districts, Mogilev region.
Zaozerye Swamp	Болото Заозерье		Republican hydrological reserve, Ramsar site	4,965	Raised bog	53.8442°N 29.4557°E	Boreal raised bogs in Byalynichy district, Mogilev region.
Dokudovskoye Swamp	Дакудаўскае; Докудовское		Republican biological reserve	933	Raised bog	53.8004°N 25.4481°E	Remnant raised bog in Lida district, Grodno region. Swan Lake in center.
Kotrya Swamp	Котрянское болото		Republican landscape reserve, Ramsar site	6,138	Fen	53.8175°N 24.3670°E	Large forest-bog complex at the headwaters of the Kotra River in Kotra Forest, Shchuchyn district, Grodno region.
Mokhovoye Swamp	Болото Моховое		National park	983	Raised bog	54.9078°N 27.0953°E	Raised bog surrounding Lake Dyagili in Narochansky National Park, Myadel district, Minsk region.
Gaby Swamp	Габы		National park	4,397	Raised bog	54.8673°N 27.3303°E	Large raised bog with well-developed ridge-hollow complexes in Narochansky National Park, Myadel district, Minsk region.
Lebediny Moh	Лебединый Мох		Local wetland reserve, Ramsar site	2,584	Transition, raised bog	55.7347°N 29.0581°E	Complex of forests, bogs and lakes including Lake Stradan in Polatsk district, Vitebsk region.
Drozhbitka Swamp	Болото Дрожбитка		Republican wetland reserve, Ramsar site	2,293	Fen	55°35′N 29°23′E	Wetland complex including fens, bogs and 14 lakes in Polatsk district, Vitebsk region.
Dikoe Swamp	Дзікое; Дикое		National park, Ramsar site	6,967	Fen	52°47′N 24°14′E	One of the three largest undisturbed fen bogs in Polesie region, located in the watersheds of the Yaselda and Narew rivers. Limited cranberry harvesting occurs. In Belavezhskaya Pushcha National Park.
Zhada Swamp	Болото Жада		Republican wetland reserve	4,555	Forest-mire	55.4291°N 28.0168°E	A large forest-mire massif in the upper reaches of the Plavno River. Part of the swamp was previously drained and has become re-wetted. Includes open raised, transitional bogs and forested wetlands. In the central part there are two dystrophic lakes: Ilovo and Strechnо.
Vileity	Вилейты		Ramsar site	8,452	Fens and transitional mires	55°15′N 26°46′E	"a waterlogged forest with a complex of fen and transitional mires, floodplain meadows and marshes, rivers, oxbow lakes and a system of channels overgrown with woods."
Vydrytsa	Выдрыца; Выдрица		Ramsar site	17,403	Forested peatlands	52°44′N 29°40′E	"lies on a floodplain between the Berezina and Vydritsa rivers ... is a system of oxbow lakes, forested peatlands, meadows, marshes, swamps and drainage channels"

== Map ==
Major swamps of Belarus

== See also ==
- Geography of Belarus
- Category:Swamps of Belarus in Belarusian Wikipedia
- Swamp draining in Belarus
- Ramsar sites in Belarus
