= Calosoma cyanescens =

Scientific classification
- Domain: Eukaryota
- Kingdom: Animalia
- Phylum: Arthropoda
- Class: Insecta
- Order: Coleoptera
- Suborder: Adephaga
- Family: Carabidae
- Genus: Calosoma
- Species: C. cyanescens

Binomial name
- Calosoma cyanescens Motschulsky, 1859

Synonyms
- Calosoma shaanxiense Deuve & Mourzine in Deuve, 2000; Calosoma denserugatum Géhin, 1885

Species of beetle

Calosoma cyanescens is a species of ground beetle in the subfamily of Carabinae. It was described by Victor Motschulsky in 1859. This species is found in north-eastern China, North Korea, South Korea, northern Japan (Honshu and Hokkaido) and Russia (Siberia).

Adults reach a length of 16-28 mm.

== Taxonomy ==
This species is often treated as a subspecies of Calosoma inquisitor.
