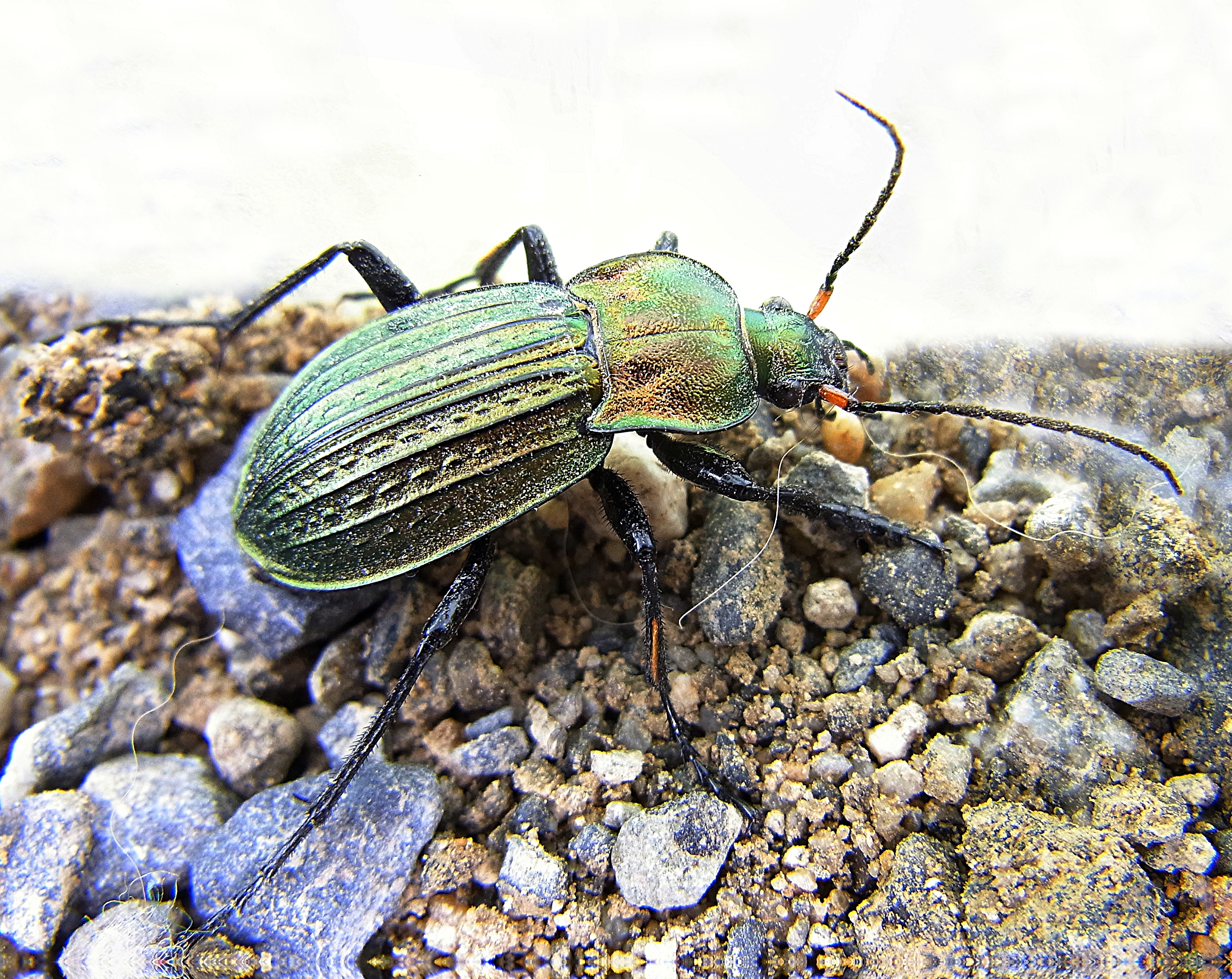

Scientific classification
- Kingdom: Animalia
- Phylum: Arthropoda
- Clade: Pancrustacea
- Class: Insecta
- Order: Coleoptera
- Suborder: Adephaga
- Family: Carabidae
- Genus: Carabus
- Species: C. cancellatus

Binomial name
- Carabus cancellatus Illiger, 1798

Synonyms
- Carabus hypsobius Apfelbeck, 1918; Carabus subscythicus Lie, 1996; Carabus gotzi Mandl, 1964; Carabus hanauensis Niedl, 1964; Carabus kubinyii Mandl, 1964; Carabus wirthumeri Mandl, 1964; Carabus baldianus Mandl, 1955; Carabus ingulensis Eidam, 1941; Carabus scabridus Eidam, 1941; Carabus transversus Eidam, 1941; Carabus kuntzeni Eidam, 1930; Carabus novotnyi Eidam, 1930; Carabus obscuriusculus Eidam, 1930; Carabus dolosus Csiki, 1927; Carabus semnonicus Csiki, 1927; Carabus munsteri Born, 1926; Carabus suspicax Everts, 1918; Carabus tersculptus A.Fleischer, 1917; Carabus balticus Bernau, 1915; Carabus charcoviensis Bernau, 1915; Carabus danubialis Bernau, 1915; Carabus maderi Born, 1915; Carabus pratensis Bernau, 1915; Carabus occiduus Bernau, 1914; Carabus assiduus H.J.Kolbe, 1913; Carabus australis Bernau, 1913; Carabus bucoviniacus H.J.Kolbe, 1913; Carabus carpathicus H.J.Kolbe, 1913; Carabus dobrudschensis Bernau, 1913; Carabus enitens H.J.Kolbe, 1913; Carabus gracilis H.J.Kolbe, 1913; Carabus infernalis H.J.Kolbe, 1913; Carabus kniephofi Langenhan, 1913; Carabus kuennemanni Langenhan, 1913; Carabus lapougeanus Langenhan, 1913; Carabus moldavicus H.J.Kolbe, 1913; Carabus occidentalis Bernau, 1913; Carabus oligoscythus H.J.Kolbe, 1913; Carabus oriundus H.J.Kolbe, 1913; Carabus planianensis Bernau, 1913; Carabus pseudobavaricus Bernau, 1913; Carabus rapax Bernau, 1913; Carabus romaniacus H.J.Kolbe, 1913; Carabus sarmaticus Bernau, 1913; Carabus scythicoides Bernau, 1913; Carabus setteli Langenhan, 1913; Carabus strictus H.J.Kolbe, 1913; Carabus subfallax Bernau, 1913; Carabus vorax Bernau, 1913; Carabus adelphus Kolbe, 1912; Carabus amitinus Kolbe, 1912; Carabus avunculus Kolbe, 1912; Carabus bavaricus Kolbe, 1912; Carabus fallax Kolbe, 1912; Carabus genuinus Kolbe, 1912; Carabus marchicus Kolbe, 1912; Carabus rauterbergi Kolbe, 1912; Carabus saxonicus Kolbe, 1912; Carabus spaneyi Kolbe, 1912; Carabus transitivus Kolbe, 1912; Carabus transsylvanicus Petri, 1912; Carabus thuringianus Born, 1911; Carabus wankae Sokolar, 1911; Carabus brdensis Bernau, 1910; Carabus interior Sokolar, 1910; Carabus opolanus Bernau, 1910; Carabus pseudoemarginatus Bernau, 1910; Carabus brevituberculatus Roubal, 1909; Carabus superior Sokolar, 1907; Carabus pseudoscythicus Csiki, 1906; Carabus sulinensis Csiki, 1906; Carabus ungensis Csiki, 1906; Carabus bucsecsianus Born, 1903; Carabus conspersus Lapouge, 1902; Carabus pseudotuberculatus Lapouge, 1902; Carabus rossicus Lapouge, 1902; Carabus sudeticus Schulz, 1901; Carabus anderseni Beuthin, 1896; Carabus bicolor Beuthin, 1896; Carabus durus Reitter, 1896; Carabus pseudograniger Reitter, 1896; Carabus sajanensis Reitter, 1896; Carabus conjunctus J.R.Lomnicki, 1892; Carabus femoralis Géhin, 1885; Carabus letzneri Kraatz, 1879; Carabus rufipes Kraatz, 1879; Carabus haematomerus Kraatz, 1878; Carabus cupreoaeneus Dalla Torre, 1877; Carabus rubrofemoratus Dalla Torre, 1877; Carabus punctulatus Schaum, 1856; Goniocarabus regressivus Poschinger, 1955; Carabus viridiaeneus Dalla Torre, 1877; Carabus affinis Gistel, 1857; Carabus scythicus Schaum, 1856; Carabus marginatus Letzner, 1849; Carabus rufofemoratus Letzner, 1849; Carabus viridis Letzner, 1849; Carabus verrucosus Heer, 1837; Carabus excisus Dejean, 1826; Carabus merlachii Dejean, 1826; Carabus tuberculatus Dejean, 182; Carabus semistriatus Fischer von Waldheim, 1823; Goniocarabus atroviridulus G.Müller, 1898; Carabus beszedesi Depoli, 1915; Goniocarabus novaki G.Müller, 1898; Goniocarabus nudilabrus G.Müller, 1898; Carabus ventricosus Bernau, 1915; Carabus schatzmayri Born, 1912; Carabus neoziegleri Deuve, 2003; Carabus planitialis Ghiretti, 1994; Carabus neoziegleri Deuve, 1991; Carabus obscuripennis Mandl, 1961; Carabus poschiavinus Born, 1922; Carabus ticinus Born, 1920; Carabus picciolii Bernau, 1915; Carabus luganensis Born, 1914; Carabus karstianus Bernau, 1911; Carabus tolminensis Bernau, 1911; Carabus aurosplendens Born, 1910; Carabus generosensis Born, 1906; Carabus collaris Lapouge, 1902; Carabus generoso Born, 1900; Carabus penninus Lapouge, 1898; Carabus sequensi Beuthin, 1898; Carabus tridentinus Bertoloni, 1887; Carabus ziegleri Kraatz, 1883; Carabus bohatschi Reitter, 1881; Carabus trentinus Kraatz, 1877; Carabus duftschmidi Géhin, 1876; Carabus oblongus Sturm, 1815; Carabus affinis Duftschmid, 1812; Carabus emarginatus Duftschmid, 1812; Carabus cassandrae Mollard, 2004; Carabus pelissieri Darnaud, 1978; Carabus eques Lapouge, 1925; Carabus delaunayi Barthe, 1924; Carabus viridis Everts, 1918; Carabus ehlersi Bernau, 1915; Carabus pyrenaeus Bernau, 1915; Carabus simulator Everts, 1915; Carabus houlberti Bleuse, 1914; Carabus nigellus Bleuse, 1914; Carabus progressivus Kolbe, 1912; Carabus subcarinatus Kolbe, 1912; Carabus confinis Lapouge in Barthe, 1908; Carabus acicularis Lapouge, 1902; Carabus asidoides Lapouge, 1902; Carabus inornatus Lapouge, 1902; Carabus astur Lapouge, 1898; Carabus celticus Lapouge, 1898; Carabus crassus Lapouge, 1898; Carabus misellus Lapouge, 1898; Carabus pyrenaicus Lapouge, 1898; Carabus nigrinus Beuthin, 1896; Carabus pseudocarinatus Beuthin, 1896; Carabus aveyronensis Beuthin, 1895; Carabus tarnensis Géhin, 1885; Carabus dolens Kraatz, 1879; Carabus carinatus Charpentier, 1825; Carabus assimilis Duftschmid, 1812; Goniocarabus ater A.Fleischer, 1898; Carabus bibanensis Lie, 1994; Carabus pompilii Savulescu, 1992; Carabus geta Lapouge, 1925; Carabus disseptus H.J.Kolbe, 1913; Carabus fraternus H.J.Kolbe, 1913; Carabus insperatus H.J.Kolbe, 1913; Carabus rbanyensis Bernau, 1913; Carabus resiczabanyensis Csiki, 1913; Carabus romaniensis H.J.Kolbe, 1913; Carabus mazurai A.Fleischer, 1910; Carabus coloripes A.Fleischer, 1898; Carabus basalis Beuthin, 1896; Carabus biharicus Reitter, 1896; Carabus rufoscapus Beuthin, 1896; Carabus subgraniger Reitter, 1896; Carabus muehlfeldi Géhin, 1885; Carabus nicanor Haury, 1878; Carabus moestus Dejean, 1831; Goniocarabus nigripennis A.Fleischer, 1898; Goniocarabus oxycancellatus A.Fleischer, 1898; Carabus szobroniensis Géhin, 1885; Carabus pustuliger Eidam, 1941; Carabus simeoni Eidam, 1941; Carabus drenskyi Breuning, 1928; Carabus zoufali A.Fleischer, 1922; Carabus duvnensis Bernau, 1914; Carabus annisus H.J.Kolbe, 1913; Carabus mimus H.J.Kolbe, 1913; Carabus kocae Born, 1910; Carabus ambicornis Sokolar, 1907; Carabus livnensis Born, 1906; Carabus apfelbecki Born, 1904; Carabus balcanicus Born, 1899; Carabus islamitus Reitter, 1899; Carabus maximus Haury, 1880; Carabus nigricornis Dejean, 1826; Goniocarabus pseudocancellatus A.Fleischer, 1898; Carabus leithaicus Mandl, 1955; Carabus budensis Csiki, 1946; Carabus vogeli Breuning, 1932; Carabus adeptus H.J.Kolbe, 1913; Carabus electus H.J.Kolbe, 1913; Carabus inceptus H.J.Kolbe, 1913; Carabus nattereri H.J.Kolbe, 1913; Carabus tatricus H.J.Kolbe, 1913; Carabus soproniensis Dejean, 1826

= Carabus cancellatus =

Species of beetle

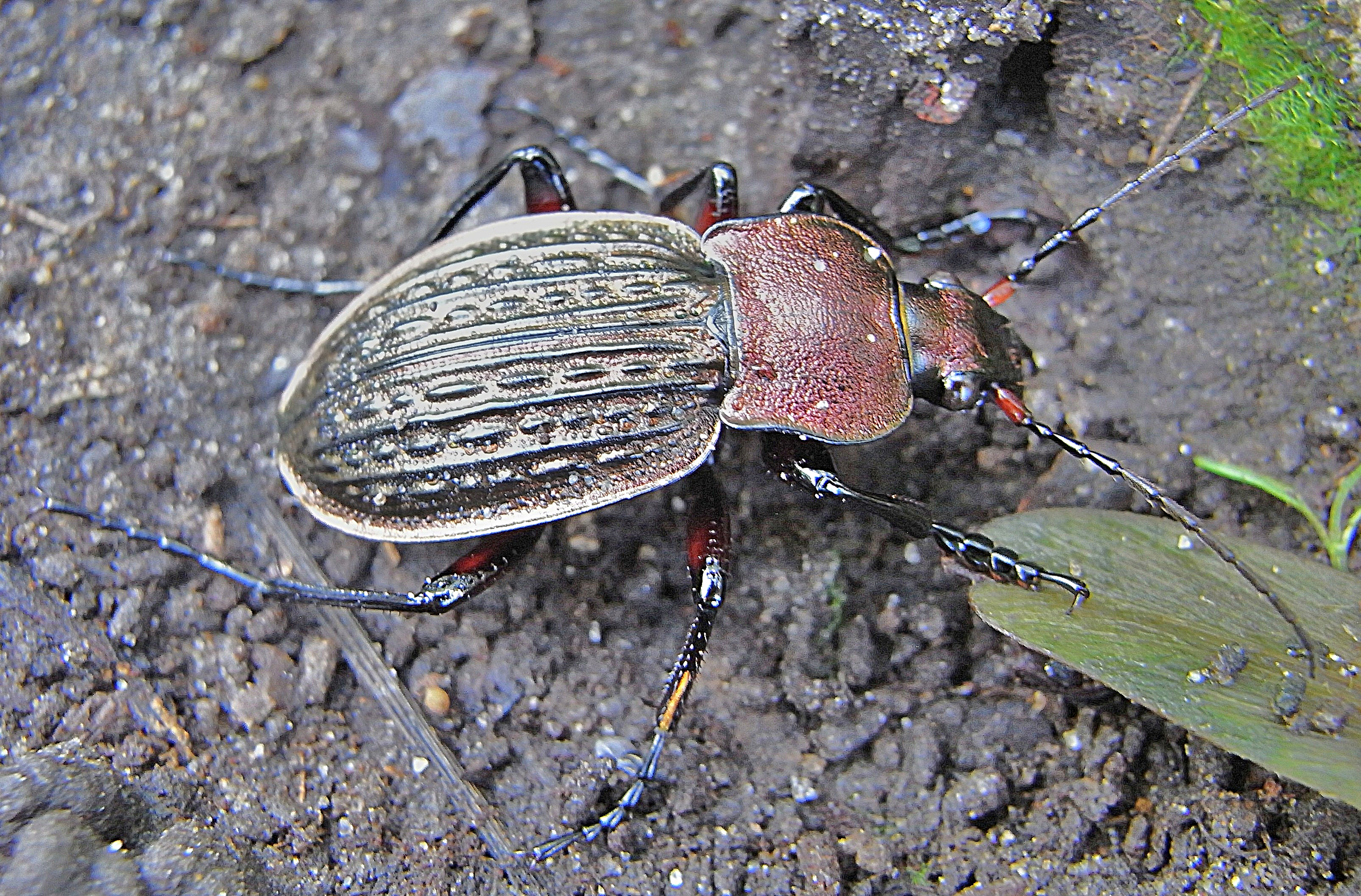
Carabus cancellatus tibiscinus

Carabus cancellatus, the latticed worm and slug hunter, is a ground beetle common in Central- and Northern Europe and Siberia. It has also been introduced into North America. It inhabits open country areas.

Its length is 17–32 millimetres (0.67–1.26 in).Adults are mostly nocturnal, but also diurnal during the reproductive period.

== Subspecies ==
It has several subspecies:

- Carabus cancellatus alessiensis Apfelbeck 1901 (Albania)
- Carabus cancellatus cancellatus Illiger, 1798 (Denmark, Norway, Sweden, Finland, Germany, Switzerland, Austria, Czechia, Slovakia, Hungary, Poland, Estonia, Latvia, Lithuania, Belarus, Ukraine, Romania, Moldova, Kazakhstan, Russia)
- Carabus cancellatus corpulentus Kraatz, 1880 (Croatia, former Yugoslavia, Montenegro)
- Carabus cancellatus dahli Heer, 1841 (Switzerland, Austria, Italy, Slovenia, Croatia, Bosnia-Herzegovina)
- Carabus cancellatus fusus Palliardi, 1825 (France, Belgium, Netherlands, Germany, Switzerland, Spain)
- Carabus cancellatus graniger Palliardi, 1825 (former Yugoslavia, Romania)
- Carabus cancellatus intermedius Dejean, 1826 (Austria, Hungary, Slovenia, Croatia, Bosnia-Herzegovina, former Yugoslavia, Bulgaria, Turkey)
- Carabus cancellatus tibiscinus Csiki, 1906 (Austria, Slovakia, Hungary, former Yugoslavia, Romania)
