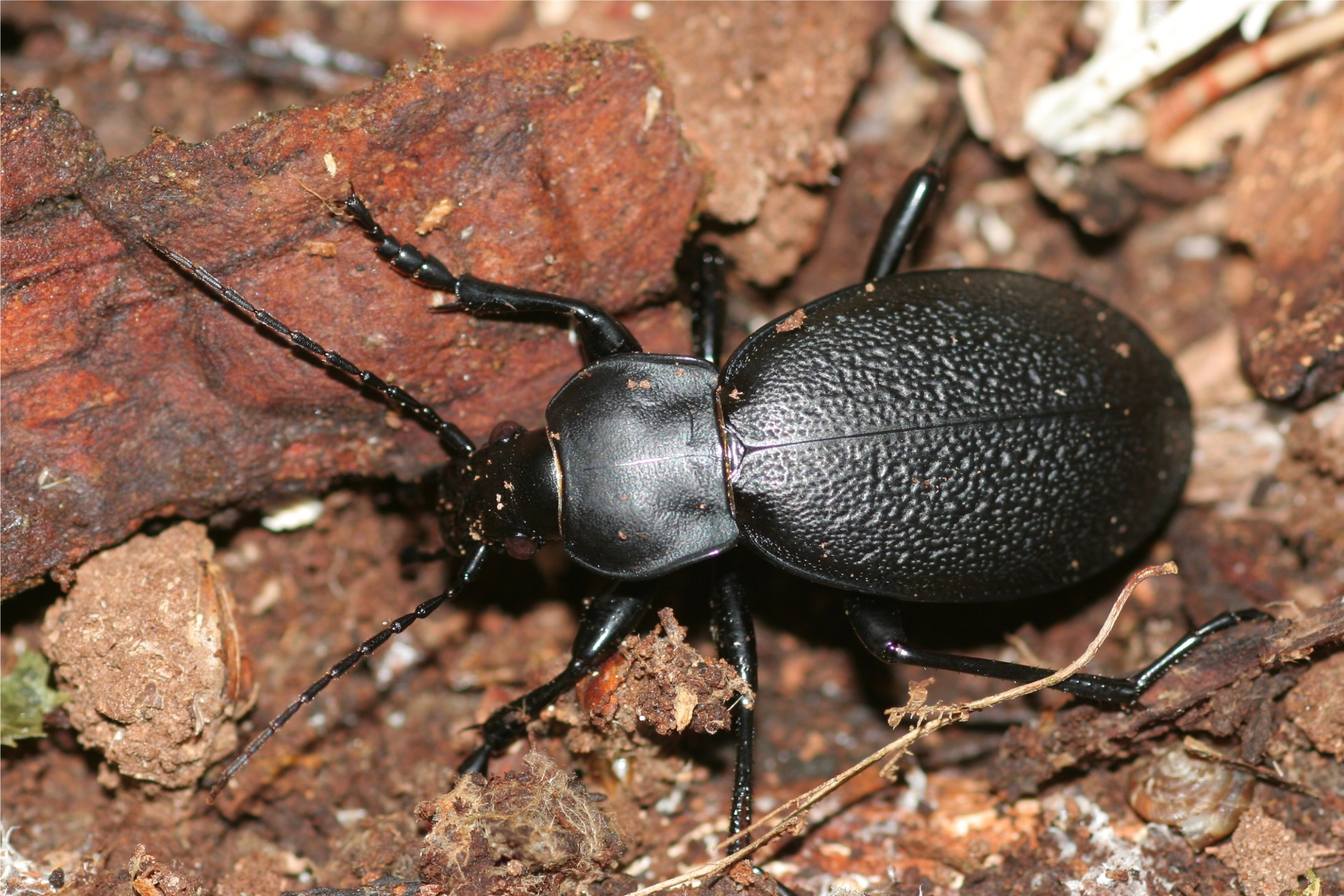

Scientific classification
- Kingdom: Animalia
- Phylum: Arthropoda
- Class: Insecta
- Order: Coleoptera
- Suborder: Adephaga
- Family: Carabidae
- Genus: Carabus
- Species: C. coriaceus

Binomial name
- Carabus coriaceus Linnaeus, 1758

= Carabus coriaceus =

Species of beetle

Carabus coriaceus

Carabus coriaceus, commonly known as the leather beetle, is a species of beetle widespread in Europe, where it is primarily found in deciduous forests and mixed forests. The species undergoes aestivation during the hottest, driest parts of the summer.

== Etymology ==
The leather beetle got its name from its appearance, resembling leather. This, in turn, is also how it got its scientific name, C. coriaceus, as 'coriaceus' means 'leathery' in English.
