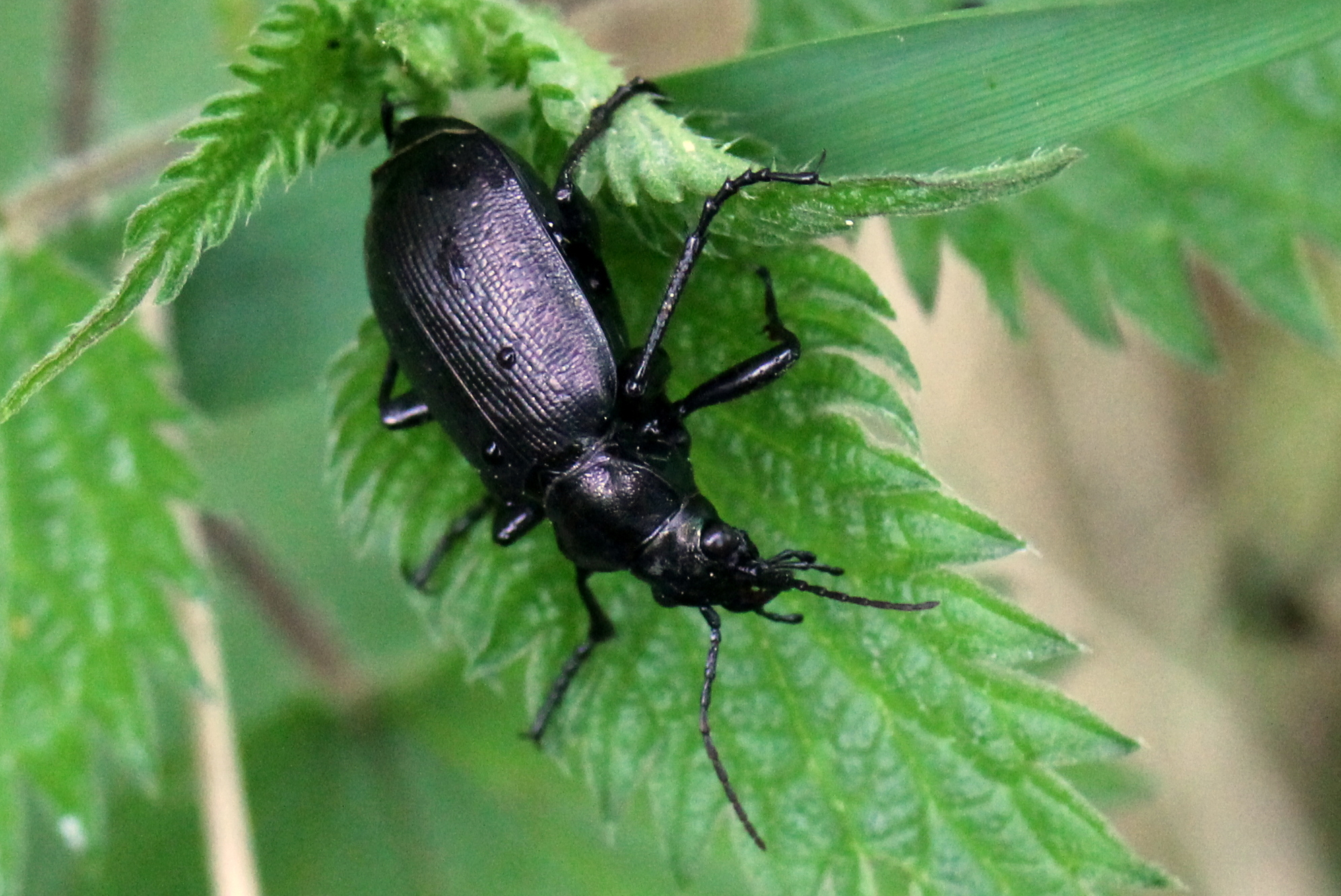

Scientific classification
- Kingdom: Animalia
- Phylum: Arthropoda
- Class: Insecta
- Order: Coleoptera
- Suborder: Adephaga
- Superfamily: Caraboidea
- Family: Carabidae
- Subfamily: Carabinae
- Tribe: Carabini
- Genus: Calosoma
- Species: C. inquisitor

Binomial name
- Calosoma inquisitor (Linnaeus, 1758)

Synonyms
- Carabus inquisitor Linnaeus, 1758; Calosoma viridescens Reitter, 1896; Calosoma clathratum Kolenati, 1845; Calosoma moestum Csiki, 1944; Calosoma comanense Lapouge, 1930; Calosoma cupreofulgens Chapman, 1922; Calosoma coeruleum Ragusa, 1883; Calosoma funereum Ragusa, 1883; Calosoma violaceum Westhoff, 1881; Calosoma nudum Dalla Torre, 1877; Calosoma obscurum Dalla Torre, 1877; Calosoma pulchrum Dalla Torre, 1877; Calosoma viridulum Kraatz, 1877; Calosoma batnense Lallemant, 1868; Calosoma punctiventre Reiche & Saulcy, 1855; Calosoma coeruleomarginatum Letzner, 1850; Calosoma coeruleum Letzner, 1850; Calosoma cupreum Letzner, 1850; Calosoma nigrum Letzner, 1850; Calosoma obscurum Letzner, 1850; Calosoma varians Letzner, 1850; Calosoma viridimarginatum Letzner, 1850; Buprestis antiqua Geoffroy in Fourcroy, 1785

= Calosoma inquisitor =

Species of beetle

Calosoma inquisitor (the lesser searcher beetle or caterpillar-hunter) is a species of ground beetle. The species is found in northern Africa, Europe (northward to southern Scandinavia) and East to Asia Minor, Iran and the Caucasus, with isolated populations in eastern Siberia and Japan (although these are also treated as a separate species Calosoma cyanescens by some authors).

The imagines are predatory on various insects and their larvae, especially, feed on Lepidoptera larvae. They can fly well and are found not only on the ground, but also in bushes and on trees. In case of danger the beetle can fall and then threaten by lifting up the front body and spreading the mandibles. The females lay about 50 eggs. The hatching larvae are also predatory and develop very quickly. They're in the ground. The beetles emerge in June, but still linger in a diapause until next spring in the ground.

== Subspecies ==
- Calosoma inquisitor inquisitor (Ireland, Great Britain, Denmark, Norway, Sweden, Finland, France, Belgium, Netherlands, Germany, Switzerland, Austria, Czechia, Slovakia, Hungary, Poland, Estonia, Latvia, Lithuania, Ukraine, Portugal, Spain, Italy, Slovenia, Croatia, Bosnia-Herzegovina, former Yugoslavia, North Macedonia, Albania, Greece, Bulgaria, Romania, Moldova, Morocco, Syria, Turkey, Iran, Russia)
- Calosoma inquisitor cupreum Dejean, 1826 (Iran, Armenia, Azerbaijan, Russia)
