= Yelnya Swamp =

Wetland nature reserve in Belarus

Yelnya Swamp Bałota Yelnia Балота Ельня
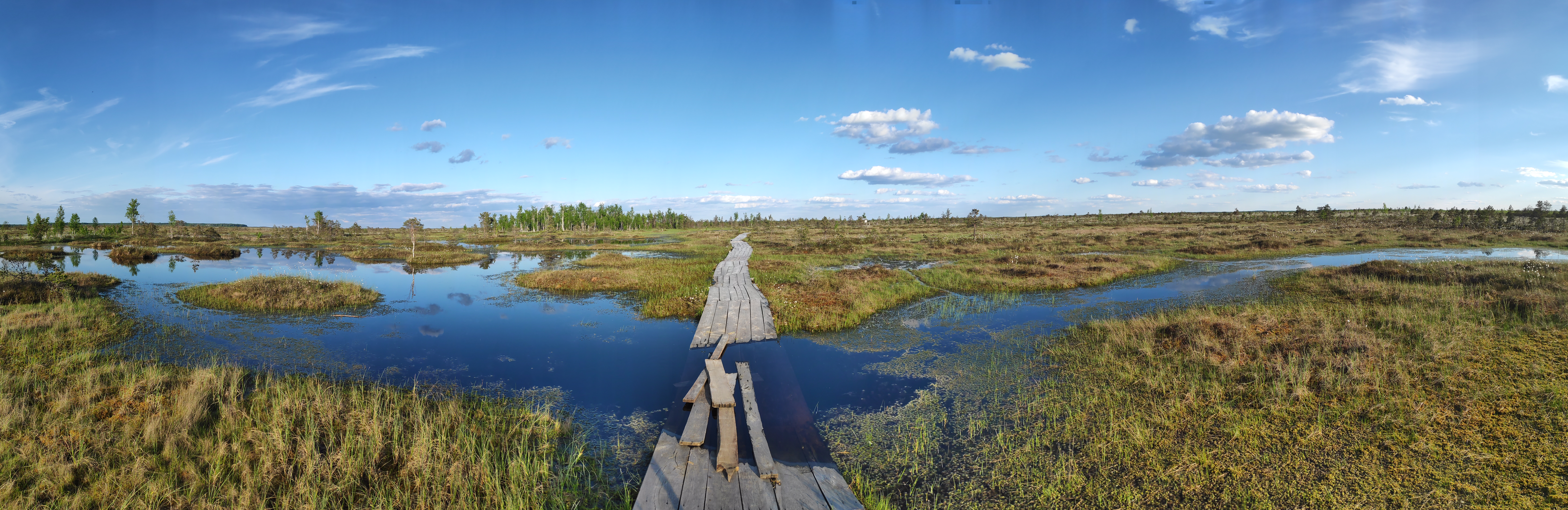

- Location within Belarus
- Location: Vitebsk Oblast, Belarus
- Coordinates: 55.5758°N 27.8647°E
- Area: 253.01 sq km
- Elevation: 139

Ramsar Wetland
- Official name: Yelnia
- Designated: 21 October 2002
- Reference no.: 1218

Yelnya Swamp (Belarusian: Балота Ельня) is the biggest swamp complex in Belarus. The swamps cover 253.01 square kilometers and considered to be more than 9000 years old. The Landscape Reserve "Yelnya" was founded in 1968.

== History ==
Yelnya Swamp is one of the oldest swamps in Belarus and was formed 12821 – 13114 years ago.

== Biodiversity ==
Yelnya swamp is a stopping point for birds that migrate from the north through Belarus for wintering in Israel and North Africa. About 50 pairs of cranes stay here for nesting.

More than 405 species of plants grow in the bog, 13 of them are listed as an endangered species. Approximately 150 bird species live and nest here.
