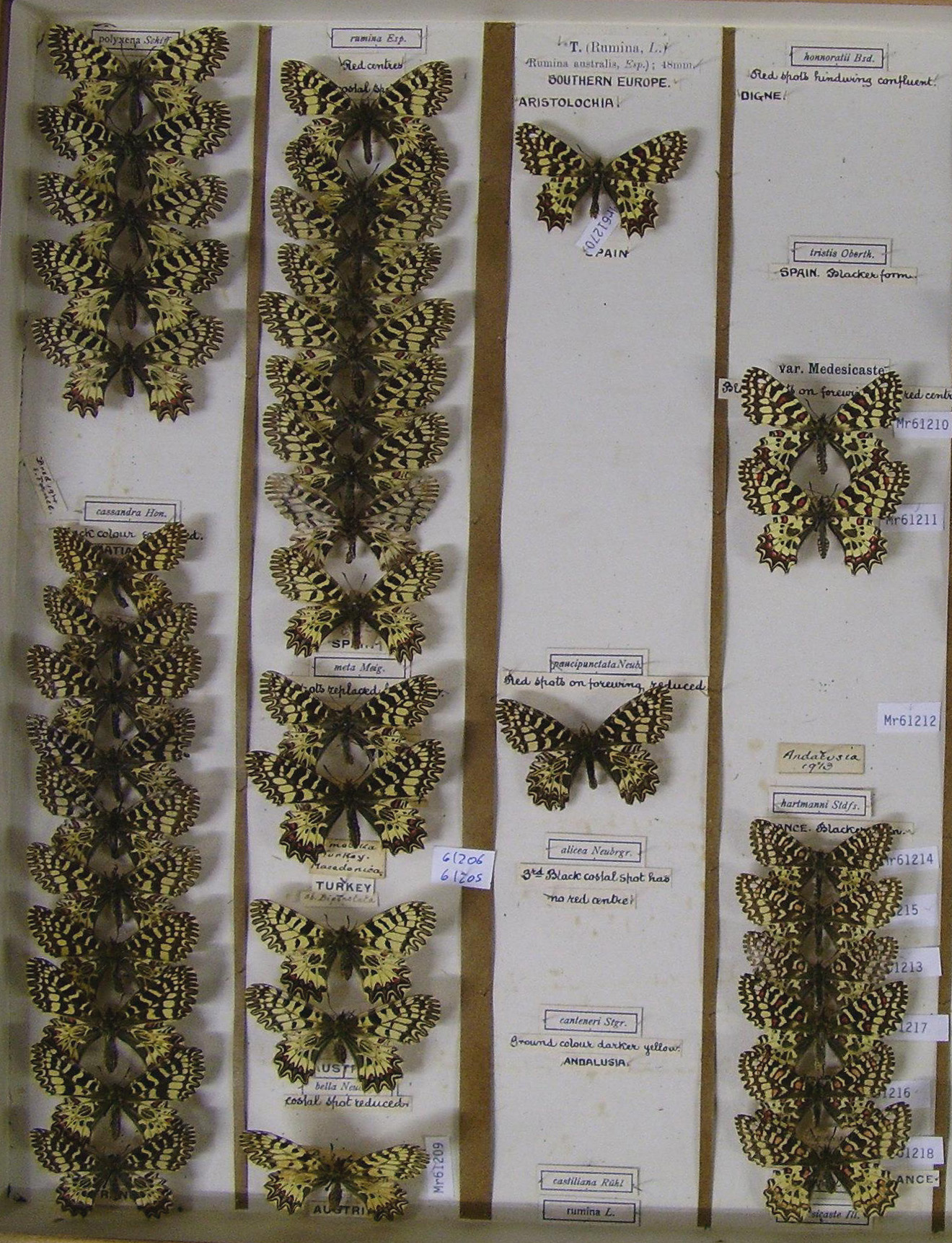
- Zerynthia specimens

Scientific classification
- Kingdom: Animalia
- Phylum: Arthropoda
- Class: Insecta
- Order: Lepidoptera
- Family: Papilionidae
- Tribe: Zerynthiini
- Genus: Zerynthia; Ochsenheimer, 1816

Species
- See text

Synonyms
- See text

= Zerynthia =

Genus of butterflies

Zerynthia is a genus of swallowtail butterflies placed in the subfamily Parnassiinae. The genus has a complex history; a multiplicity of names have been applied to its species.

== Species ==
Zerynthia consists of the following species:

Eggs	Caterpillar	Butterfly	Scientific name	Distribution
			Zerynthia polyxena - (Denis & Schiffermüller, 1775)	southern Europe (southeastern France, Italy, Slovakia and Greece) covering all the Balkans and reaching the south of Kazakhstan and the Urals.
			Zerynthia rumina - (Linnaeus, 1758)	North Africa, the Iberian Peninsula and southern France.

== Taxonomy ==
See Ackery (1975), Larsen (1973), Kuhna (1977) Kocak (1975, 1977) , de Freina (1979) Vazrick Nazari and Felix A. H. Sperling (2007). Ackery (1975) pointed out that Zerynthia is a junior synonym of Parnalius Rafinesque, 1815 published as a replacement name for the preoccupied Thais Fabricius and moreover correctly listed by Sherborne (1929) Neave (1940) and Cowan (1970). Parnalius has subsequently been suppressed cf. The Bulletin of Zoological Nomenclature. 36 (1979): 102)

=== Synonymy ===
- Zerynthia Ochsenheimer, 1816
- Thais Fabricius, 1807 (Systema glossatorum: XI): typus moneat.; junior homonym of Thais Roding, 1789.
- Thais Fabricius, 1807 (Mag. fur Insektenkunde 6: 283) type Papilio hypsiphyle Fabricius by monotypy.
- Parnalius Rafinesque, 1815 (Analyse Nat.: 128) type by Art. 67 (1): Papilio hypsiphyle Fabricius.
- Zerynthia Ochsenheimer, 1816 (Schmett. Europ. 4: 128) type polyxena Schiff, selected by Scudder; n.n. pro Thais Fabricius. subspecies polyxena, medisicaste, rumina.
- Eugraphis (Dalman i.l.) Billberg, 1820 (Ennum. Ins.: 75) type hypsiphyle Fabricius by monotypy.
- Zerinthia Sodovsky, 1837 (Bulletin de la Société Imperiale des Naturalistes de Moscou. 1834 (10): 82: nom. emend. pro Zerynthia Ochs.
- Cerynthia Staudinger, 1861 (Staudinger and Wocke: Cat. Lep. Europ. (1): 1: nom. emend.
- Zerynthyia Zerny, 1927 (Eos, Madrid 3: 313): nom. emend.
- Thays Rocci, 1928 (Boll. Soc. Ent. Ital. 10: 55): nom. emend.
- Allancastria Bryk, 1934 (Parnassiana 2: 104) type cerisyi Godart by monotypy: synonymised by Ackery, 1975. NOTE: subsequent researchers have typically not considered Allancastria to be a synonym, and treat it either as a valid genus (e.g.) or as a valid subgenus within Zerynthia (e.g.).
