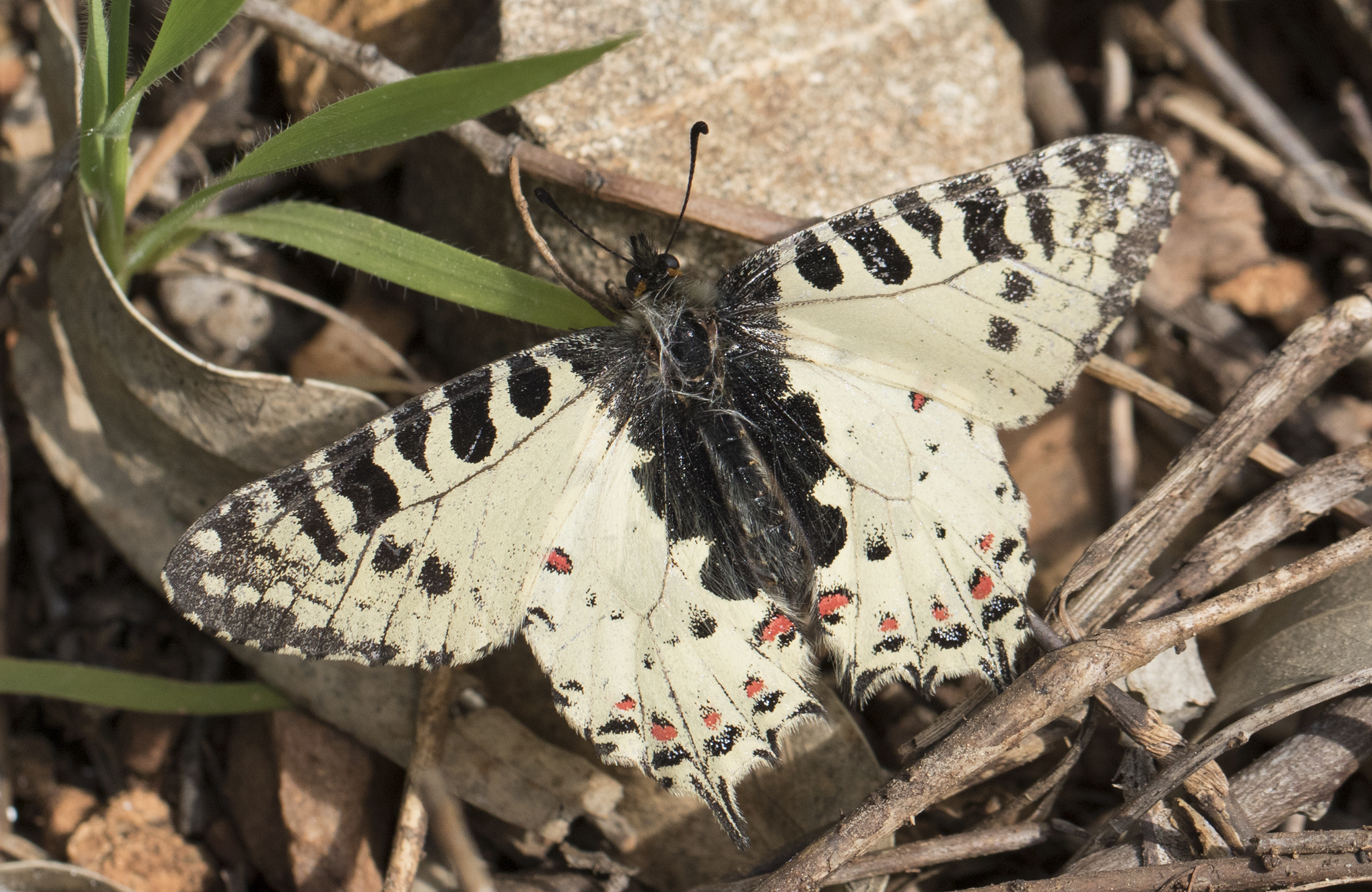
- Allancastria cerisyi

Scientific classification
- Kingdom: Animalia
- Phylum: Arthropoda
- Clade: Pancrustacea
- Class: Insecta
- Order: Lepidoptera
- Family: Papilionidae
- Tribe: Zerynthiini
- Genus: Allancastria; Bryk, 1932

Species
- See text

= Allancastria =

Genus of butterflies

Allancastria is a genus of Palaearctic swallowtail butterflies in the subfamily Parnassiinae. Five species are known. The genus has a complex history.

== Taxonomy ==
The genus consists of the following species:

- Allancastria caucasica - (Lederer, 1864)
- Allancastria cerisyi - (Godart, 1824) eastern festoon
- Allancastria cretica - (Rebel, 1904)
- Allancastria deyrollei - (Oberthür, 1869)
- Allancastria louristana - (Le Cerf, 1908)

== Food plant ==
Species in this genus feed on Aristolochia species.
