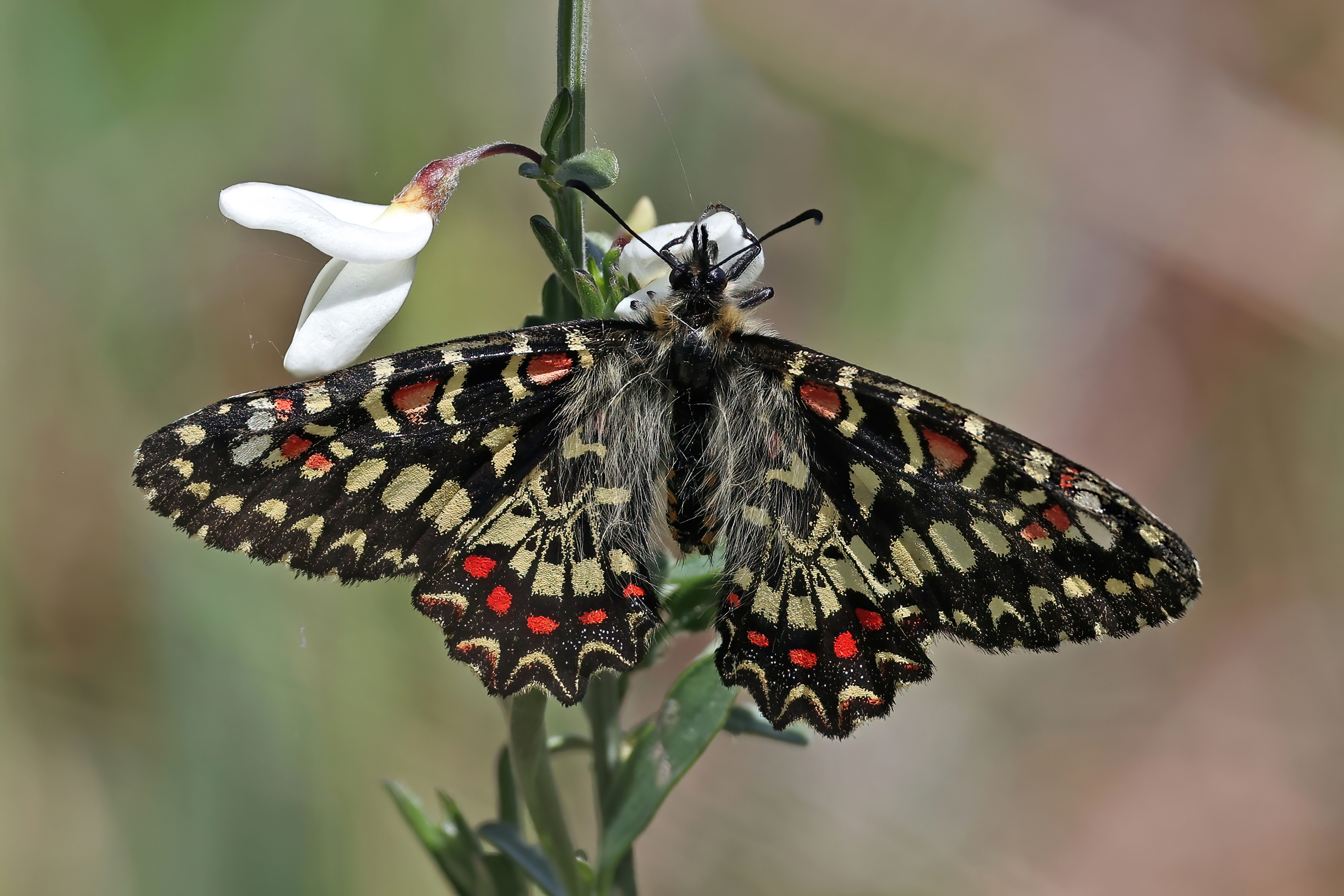

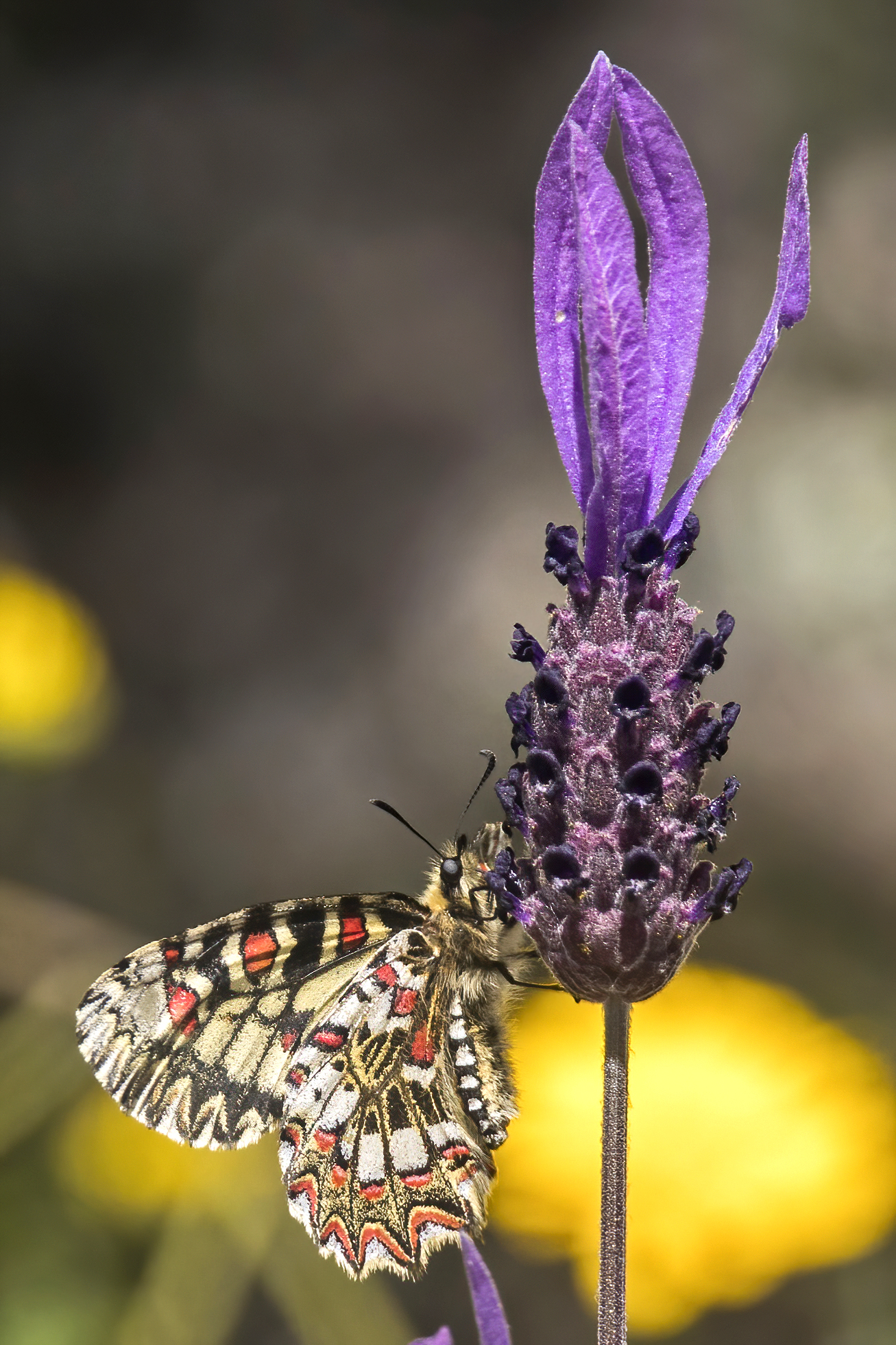

Scientific classification
- Kingdom: Animalia
- Phylum: Arthropoda
- Clade: Pancrustacea
- Class: Insecta
- Order: Lepidoptera
- Family: Papilionidae
- Genus: Zerynthia
- Species: Z. rumina

Binomial name
- Zerynthia rumina (Linnaeus, 1758)

= Zerynthia rumina =

Species of butterfly

Zerynthia rumina, the Spanish festoon, is a butterfly belonging to the family Papilionidae. It is a widespread species in Iberia and frequents most habitats.

== Distribution ==
North Africa, the Iberian Peninsula and southern France.

== Description ==
Zerynthia rumina is an extremely striking species. In south east France it can be confused with the southern festoon (Zerynthia polyxena). The two can be told apart by the presence of blue on the hindwing of the southern festoon. The Spanish festoon also has extensive red on the forewings.

== Description in Seitz ==
T. rumina L. (10 a). At once distinguished from polyxena by the totally different underside of the hindwing, which bears whitish yellow spots at the base. Nearly all the costal spots of the forewing are marked with red. The 3 or 4 black parallel cell-bars of polyxena are in rumina enlarged, being separated by thin yellow bands. In Spain and Portugal, also in Morocco and Algiers, but occurring here only in the coast districts in a slightly different form (10 a). — In ab. canteneri Stgr. (10 a), which occurs singly among ordinary rumina in South Spain and Morocco, the ground-colour is dark yellow, almost orange, the transparent apical spot being therefore very prominent, appearing bright silvery. — ab. honnorati Boisd. (10a). is the name of a form in which the red colour is very much extended, the spots of the hindwing merging together to an often broad purple-band. This form occurs in South France, especially in the neighbourhood of Digne, but only very sparingly, the ordinary form of South France being medesicaste Ill. (10 a), in which the black spots of the forewing are mostly centred with red, while the red spots of the hindwing remain separate. — Also of these forms melanotic aberrations have been found, that of the Spanish rumina being named tristis Oberth., while the black form of the French medesicaste is hartmanni Stdfss. — In ab. paucipunctata Neub. all the red spots of the forewing are reduced, whUe in ab. alicea Neub. the third (reduced) black costal spot has no red centre. — Transitions from typical rumina to medesicaste are named ab. castiliana, from Castilia. — Larva yellow, red, or blackish, with short pale stripes and yellowish red tubercles bearing black hairs; earh' summer, on Aristolochia. Pupa grey -brown, variegated with black. — The butterflies are on the wing in spring, in the South already in February, in North Spain late in March; they are found on sunny slopes and in vineyards, settling especially often on Asphodelus.

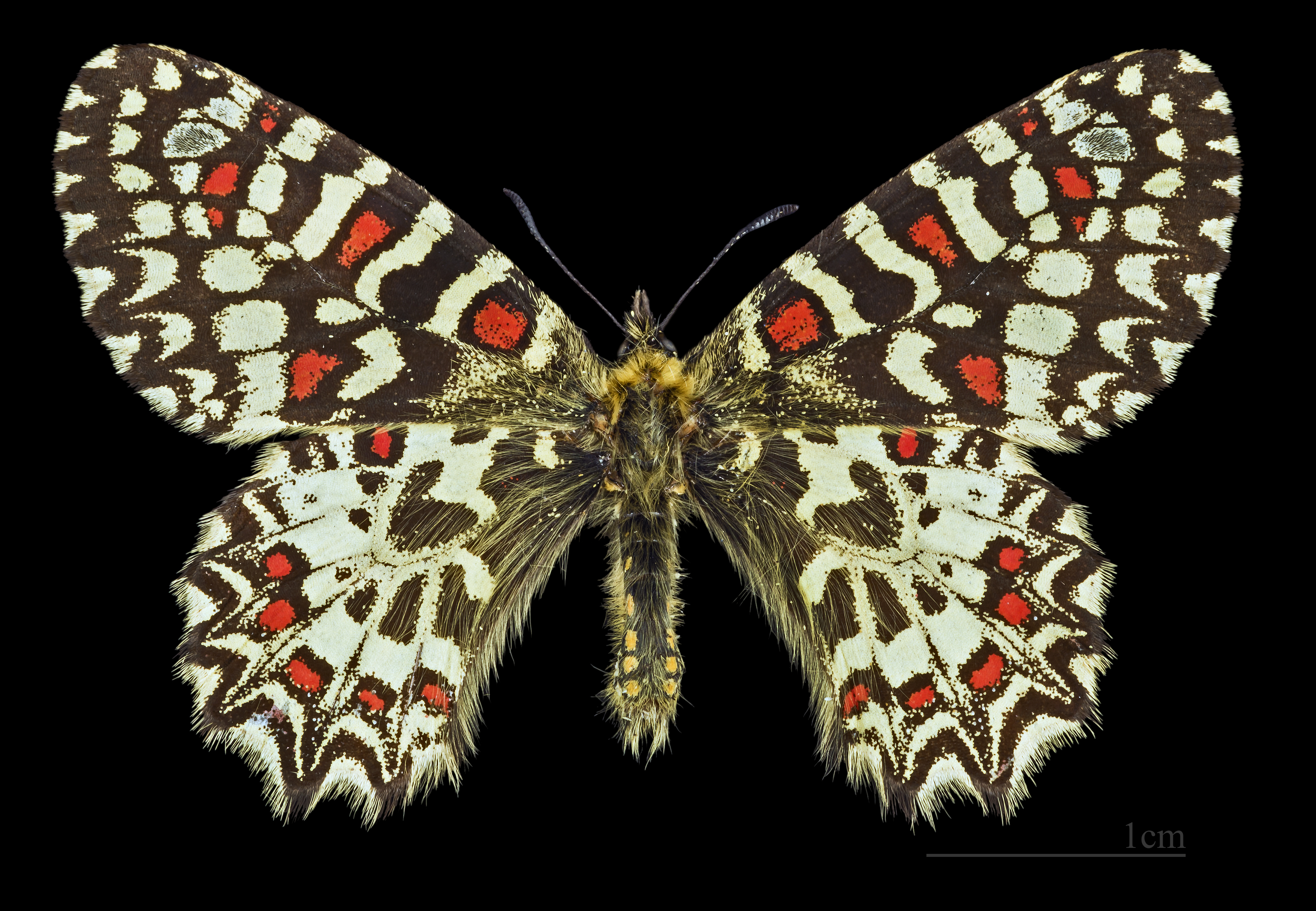
Male

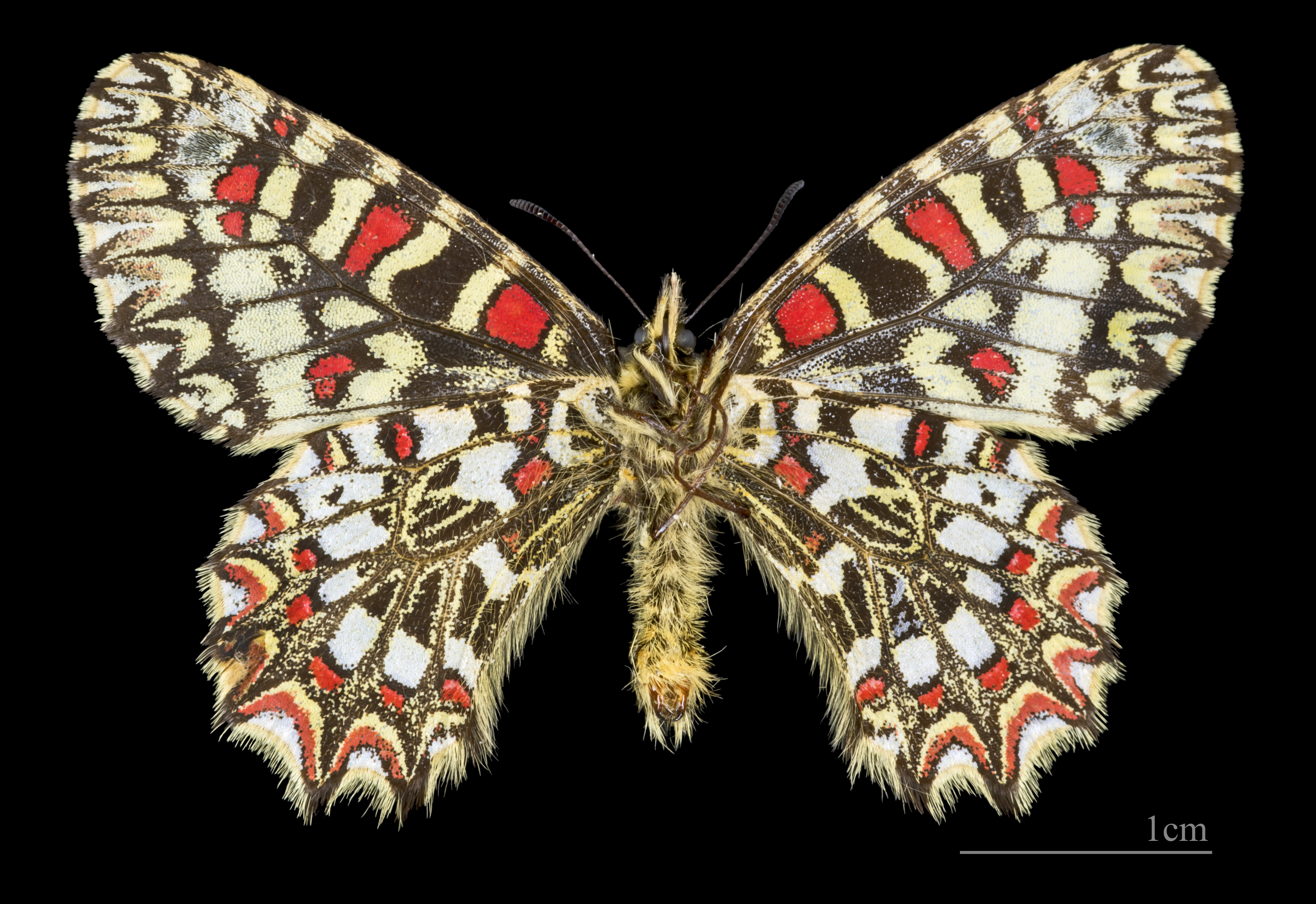
Male underside

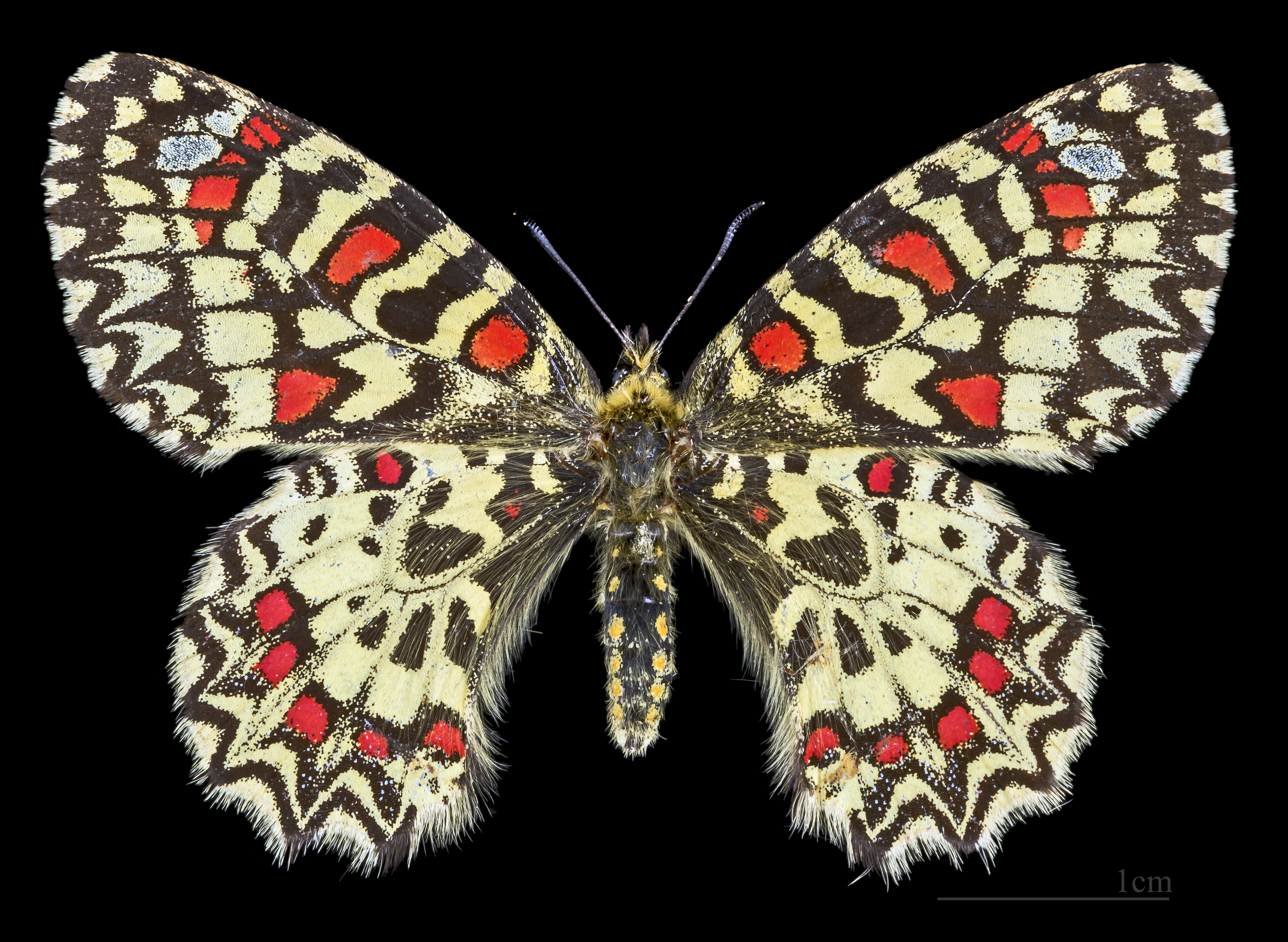
Female

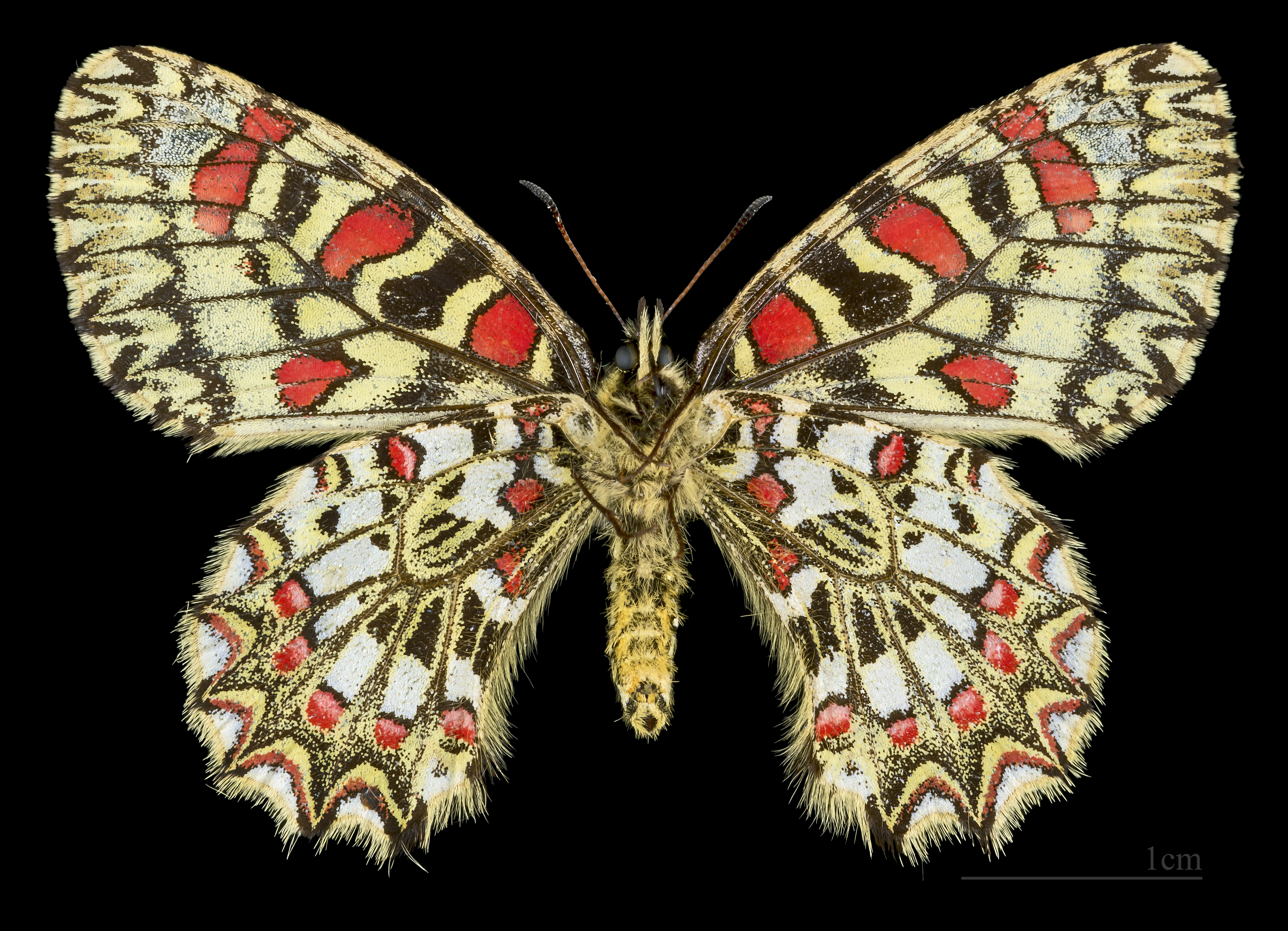
Female underside
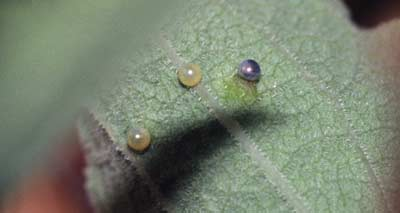
Eggs

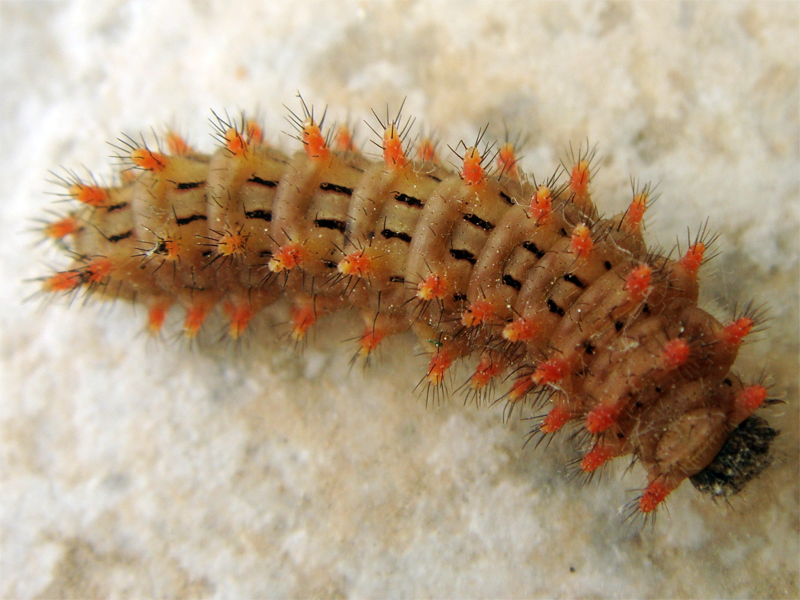
Caterpillar

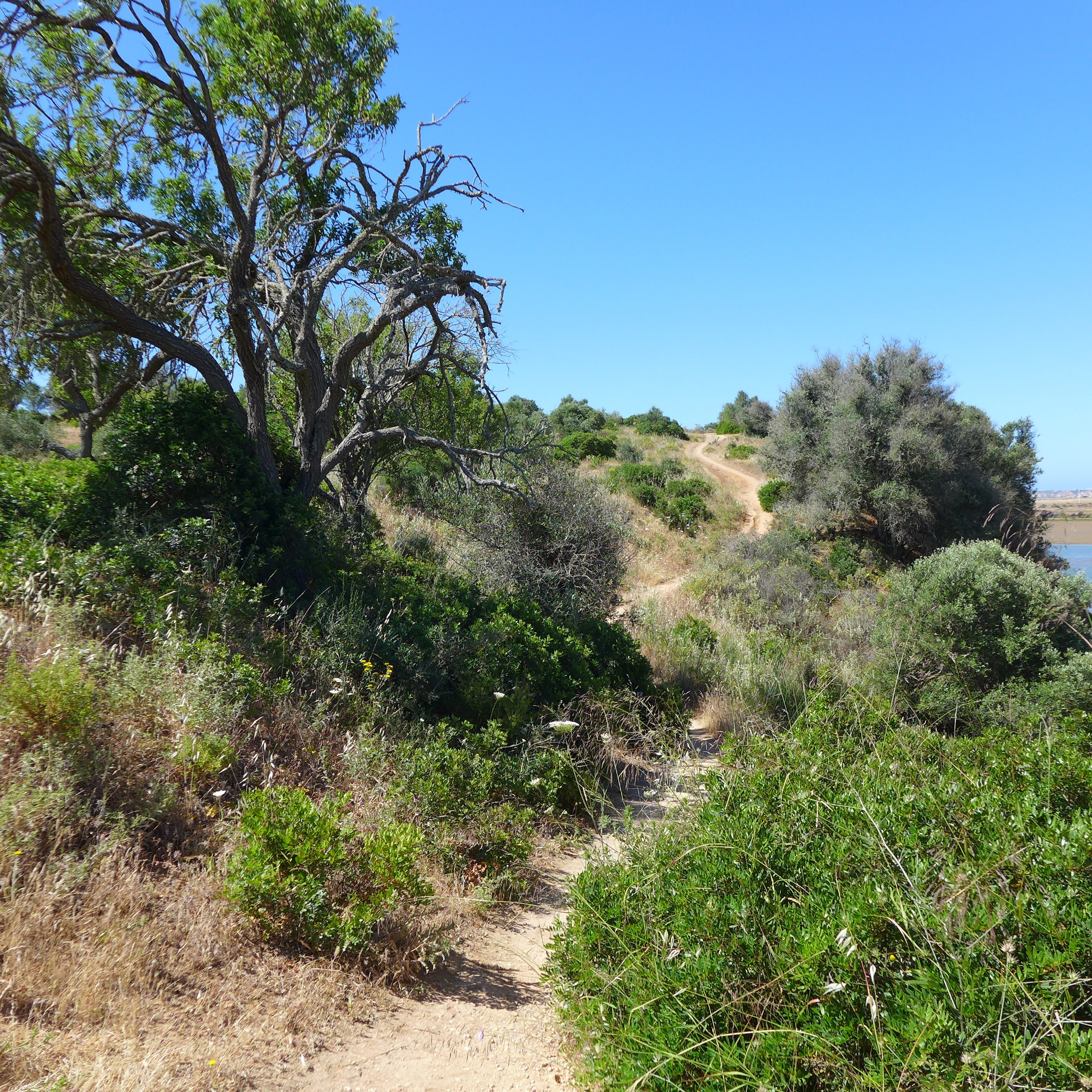
Habitat, Algarve, Portugal

== Flight period ==
The flight period is generally in April and May with the possibility of a very small second brood in September.

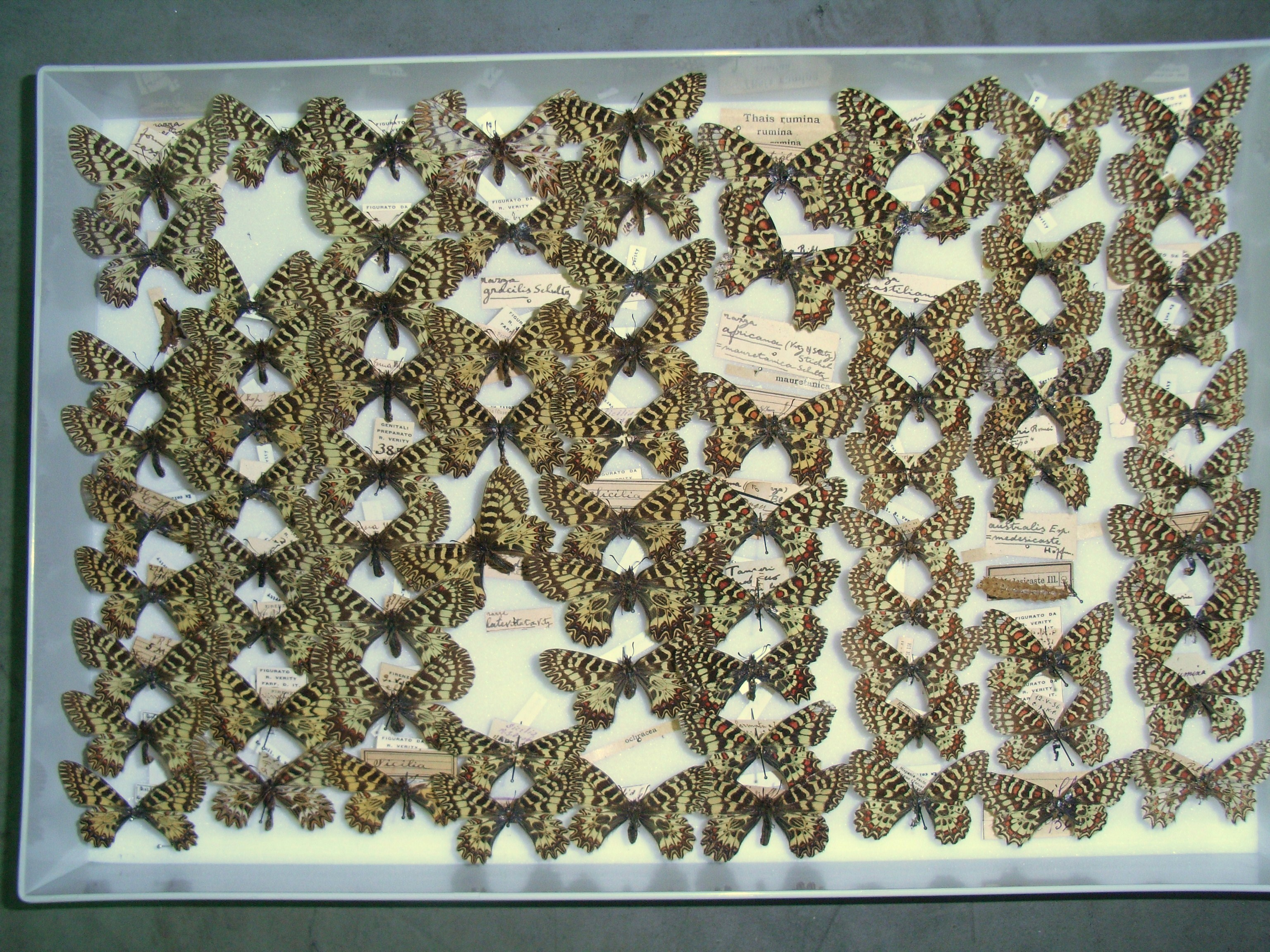
Roger Verity Collection in La Specola, form names of Zerynthia

== Synonymy ==
This species represents an extreme example of oversplitting.

- rumina Linnaeus (=andalusica Ribbe 1910) (south Spain: Andalusia).
  - form tristis Verity
  - form semitristis de Sagorra, 1930
  - form xanthe Schultz, 1908 (mackeri Holland, 1910)
  - form rubistriga Bryk
  - form honorathii Boisduval, 1832
  - form ochracea Staudinger, 1861
  - form medicaste Illiger
  - form andalusica Ribbe, 1910
  - form paucipunctata Neuburger
  - form minusculus Eisner
  - form lusitanica Bryk, 1932 (Portugal: Lisbon, Algarve, Sintra, Porto, Leça da Palmeira)
  - form semitristis de Sagarra, 1930
  - form paucipunctata Neuburger
  - form ornatissima Blachier, 1908
  - form nigricans Eisner
  - form minusculus Eisner
  - form aperta Eisner
  - form divisa Schultz, 1908
  - form canteneri Staudinger, 1861
- ornatior Blachier, 1905 = africana (Stichel, 1907), = mauretanica Schultz, 1908 (Northern Africa: Algeria, Morocco: Tangier). The name ornatior is not the correct one for the northern African representative. canteneri (Heydenrich i.l.) Staudinger, 1861 (= canteneri Heyd. 1851, was originally applied to African populations and is the valid name, cf. Cajetan Felder and Rudolf Felder (1864), Rothschild (1917), canteneri is generally considered a European form but the type locality was fixed 'Algeria' by Cajetan and Rudolf Felder (l.c.) whereas Staudinger (1861) only, and apparently erroneously, referred the name to the Iberian form ochracea. Manley and Allcard (1970) following Bryk (1934) referred to canteneri Staudinger as an orange aberration of both sexes which is frequent in Morocco but occasionally appears in warmer parts of south Spain.
  - form irregularis Holland, 1912
  - form distorta Rothschild, 1918
  - form ornatissima Blachier, 1908
  - form nebulosa Holland, 1912
  - form xanthe Schultze, 1908
  - form honorathii Boisduval, 1832
  - form poujadei Thierry-Meg, 1910
  - form canteneri Staudinger, 1861
  - form nigricans Holland, 1912
  - form minusculus Eisner
  - form posteriorrubromarginalis Eisner
  - form paucipunctata Neuburger
