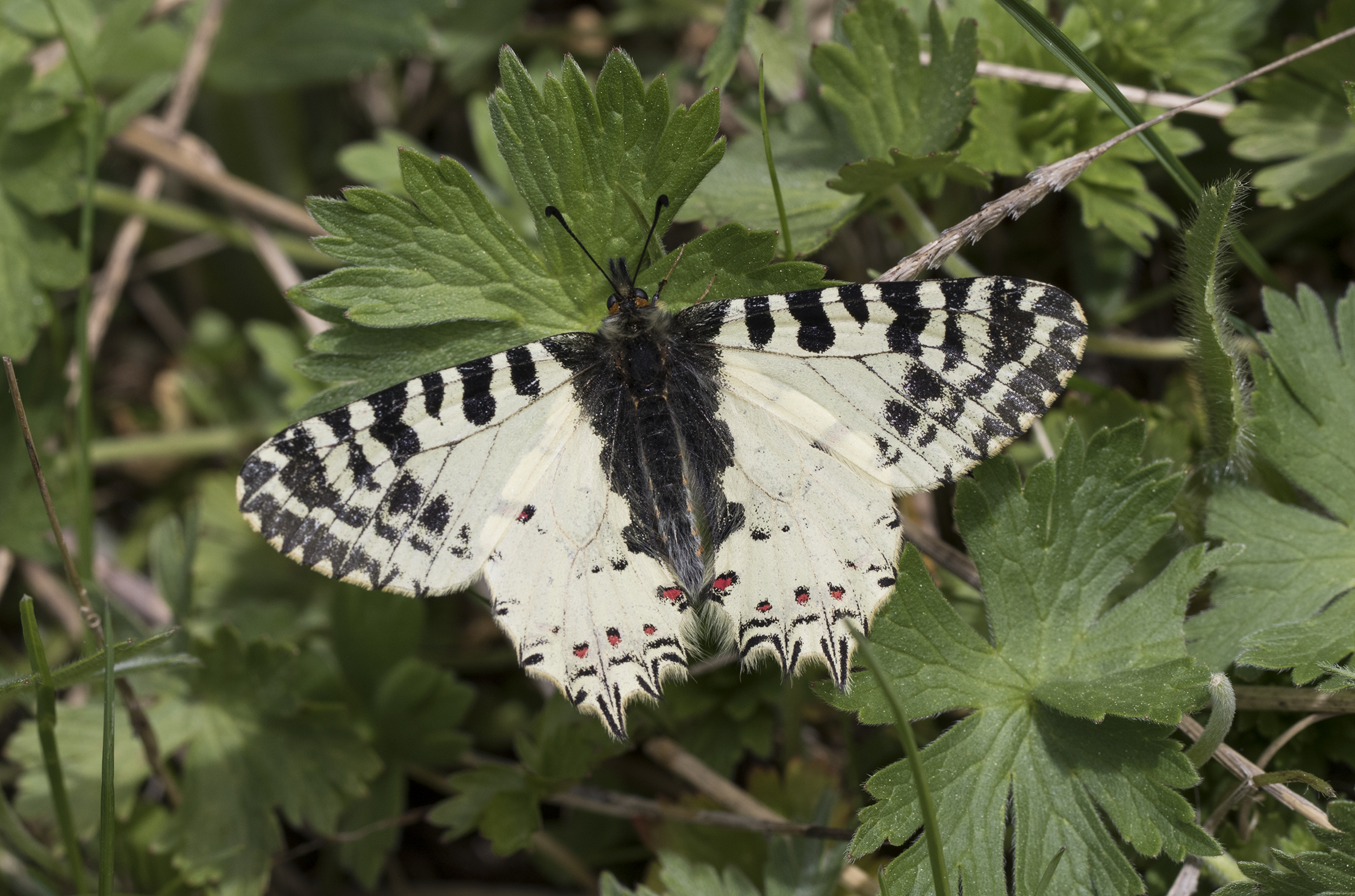

Scientific classification
- Kingdom: Animalia
- Phylum: Arthropoda
- Class: Insecta
- Order: Lepidoptera
- Family: Papilionidae
- Genus: Allancastria
- Species: A. deyrollei

Binomial name
- Allancastria deyrollei (Oberthür, 1869)

Synonyms
- Thais deyrollei Oberthür, 1869; Zerynthia deyrollei (Oberthür, 1869); Allancastria deyrolei (missp.)

= Allancastria deyrollei =

Species of butterfly

Allancastria deyrollei is a butterfly belonging to the family Papilionidae. It was described by Oberthür in 1869 as a variety then a subspecies of Allancastria cerisyi see that species for the differentiation. It is found only in western Iran, Turkey, Syria, northwestern Iraq, Lebanon, Jordan, and Israel.

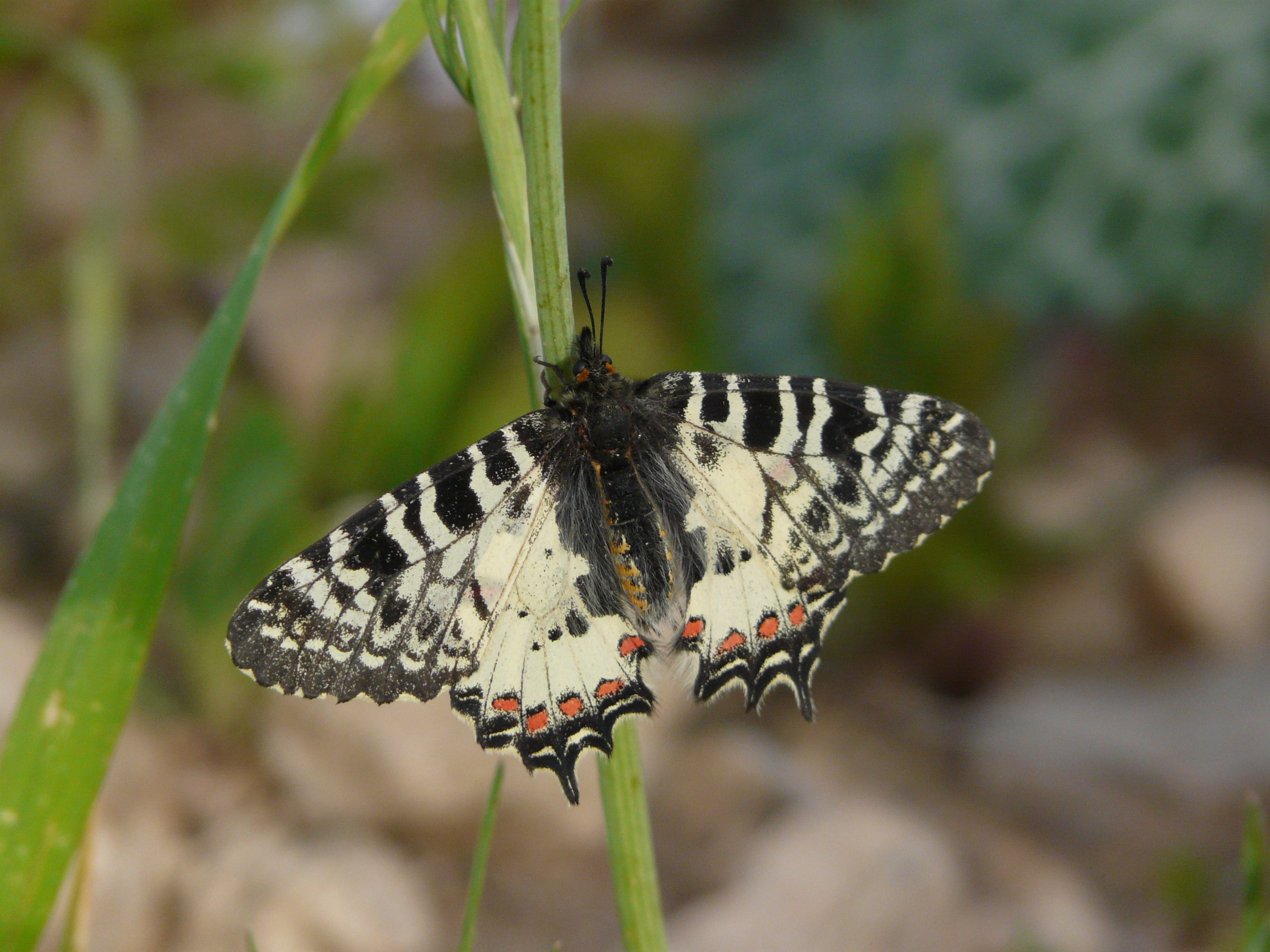
Specimen from Jordan

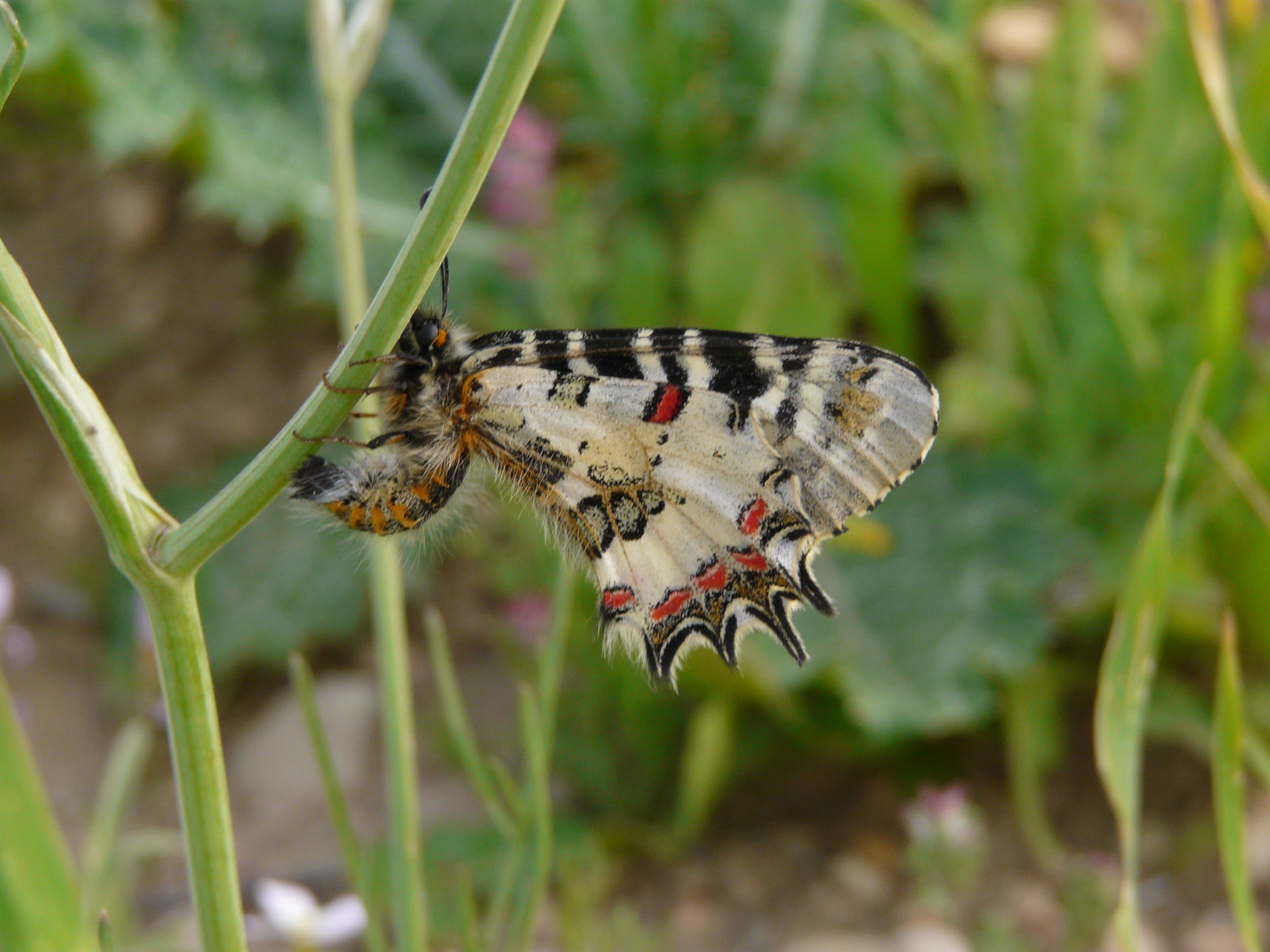
Profile
