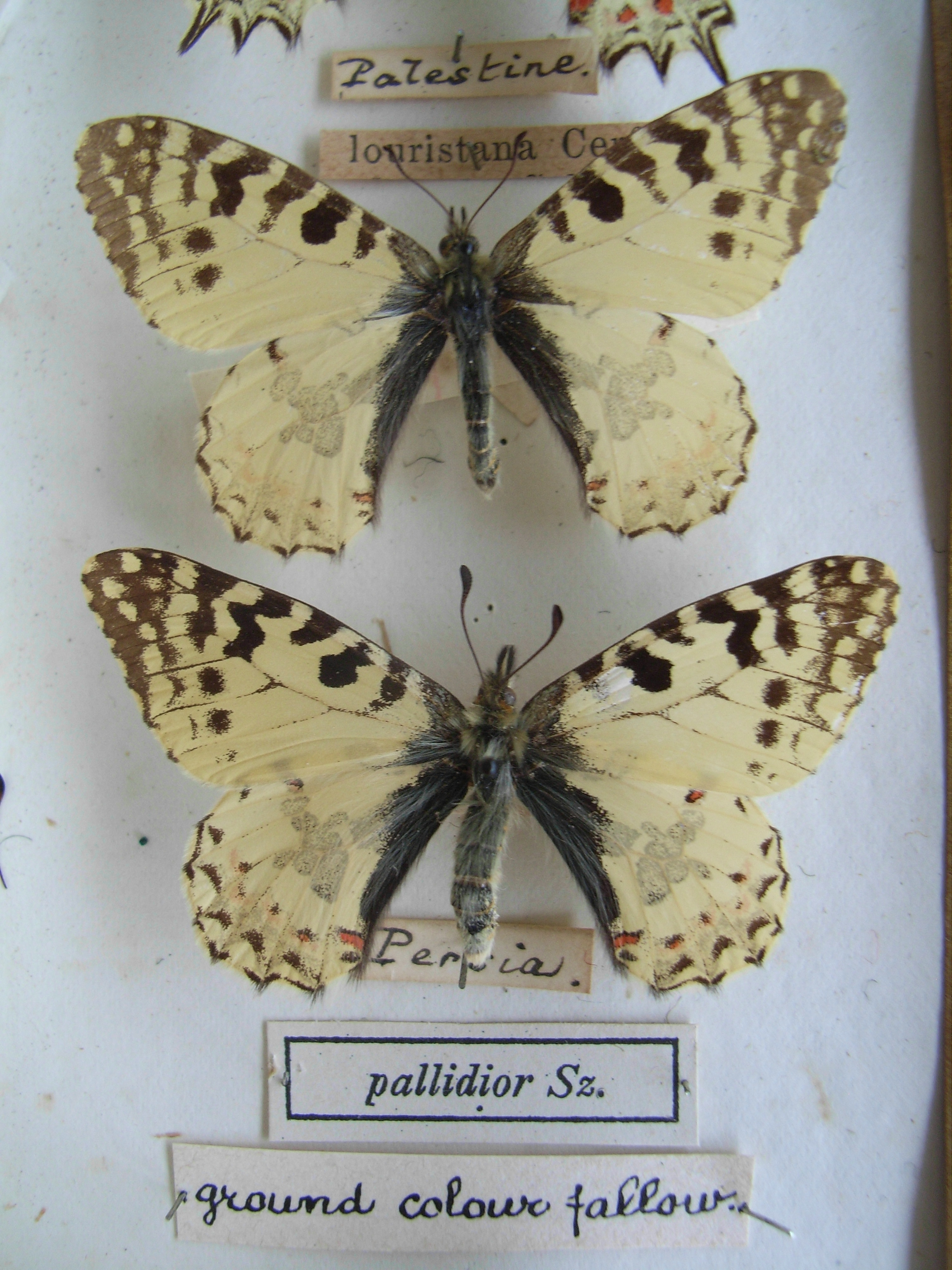
- Museum specimens. "Persia".

Scientific classification
- Kingdom: Animalia
- Phylum: Arthropoda
- Class: Insecta
- Order: Lepidoptera
- Family: Papilionidae
- Genus: Allancastria
- Species: A. louristana

Binomial name
- Allancastria louristana (Le Cerf, 1908)

= Allancastria louristana =

Species of butterfly

Allancastria louristana is a butterfly belonging to the family Papilionidae. It is found only in western Iran.
