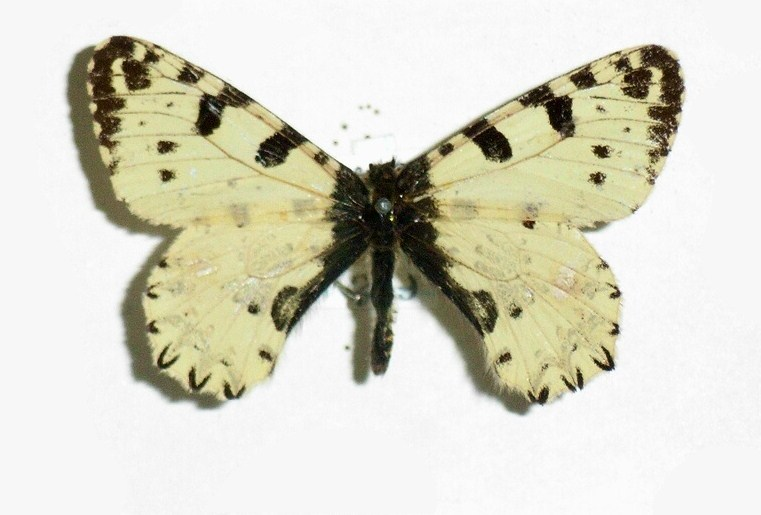
- Museum specimen. Crete.

Scientific classification
- Kingdom: Animalia
- Phylum: Arthropoda
- Clade: Pancrustacea
- Class: Insecta
- Order: Lepidoptera
- Family: Papilionidae
- Genus: Allancastria
- Species: A. cretica

Binomial name
- Allancastria cretica Rebel, 1904

= Allancastria cretica =

Species of butterfly

Allancastria cretica is a butterfly belonging to the family Papilionidae. It was described by Rebel in 1904. It is found only on the Greek island of Crete where it is, then, an endemic species. The taxon was originally described as a variation of Allancastria cerisyi, then treated as its subspecies.

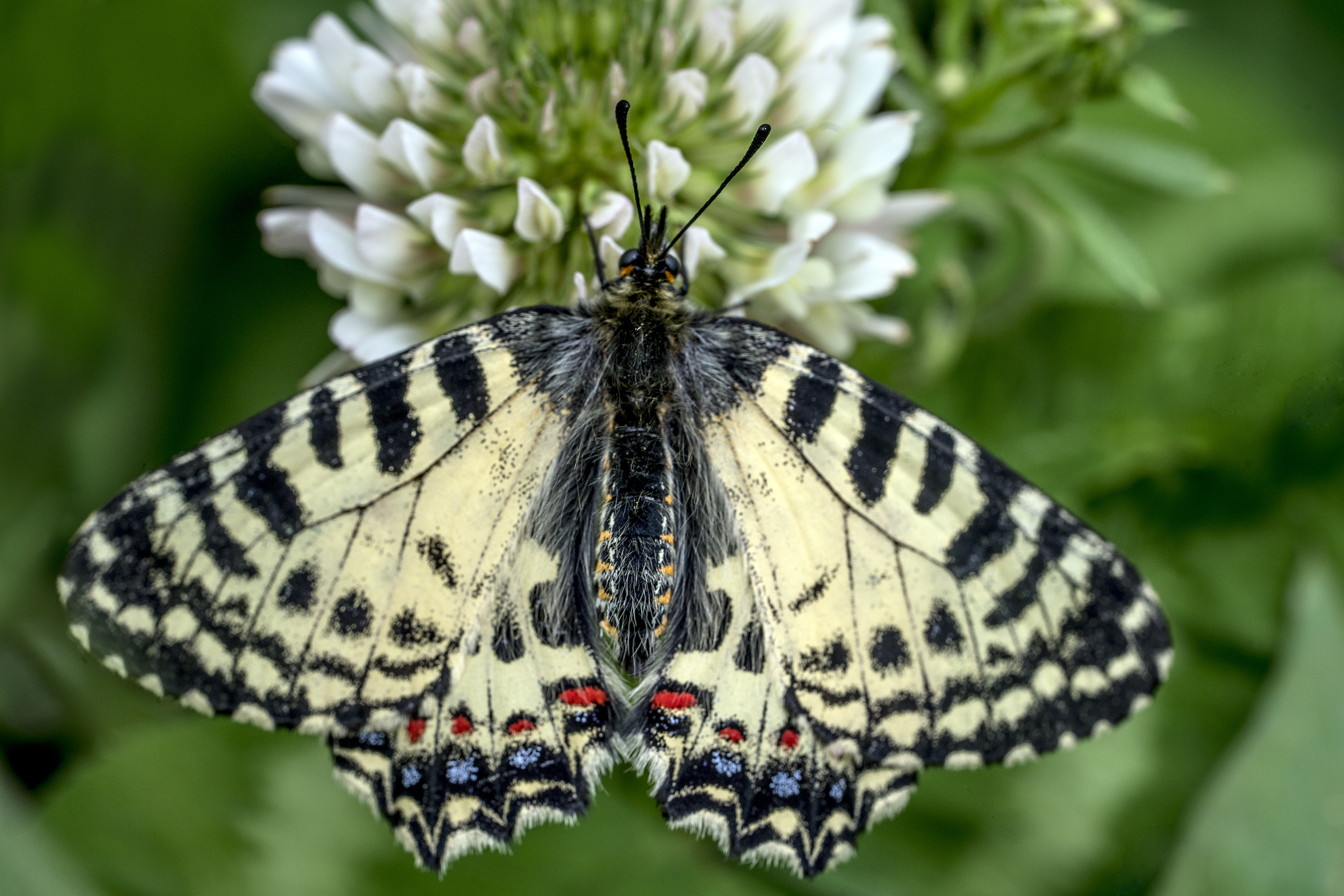
Imago Crete

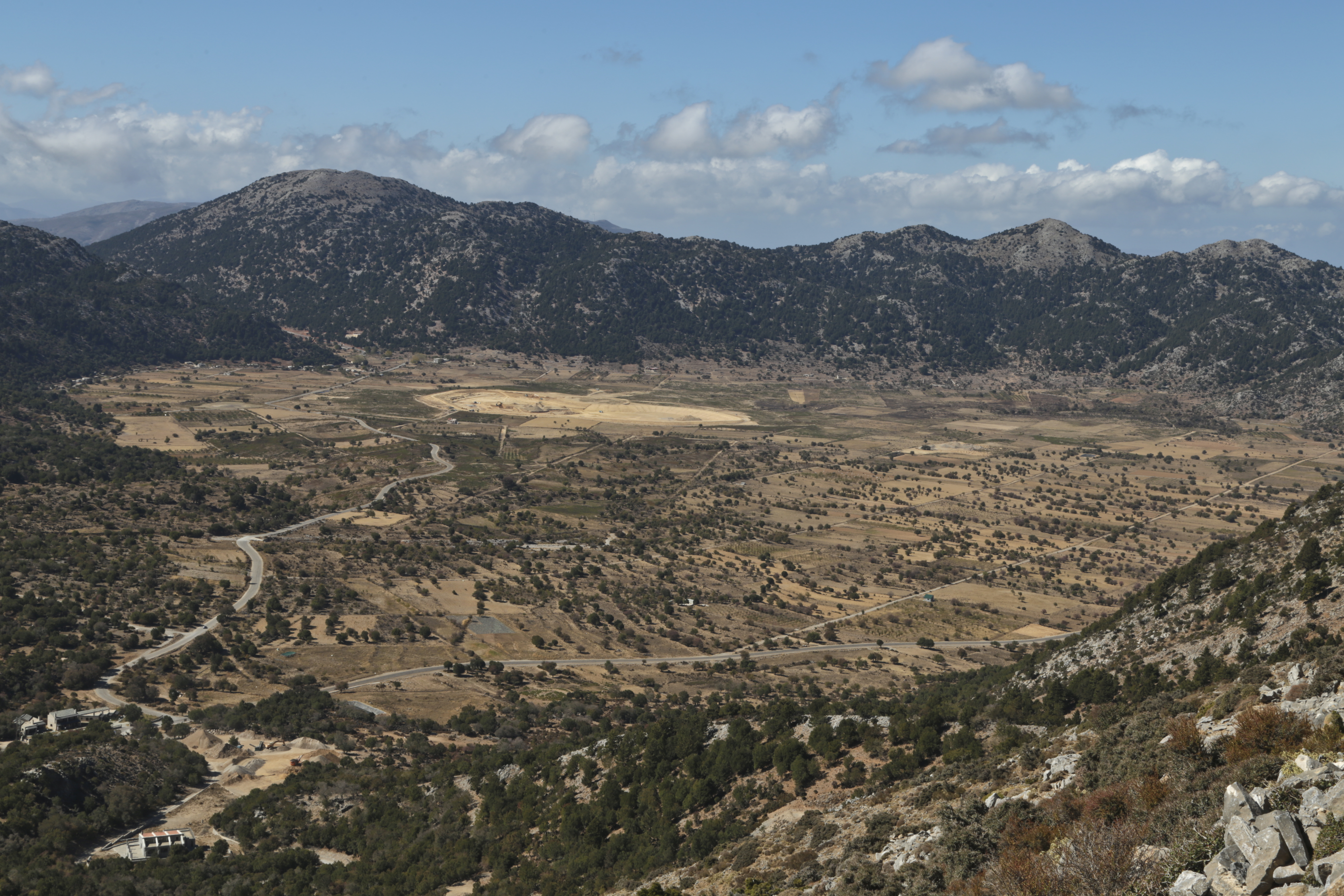
Habitat.Omalos Plateau, Crete

== Description ==
The Allancastria cretica imago is a medium-sized ( 50–60 millimetres (2.0–2.4 in) long, white to ochre-white butterfly with black markings, a line of submaginal scallops, and a few red dots on the hindwings. Seitz_-cretica Reb. (9e) occurs on Grete and some Greek islands; a sparsely marked form in which the three teeth of the hindwing mentioned above (A.cerisyi) are indicated only by black curved lines, the edge of the wing not being distinctly excised. Not so common as cerisyi.

It develops in one generation per year. Butterflies are found from March to June. In general, the flight time depends on the weather conditions and can be extended. At the beginning, males appear first, and the mass exit of females occurs 7–10 days later. For males, a search type of flight is typical, characteristic of other mountain representatives of the subfamily Parnassiinae. Females fly in search of food and food plants for laying eggs. Females after mating lay eggs one at a time, gluing them to the underside of the leaves. The larval foodplant is Aristolochia.
