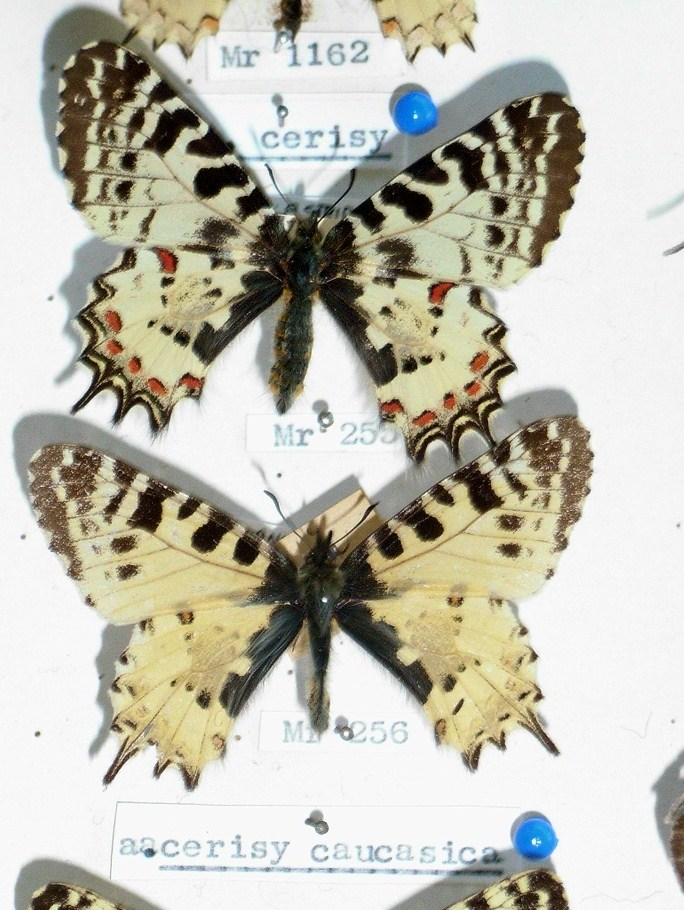
- Museum specimen.

Conservation status
- Vulnerable (IUCN 2.3)

Scientific classification
- Kingdom: Animalia
- Phylum: Arthropoda
- Clade: Pancrustacea
- Class: Insecta
- Order: Lepidoptera
- Family: Papilionidae
- Genus: Allancastria
- Species: A. caucasica

Binomial name
- Allancastria caucasica Lederer, 1864

= Allancastria caucasica =

Species of butterfly

Allancastria caucasica, sometimes referred to as Zerynthia caucasica, is an Old World papilionid butterfly whose geographical range extends from the Black Sea and southern Russia (southern Caucasus Mountains) to Georgia and northeast Turkey. It exhibits several geographical variants. Its natural habitat is temperate forests. It is threatened by habitat loss.

It feeds on Aristolochia species.

It was described as a variety then a subspecies of Allancastria cerisyi see that species for the differentiation.
