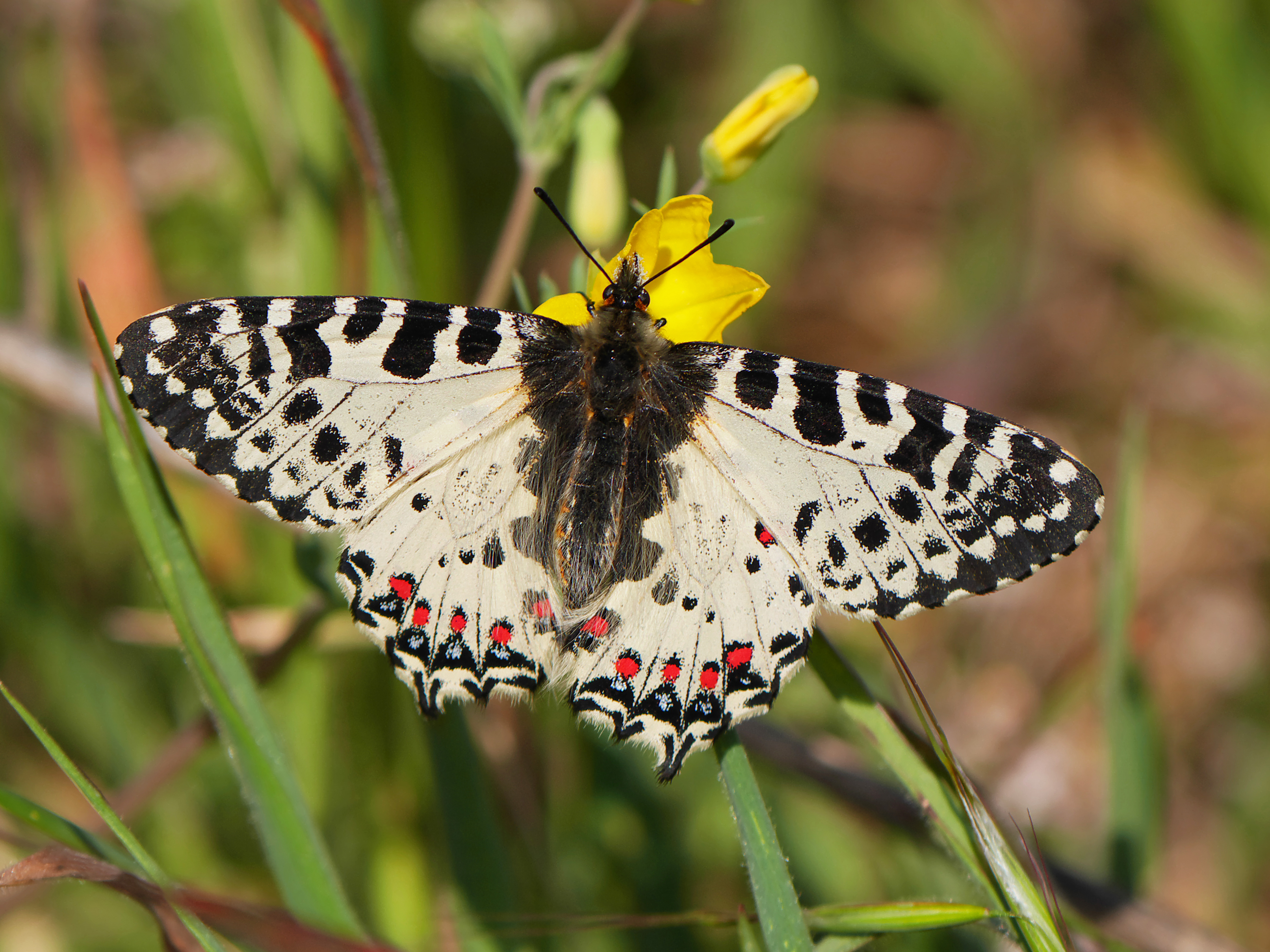

Scientific classification
- Kingdom: Animalia
- Phylum: Arthropoda
- Clade: Pancrustacea
- Class: Insecta
- Order: Lepidoptera
- Family: Papilionidae
- Genus: Allancastria
- Species: A. cerisyi

Binomial name
- Allancastria cerisyi Godart, 1824

Synonyms
- Zerynthia cerisy

= Allancastria cerisyi =

Species of butterfly

Allancastria cerisyi, the eastern festoon, is an Old World papilionid butterfly whose geographical range extends from the Balkans to include Turkey and the near Middle East. It exhibits several geographical variants.

It is named for Alexandre Louis Lefèbvre de Cérisy.

The wingspan is 52–62 millimetres (2.0–2.4 in).

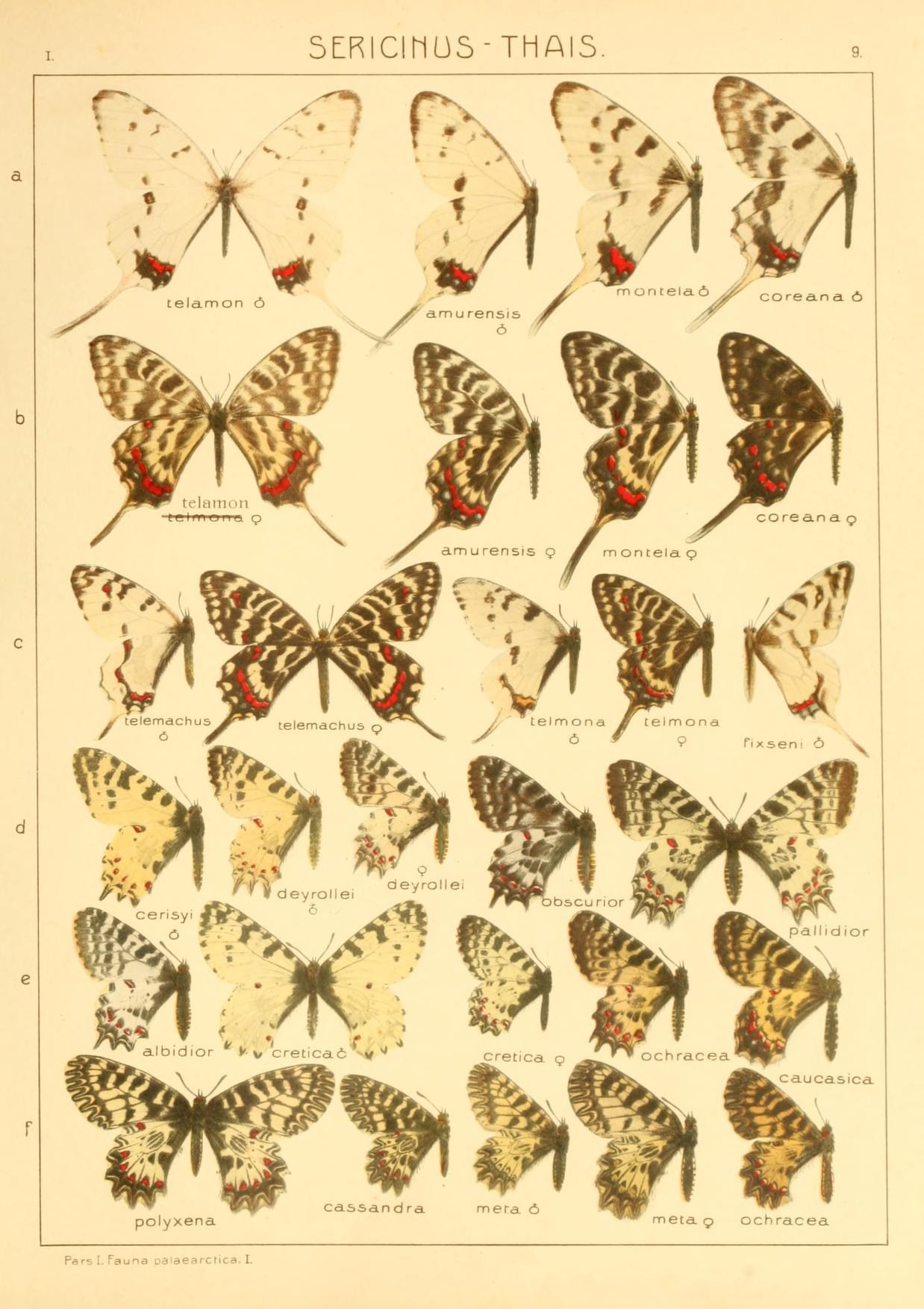
Plate 9 Seitz

== Description in Seitz ==
T. cerisyi God. (9d). Closely resembling in colour and pattern the male of Sericinus, being like this spotted with black on a pale yellow ground, the hindwing bearing traces of red near the middle of the costal margin and at the anal angle. Hindwing with only one strongly prominent tooth. Balcan States, Greece and Asia Minor; not so common as polyxena, occurring from April till early June, being still earlier in the southern districts. — The female varies very much; specimens which are very strongly spotted with black are sold by dealers as ab. obscurior (9d), in albidior (9e) the ground-colour is white, in ochracea (9e) bright yellow, and in pallidior (9d) fallow; in ab. flavomaculata Verity the carmine dots are replaced by dots of honey-colour; all these aberrations occur together with ordinary cerisyi. — caucasica Led.[now species Allancastria caucasica (9e) has in both sexes very large, broad, black costal spots on the forewing, the hindwing being sUghtly and almost evenly scalloped, the middle tooth hardly projecting; in Armenia. — deyrollei Oberth.[ now species Allancastria deyrollei] (9d) has the three teeth before the anal angle of the hindwing prolonged into short tails; in the coast districts of the Black Sea, in the whole of Asia Minor, southward to Syria; extremely common, in some places appealing in enormous numbers. — cretica Reb. (9e) [now species Allancastria cretica] occurs on Crete and some Greek islands; a sparsely marked form in which the three teeth of the hindwing mentioned above are indicated only by black curved lines, the edge of the wing not being distinctly excised. Not so common as the preceding. — Larva yellow, brown or reddish, the tubercles being red; from May till July, on Aristolochia. Pupa dust-colour or yellowish grey, variegated with thin black dashes, especially on the head. — The buttertlies are on the wing on the first warm days of the year at rocky places and the edges of woods.

== Biology ==
The butterfly flies from March to July depending on the location.

The larvae feed on various Aristolochia species.

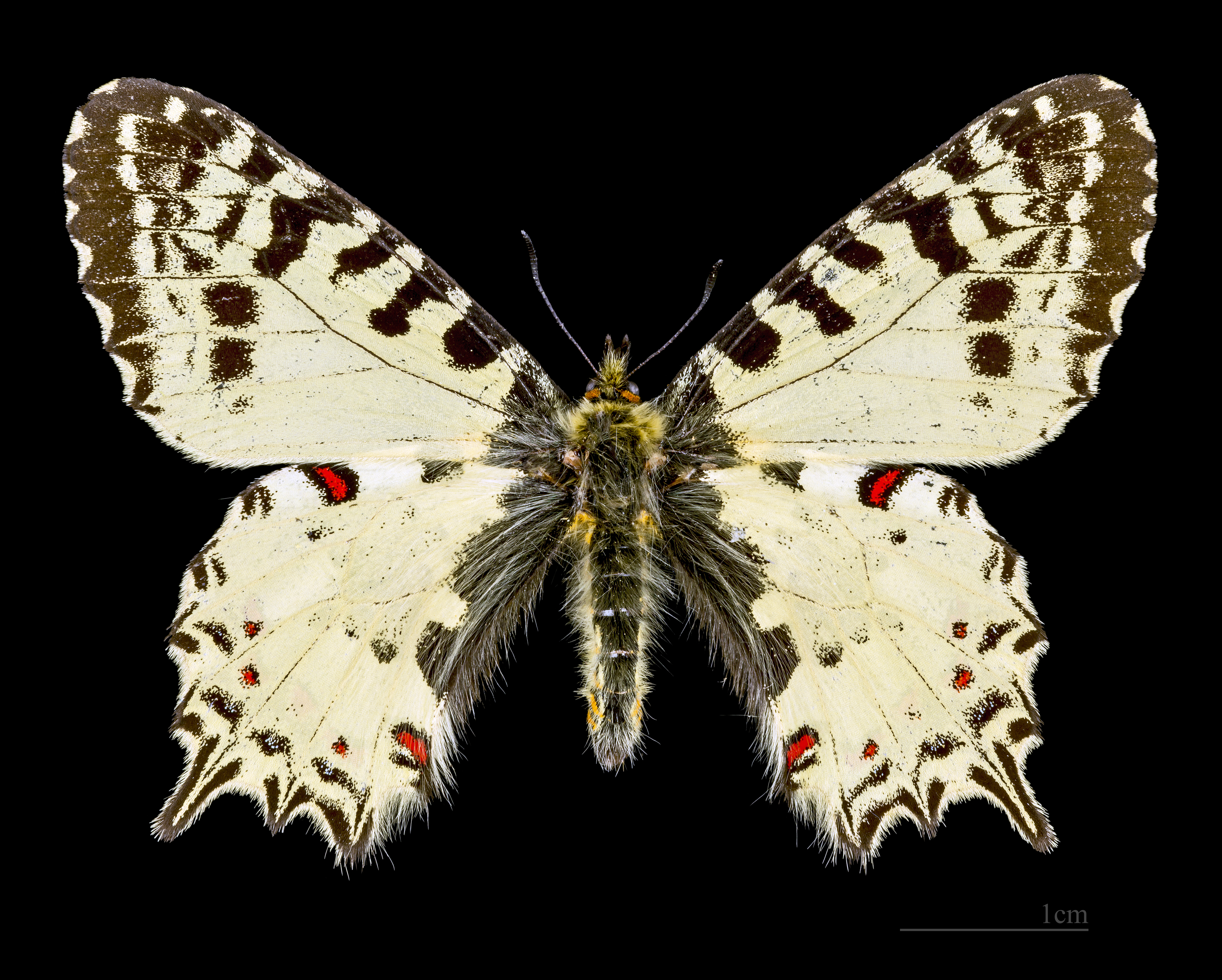
Male

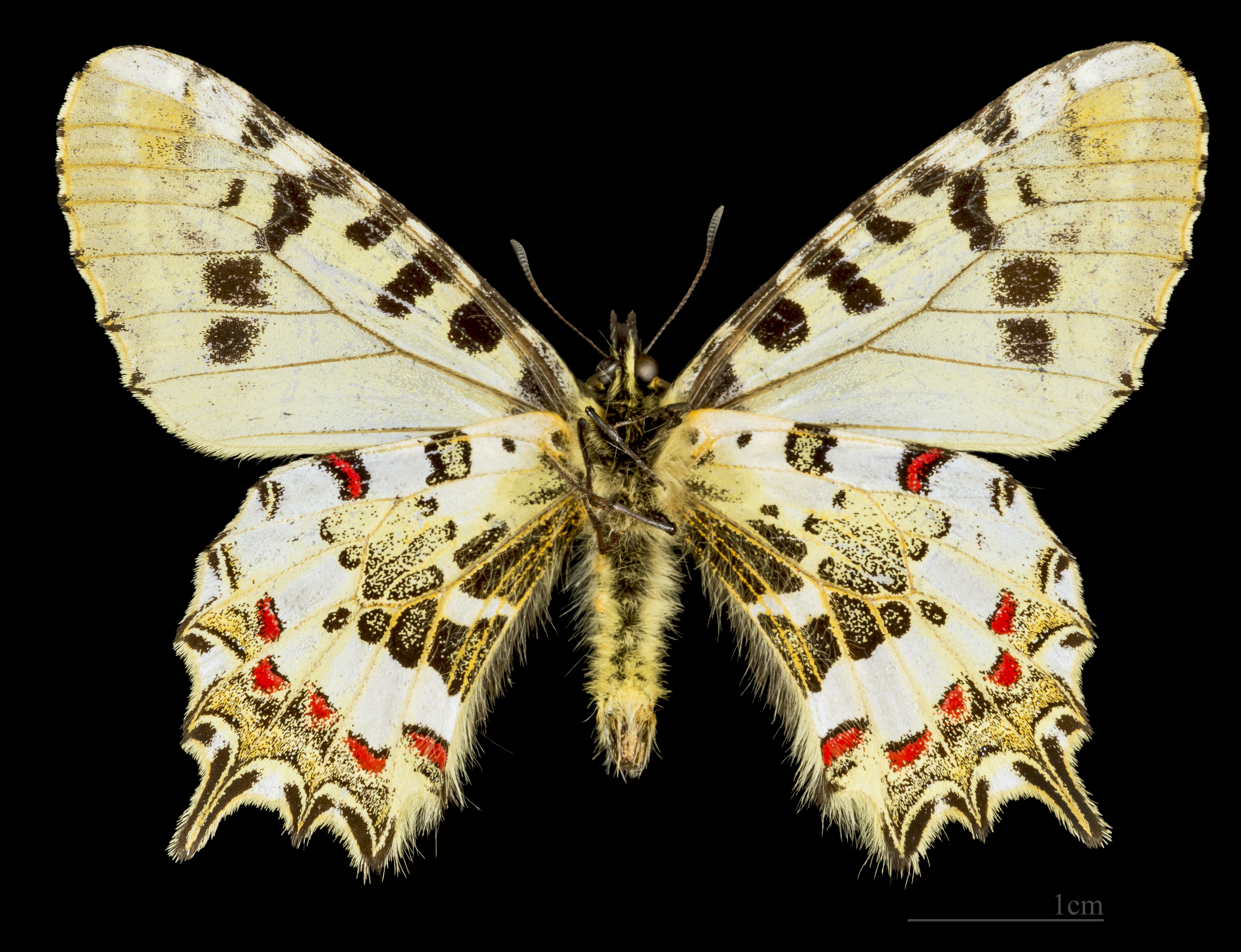
Male, bottom

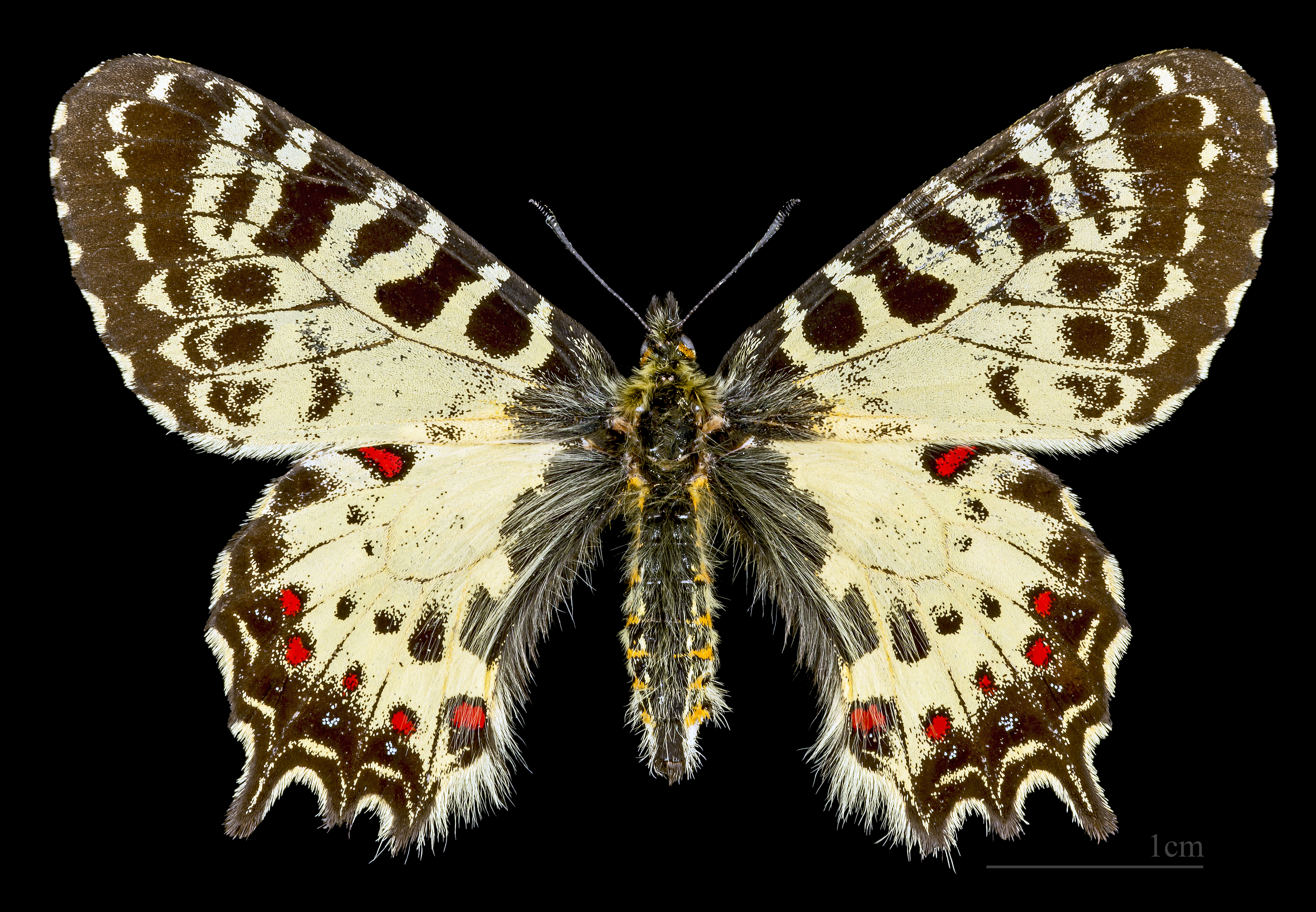
Female

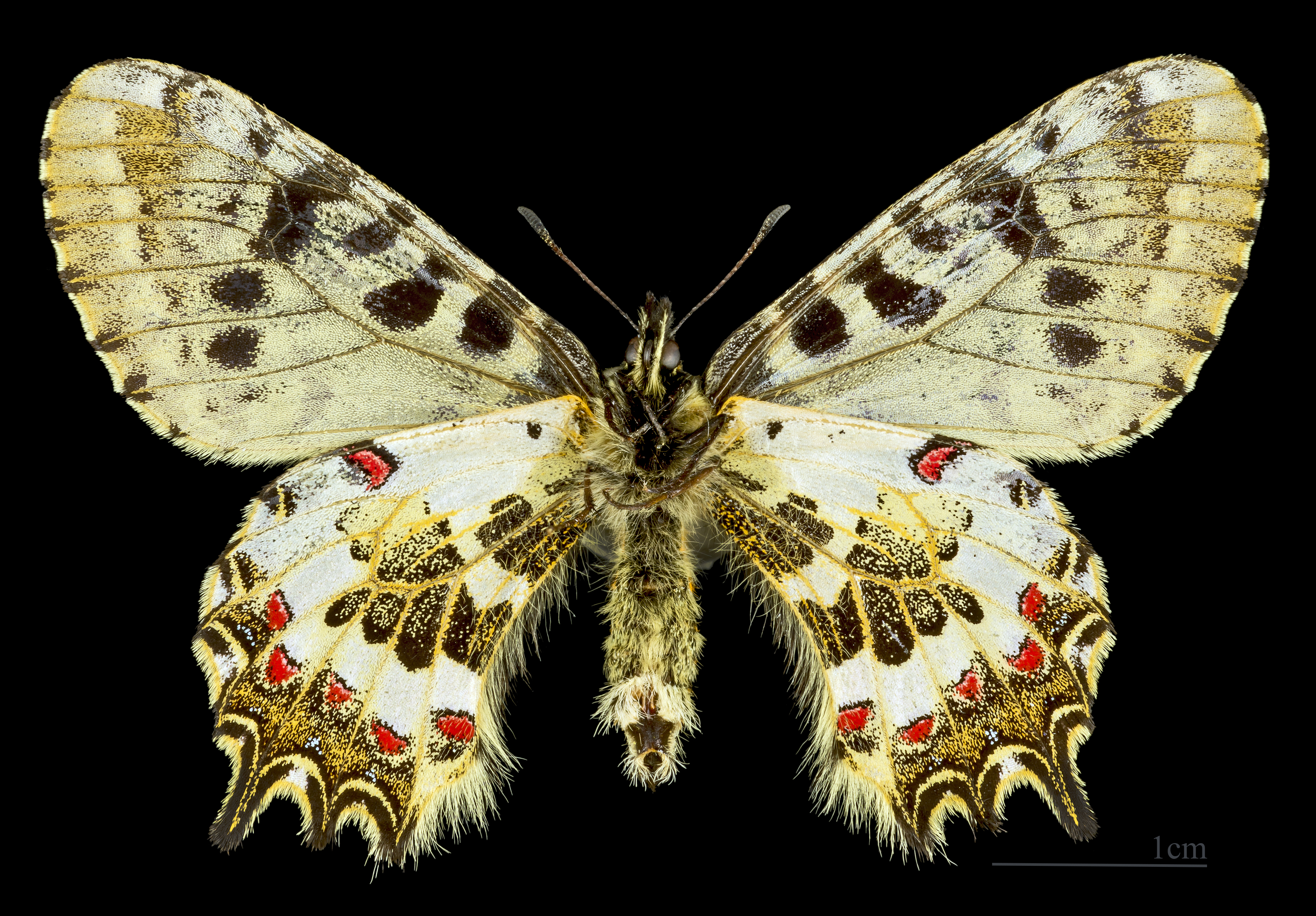
Female, bottom

== Synonymy/subspecies ==
- Thais cerisyi Godart, 1823 ["1822"]; Mém. Soc. Linn. Paris 2: 234, pl. 20, f. 3-4. [Technically, this has been argued as being unpublished, therefore taxonomic acts are unavailable]
- Thais cerisy Godart, 1824; Ency. Methodique 9: 812 [in Livraison 95, dated as "17 July 1824"]
- Allancastria cerisyi (Godart, 1824)
- Allancastria cerisyi cerisyi (Godart, 1824)
- A. c. dalmacijae Sala & Bollino, 1994 Dalmatia. Type Locality, Croatia, Dalmatia (Makarska
- A. c. ferdinandi Stichel, 1907 Albania, Bulgaria. Type locality Bulgaria
- A. c. huberi Sala & Bollino, 1994 Greece. Type locality Greece, Florina
- A. c. martini (Fruhstorfer, 1906) Soc. Ent. 21 (19): 147. Greece. Type locality Greece Rhodes; Abadjiev, 2002, Neue Ent. Nachr 23: 8.
- A. c. mihljevici Sijaric, 1990 Hercegowina. Type locality Herzegovina
- A. c. speciosa Stichel, 1907 Syria. Type locality Syria

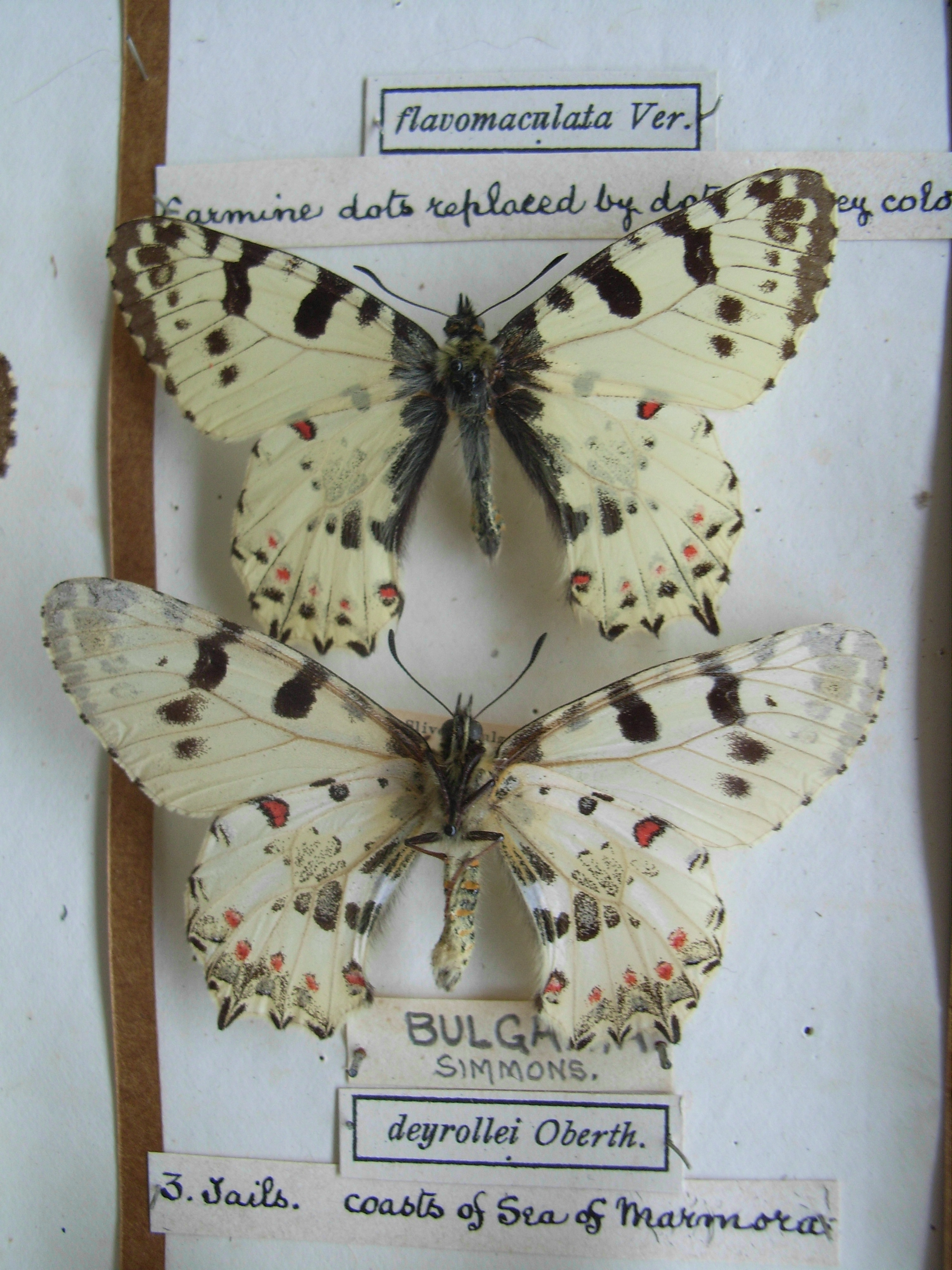
A. c. ferdinandi Stichel, 1907 var flavomaculata Verity (Top specimen upperside, Bottom specimen underside).

== Etymology ==
Named in the Classical tradition In Greek mythology, Polyxena is the youngest daughter of King Priam of Troy and his queen, Hecuba

== Literature ==
- Abadjiev, 2002 Types of Balkan butterflies in the collection of The Natural History Museum, London Neue Ent. Nachr. 23: 3-53
- Fruhstorfer, 1906 Eine neue Thais von Rhodos Soc. Ent. 21 (19): 147-148
- Sala & Bollino, 1994 Allancastria cerisyi Godart, 1922 in the Balkans: News subspecies and critical notes on the existing populations Atalanta 25 (1/2): 151-160
- Sijaric, 1990 Taxonomska istrazivania i nove podvrste vrsta roda Zerynthia ne nekim podrucijima Jugoslavije Glasn. zemelj. Mus. Bosni Herceg. (n.s.) 28 (1989): 177-208
- Stichel, 1907 Neue Unterarten von Zerynthia cerisyi God. Ent. Z. 21: 177–178
