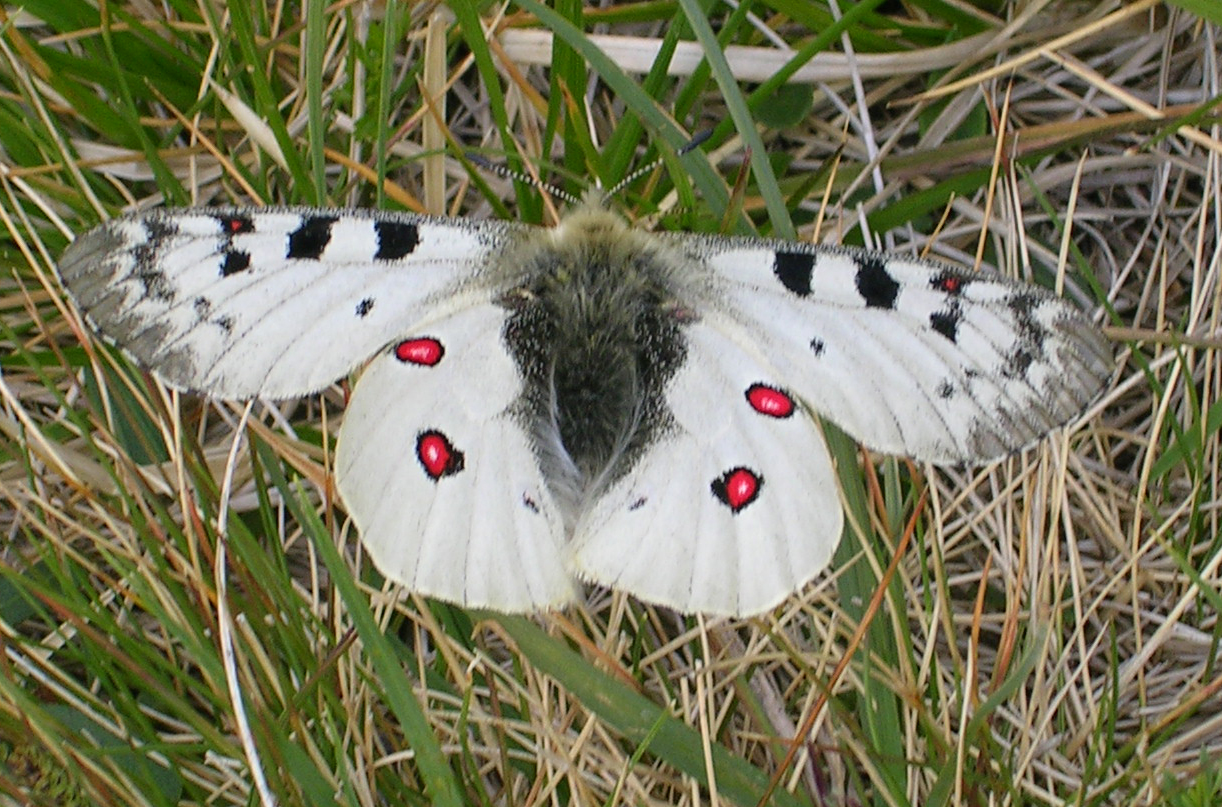
- Small Apollo (Parnassius phoebus)

Scientific classification
- Kingdom: Animalia
- Phylum: Arthropoda
- Class: Insecta
- Order: Lepidoptera
- Family: Papilionidae
- Subfamily: Parnassiinae

Tribes
- See text

= Parnassiinae =

Subfamily of butterflies

The Parnassiinae or snow Apollos are a subfamily of the swallowtail butterfly family, Papilionidae. The subfamily includes about 50 medium-sized, white or yellow species. The snow Apollos are high-altitude butterflies and are distributed across Asia, Europe and North America.

== Tribes ==
- Parnassinae
  - Parnassiini
    - Hypermnestra
    - Parnassius
  - Luehdorfiini
    - - Archon
      - Doritites bosniackii
    - Luehdorfia
  - Zerythiini
    - Sericinus
    - - Bhutanitis
      - - Zerynthia
        - Allancastria
  - ? Thaites

A proposed phylogeny of the Parnassius and related groups.

This subfamily consists of the following tribes:

- Luehdorfiini
- Parnassiini
- Zerynthiini

== Gallery ==
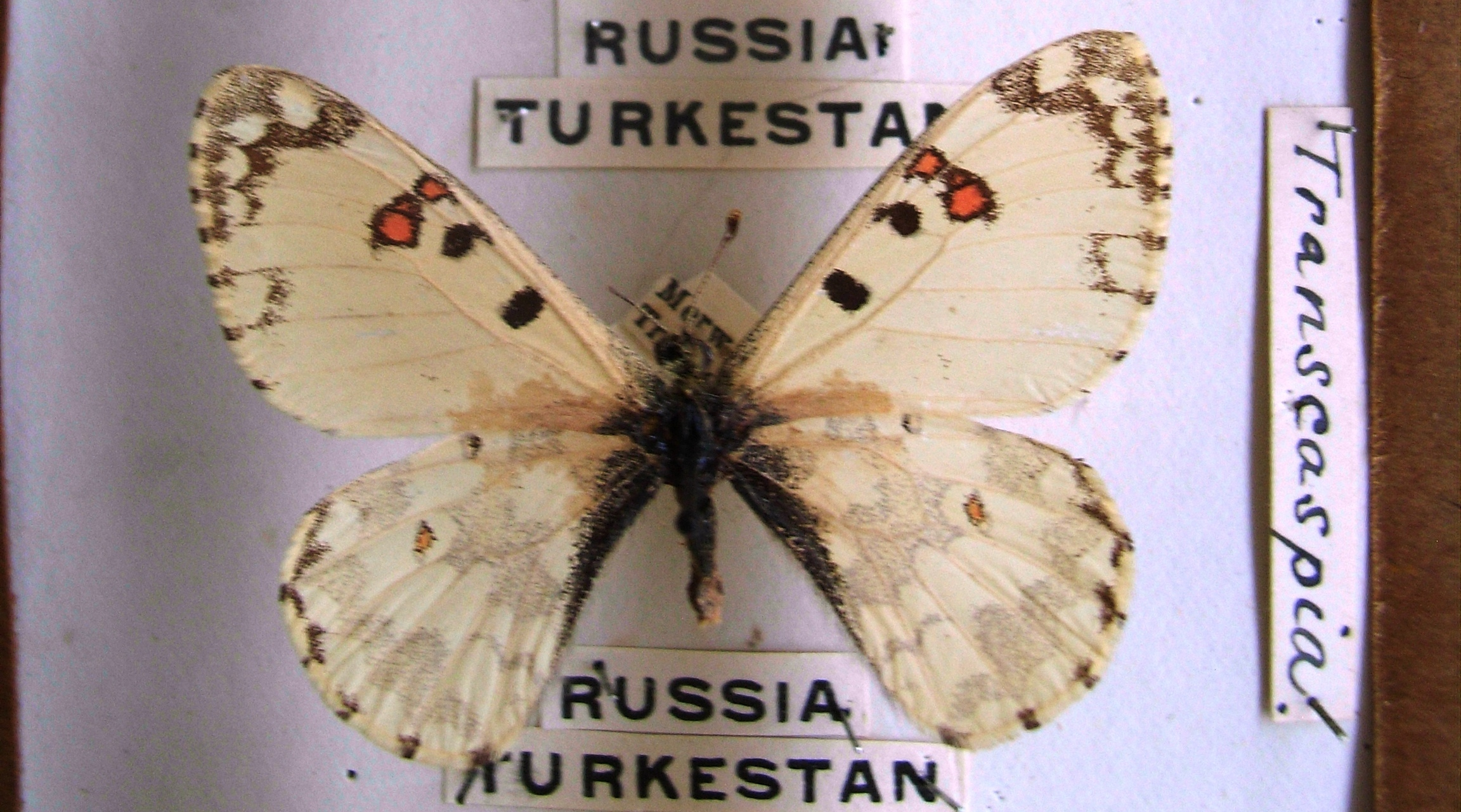
Hypermnestra helios
tribe Parnassiini

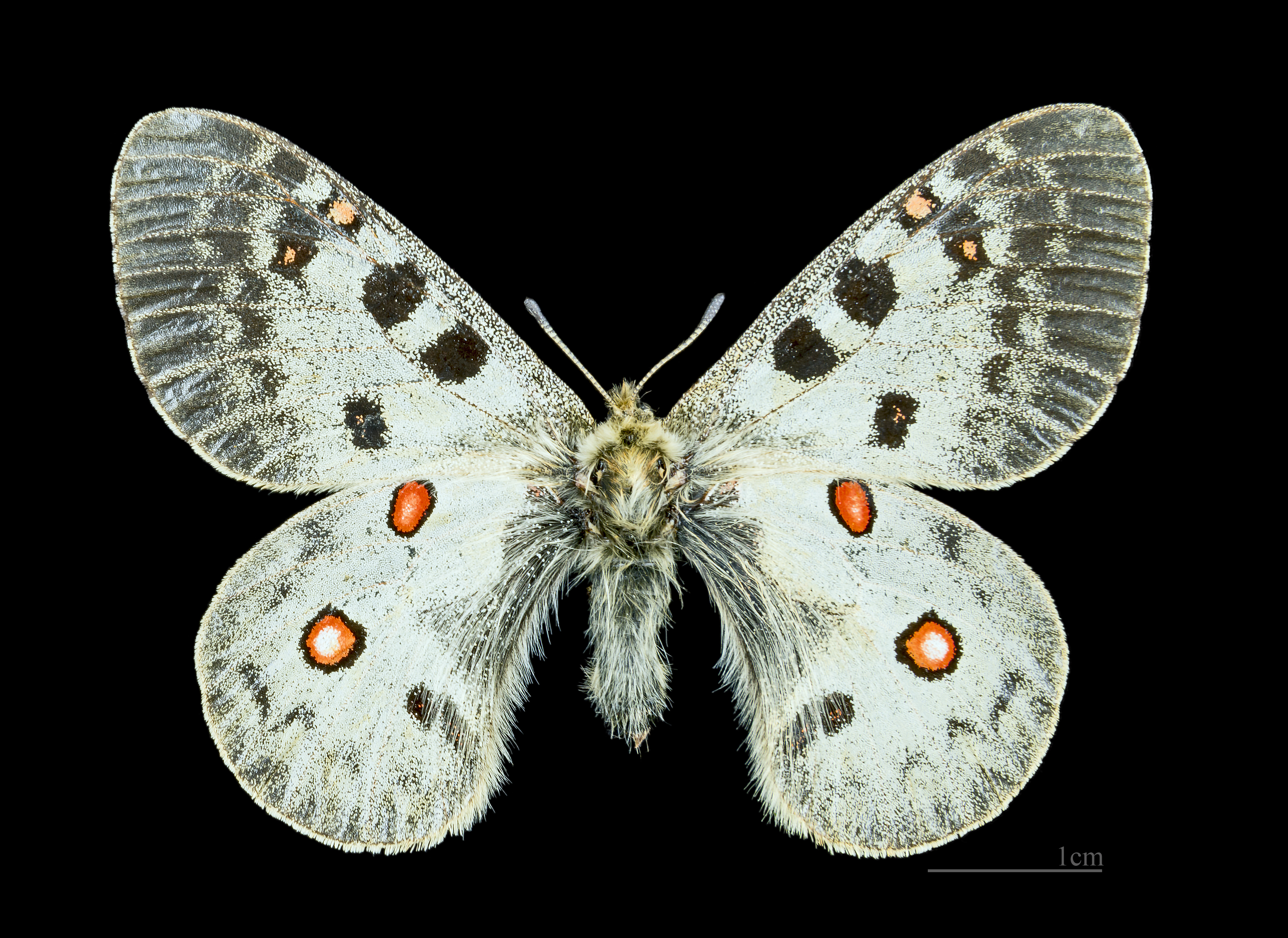
Mountain Apollo
(Parnassius apollo)
tribe Parnassiini

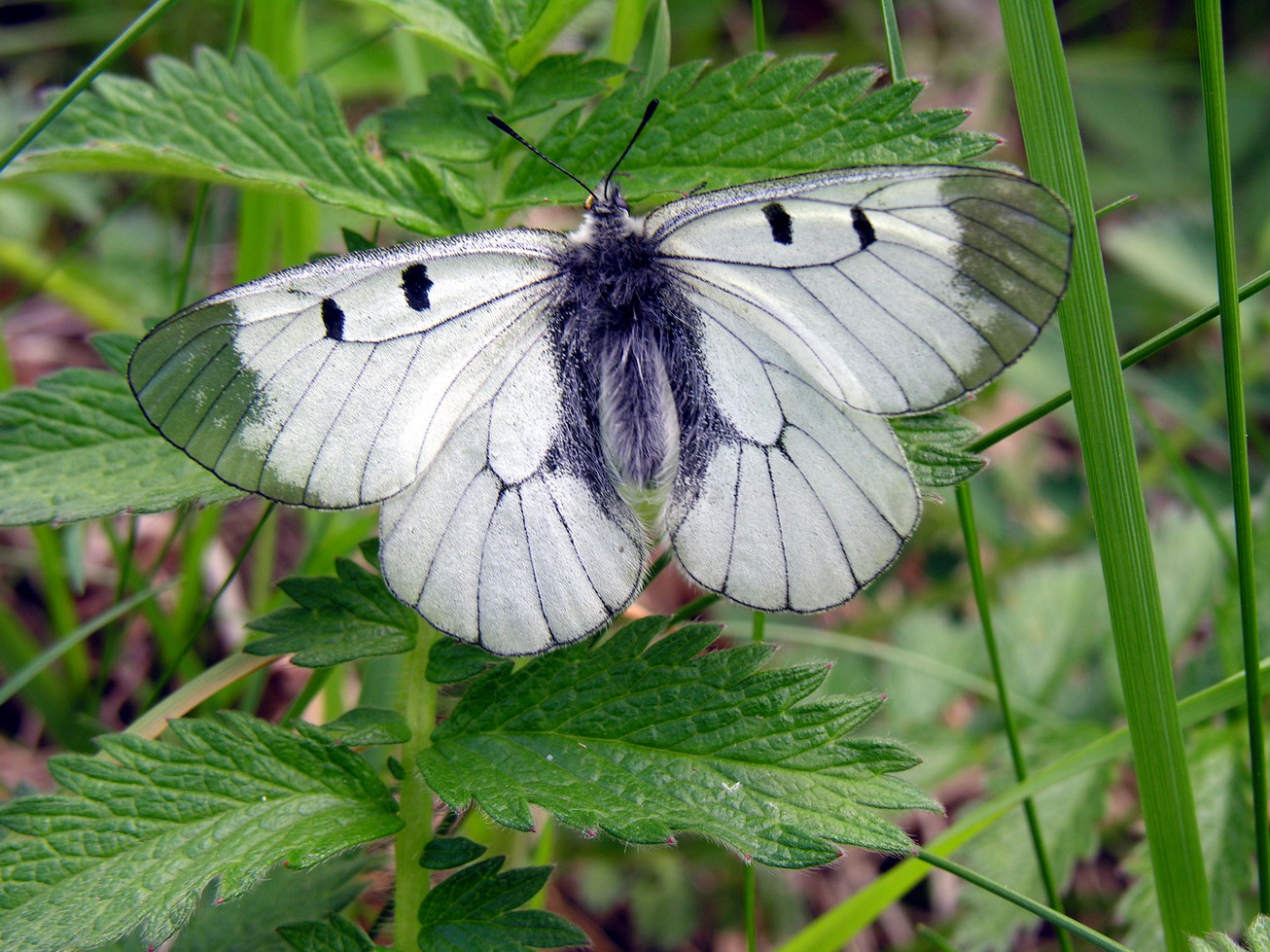
Clouded Apollo
(Parnassius mnemosyne)
tribe Parnassiini

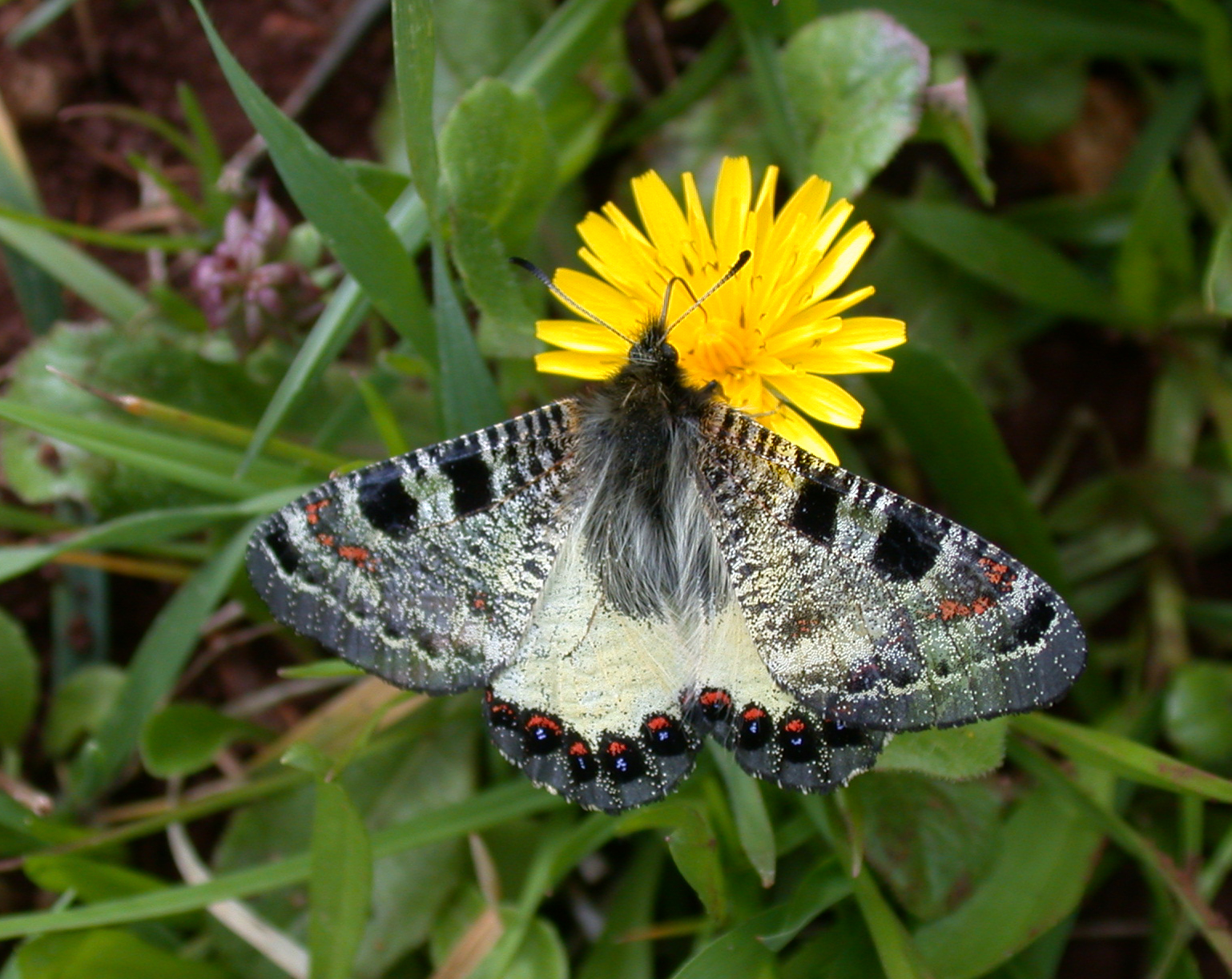
False Apollo
(Archon apollinus)
tribe Luehdorfiini

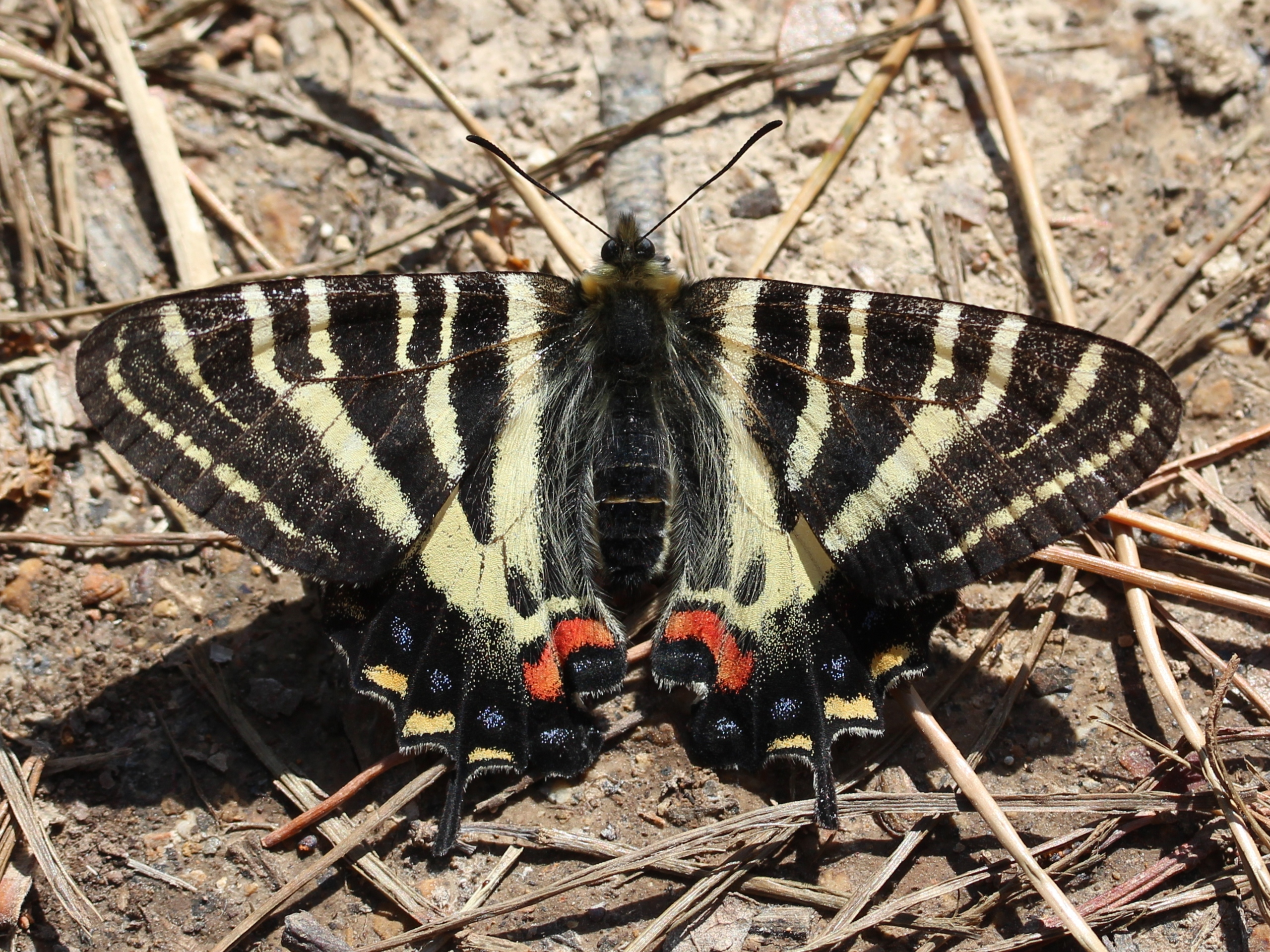
Japanese luehdorfia
(Luehdorfia japonica)
tribe Luehdorfiini

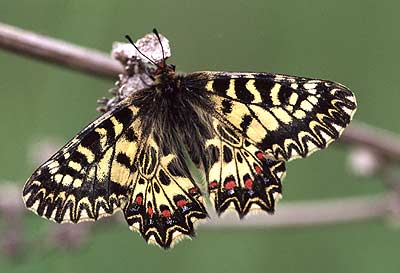
Southern festoon
(Zerynthia polyxena)
tribe Zerythiini

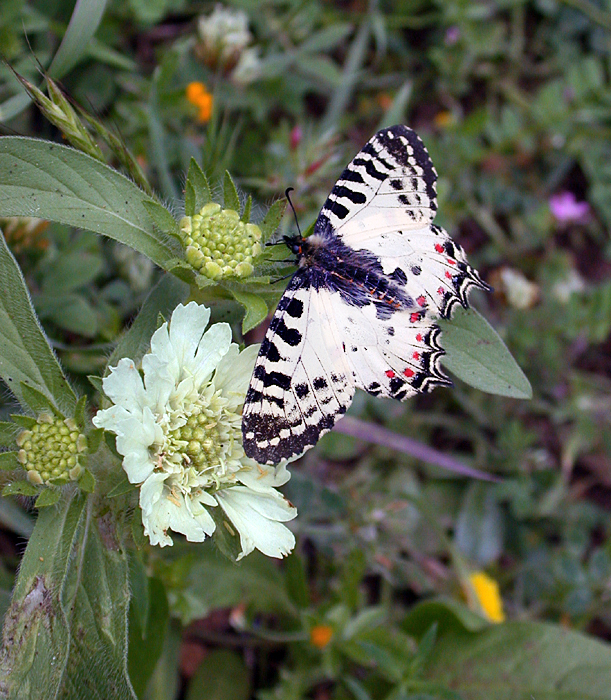
Eastern festoon
(Allancastria cerisyi)
tribe Zerythiini

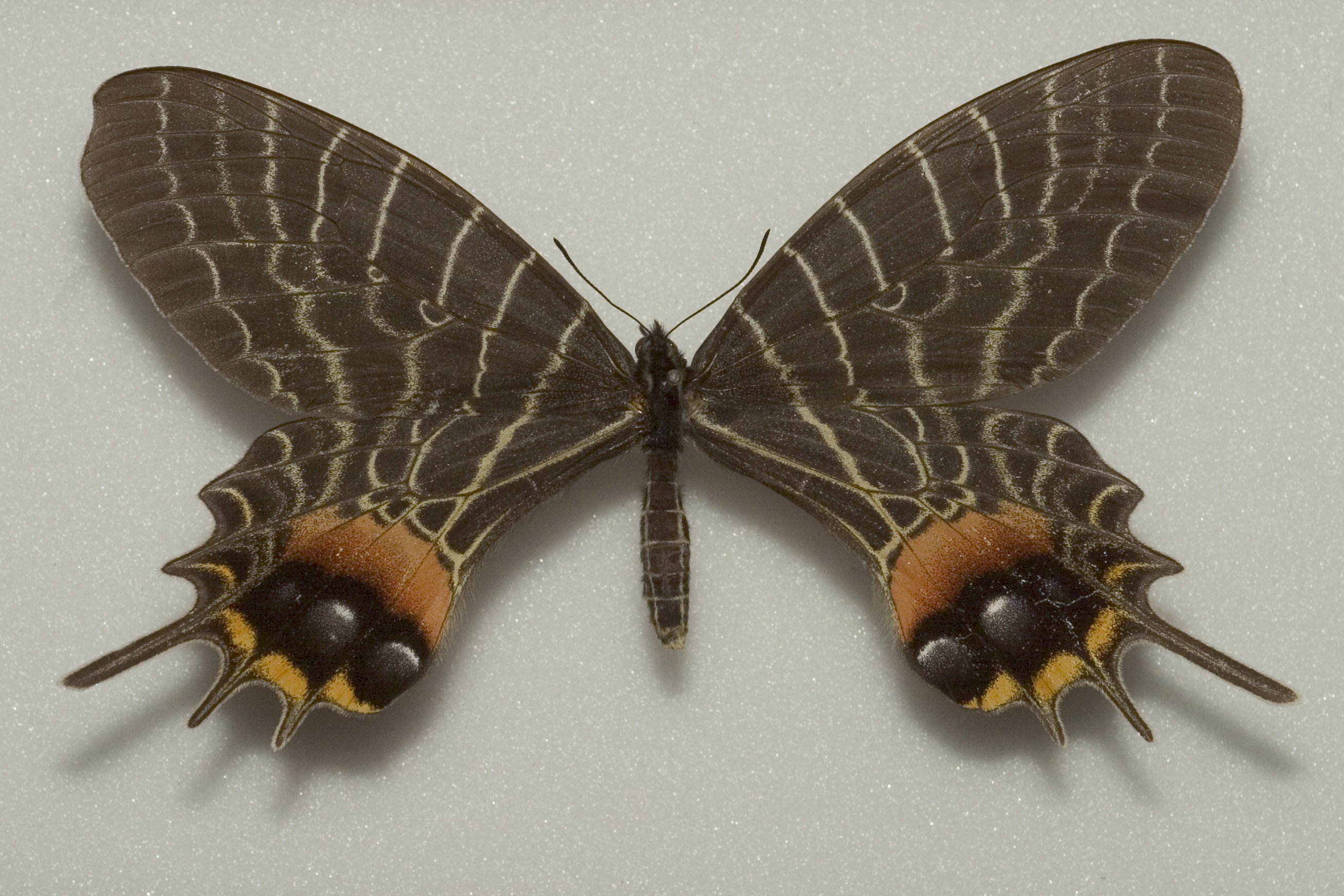
Bhutan glory
(Bhutanitis lidderdalii)
tribe Zerythiini
