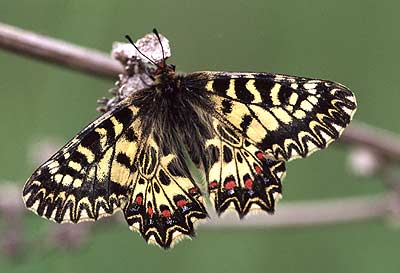
- Zerynthia polyxena

Scientific classification
- Kingdom: Animalia
- Phylum: Arthropoda
- Class: Insecta
- Order: Lepidoptera
- Family: Papilionidae
- Subfamily: Parnassiinae
- Tribe: Zerynthiini; Grote, 1899

Genera
- See text

Synonyms
- Luehdorfiini

= Zerynthiini =

Tribe of butterflies

The Zerynthiini are a tribe of swallowtail butterflies.

== Genera ==
The tribe is thought to consist of four genera:

- Allancastria
- Bhutanitis
- Sericinus
- Zerynthia
