= Felix Bryk =

Austrian-Swedish entomologist and anthropologist (1882–1957)

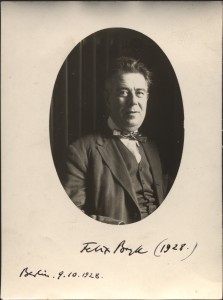
Felix Bryk in 1928

Felix Bryk (21 January 1882, in Vienna – 13 January 1957, in Stockholm) was a Swedish anthropologist, entomologist and writer. In entomological circles, Bryk is best known as a lepidopterist; in anthropological history, for his studies in East Africa. He wrote on Carl Linnaeus and was a close friend of Curt Eisner, who worked with him on the Parnassinae.

== Books by Bryk ==
Anthropology

- 1934. Circumcision in Man and Woman: Its History, Psychology and Ethnology. New York: American Ethnological Press.
- 1939. Dark Rapture: The Sex-life of The African Negro. Walden Publications.
- 1964. Voodoo-eros: Ethnological Studies In The Sex Life Of The African Aborigines. New York: United Book Guild.
- 1951. Linnée als Sexuallist.

Entomology

- 1934. Lepidoptera. Baroniidae, Teinopalpidae, Parnassiidae pars I (Subfam. Parnassinae). Das Tierreich 64, Berlin & Leipzig.
- 1935. Lepidoptera. Parnassiidae pars II (Subfam. Parnassinae). Das Tierreich 65, Berlin & Leipzig.
- 1984. Lepidoptera. Parnassiidae pars II (Subfam. Parnassinae), 2nd ed. Berlin & Leipzig, LI.
