= Hypermnestra (disambiguation) =

Hypermnestra is a daughter of Danaus and ancestor of the Danaids in Greek mythology.

Hypermnestra may also refer to:

- Hypermnestra (daughter of Thestius), daughter of Thestius and Eurythemis
- Mestra, daughter of Erysichthon

== See also ==
- Hypermnestra helios, a swallowtail butterfly
