= Baronio =

Baronio is an Italian surname. Notable people with the surname include:

- Cesare Baronio (1538–1607), Italian cardinal and ecclesiastical historian
- Roberto Baronio (born 1977), Italian footballer and manager

== See also ==
- Baronia
