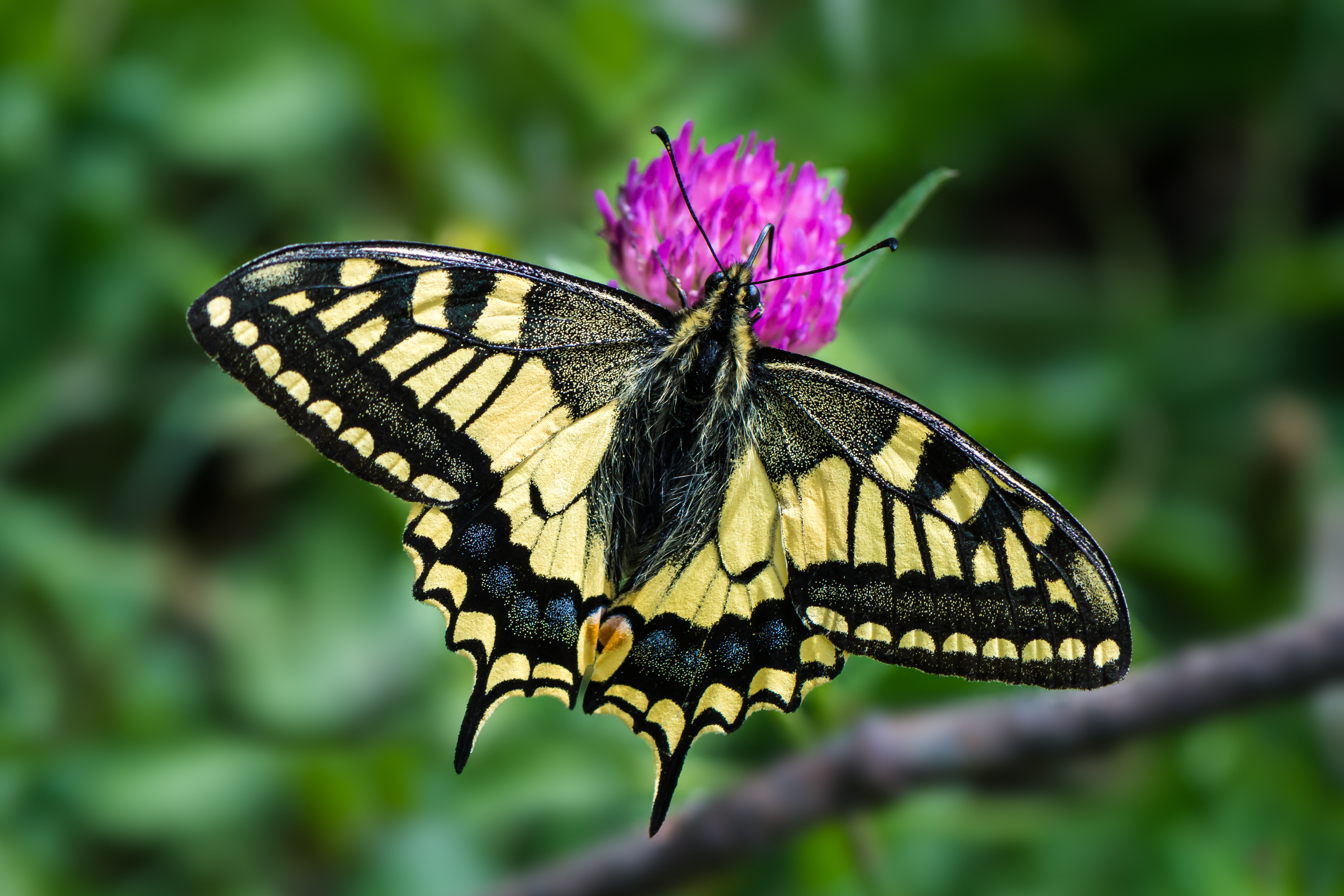
- Papilio machaon

Scientific classification
- Kingdom: Animalia
- Phylum: Arthropoda
- Clade: Pancrustacea
- Class: Insecta
- Order: Lepidoptera
- Superfamily: Papilionoidea
- Family: Papilionidae; Latreille, [1802]

Type genus
- Papilio Linnaeus, 1758

Subfamilies and genera
- There are 31 genera and about 600 species: Subfamily Baroniinae; Baronia; Subfamily Parnassiinae; Allancastria; Archon; Bhutanitis; †Doritites; Hypermnestra; Luehdorfia; Parnassius; Sericinus; Subfamily Papilioninae; Atrophaneura; Battus; Byasa; Cressida; Euryades; Eurytides; Graphium; Iphiclides; Lamproptera; Losaria; Meandrusa; Mimoides; Ornithoptera; Pachliopta; Papilio; Parides; Pharmacophagus; Protesilaus; Protographium; Teinopalpus; Trogonoptera; Troides; Subfamily †Praepapilioninae; †Praepapilio

= Swallowtail butterfly =

Butterflies of family Papilionidae

Swallowtail butterfly

A European paper wasp interacts with an anise swallowtail caterpillar which uses its osmeterium in defense. Most scenes are repeated in closeup at one-fourth speed.

A spotted towhee finds an anise swallowtail caterpillar to return to its nest and feed to its young.

Swallowtail butterflies are large, colorful butterflies in the family Papilionidae, and include over 550 species. Though the majority are tropical, members of the family inhabit every continent except Antarctica. The family includes the largest butterflies in the world, the birdwing butterflies of the genus Ornithoptera.

Swallowtails have a number of distinctive features; for example, the papilionid caterpillar bears a repugnatorial organ called the osmeterium on its prothorax. The osmeterium normally remains hidden, but when threatened, the larva turns it outward through a transverse dorsal groove by inflating it with fluid.

The forked appearance in some of the swallowtails' hindwings, which can be seen when the butterfly is resting with its wings spread, gave rise to the common name "swallowtail". As for its formal name, Linnaeus chose Papilio for the type genus, as papilio is Latin for "butterfly". For the specific epithets of the genus, Linnaeus applied the names of Greek figures to the swallowtails. The type species: Papilio machaon honored Machaon, one of the sons of Asclepius, mentioned in the Iliad. Further, the species Papilio homerus is named after the Greek poet, Homer.

The mon of the Taira clan of Japan is an agehachō (swallowtail butterfly).

== Taxonomy ==
=== Subfamilies ===
The genera of extant swallowtails are usually classified into three subfamilies, Baroniinae, Parnassiinae, and Papilioninae, the latter two being further divided into tribes. In swallowtails, besides morphological characteristics, the choice of food plants and ecological lifestyles reflect phylogeny and classification.

==== Baroniinae ====
Baroniinae is a monotypic subfamily, restricted to a very small region in Mexico and are considered to be the most basal of the subfamilies. Baronia brevicornis is considered to be a relict species, and it shares features with a fossil taxon Praepapilio. Baronia is unique among Papilionidae as having a Vachellia species (family Fabaceae) as its food plant.

Subfamily: Baroniinae

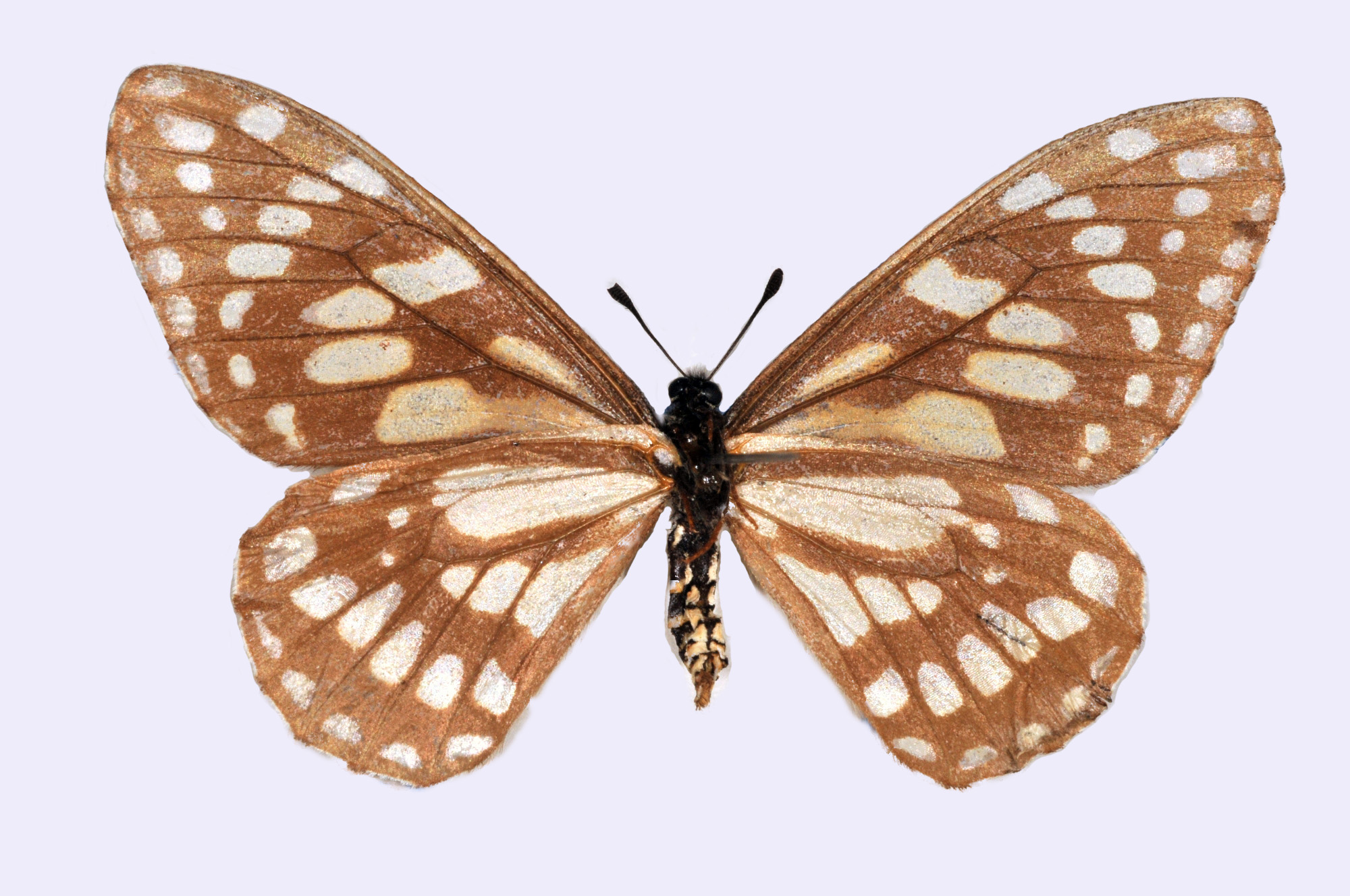
Short-horned baronia
(Baronia brevicornis)

==== Parnassiinae ====
Parnassiinae is a subfamily of essentially Holarctic butterflies. The vast majority of species, mostly Parnassius, can be found in mountain habitats. Parnassiines can also be found in other habitats such as "arid deserts (Hypermnestra), humid forests (Luehdorfia) and even lowland meadows (Zerynthia)". The tribes recognized in Parnassiinae are Parnassiini, Zerynthiini, and Luehdorfiini.

Tribe Parnassiini contains two genera, Hypermnestra, largely confined to central Asia and Parnassius (the Apollos), a distinctive group of many species, all of which are alpine and capable of living at high altitudes. Most Parnassius species have two small, reddish spots on their hindwings. The tribe Luehdorfiini contains the genera Archon of Asia Minor and the genus Luehdorfia of China and Japan. These two tribes have evolved to change their food plants, while the third tribe, Zerynthiini, has retained the archetypical papilionid food plant, the lowland vine Aristolochia. The Zerynthiini comprise four genera – Sericinus, Bhutanitis, Zerynthia, and Allancastria.

Subfamily: Parnassiinae

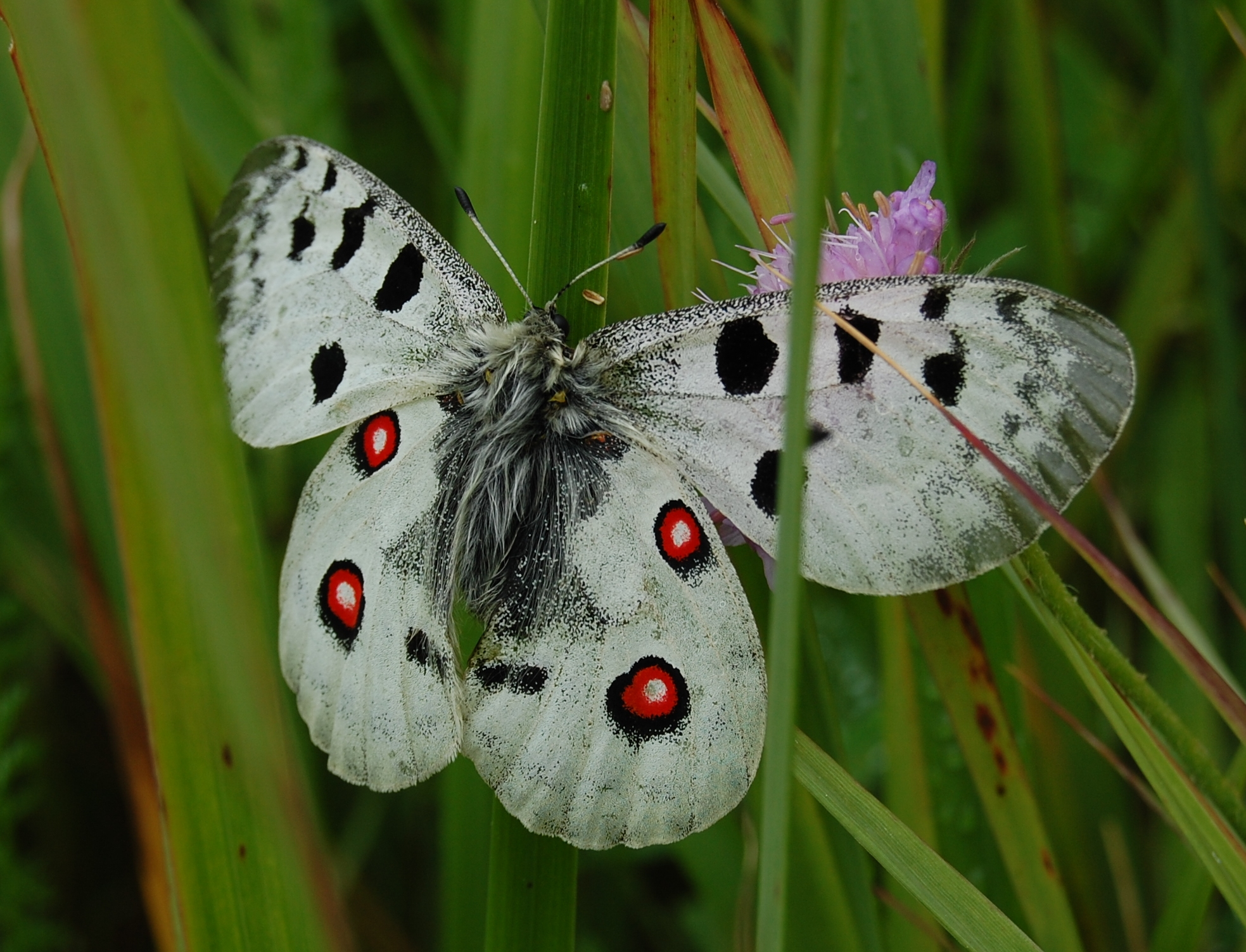
Mountain Apollo
(Parnassius apollo),
tribe Parnassiini

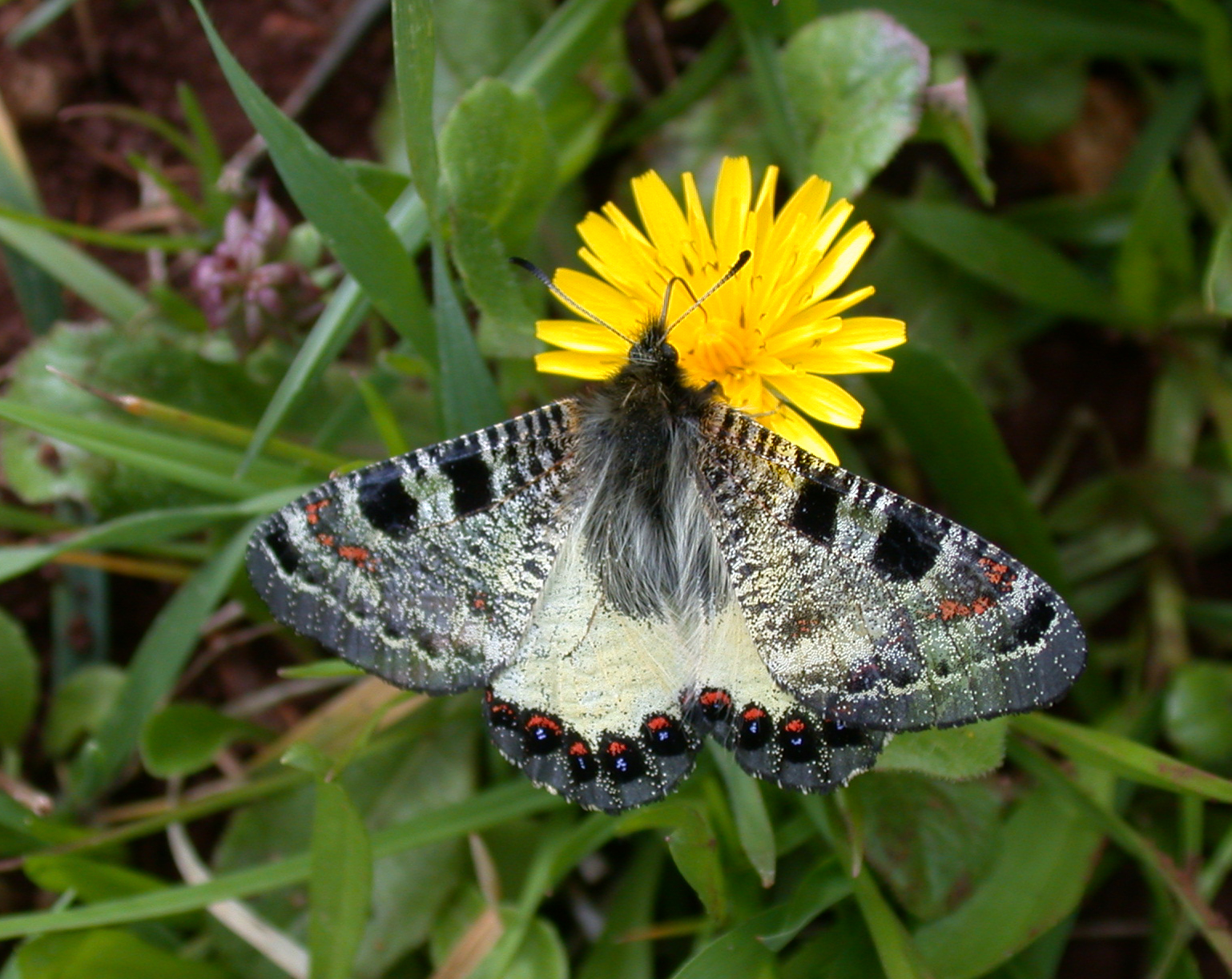
False Apollo
(Archon apollinus),
tribe Luehdorfiini

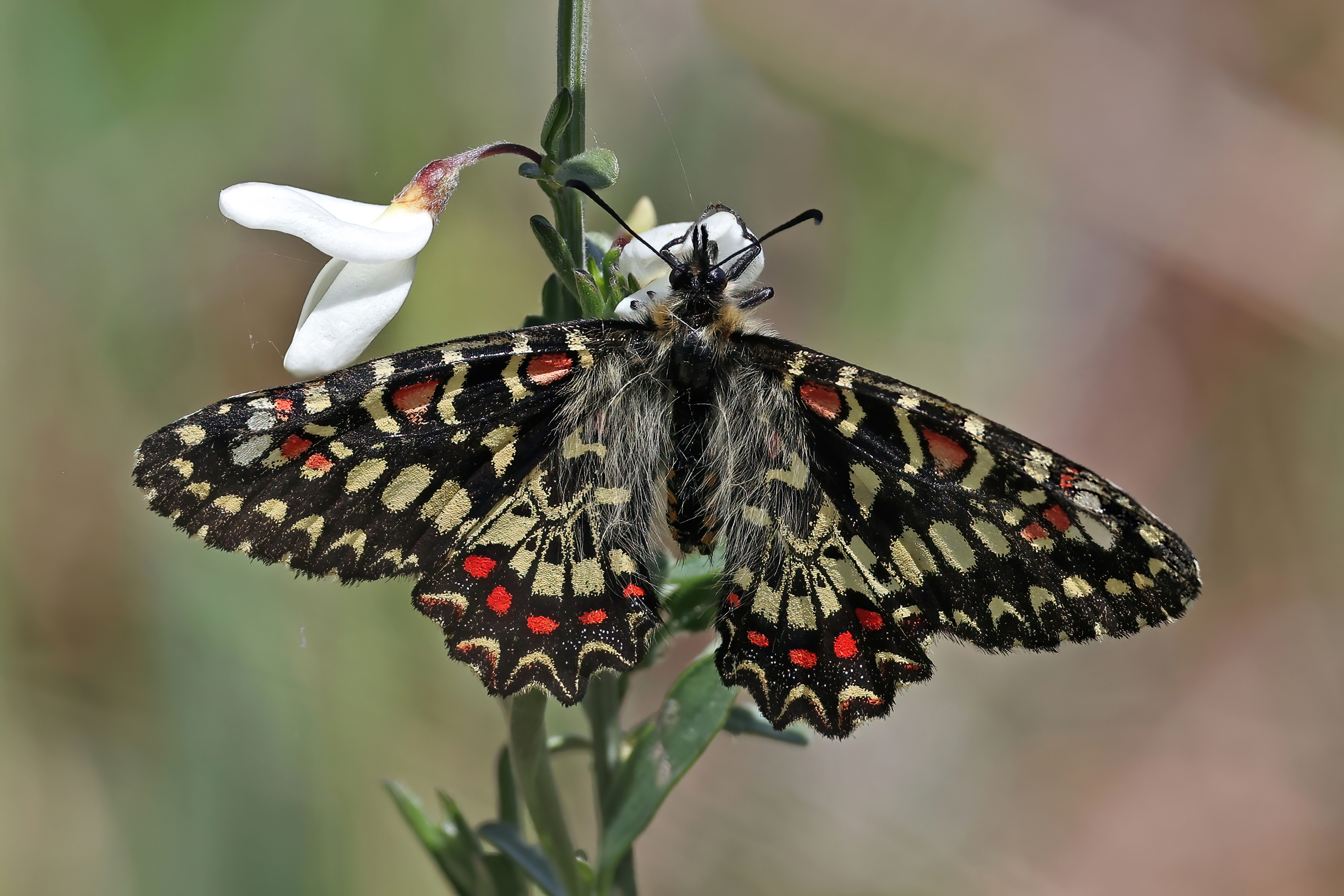
Spanish festoon
(Zerynthia rumina),
tribe Zerynthiini

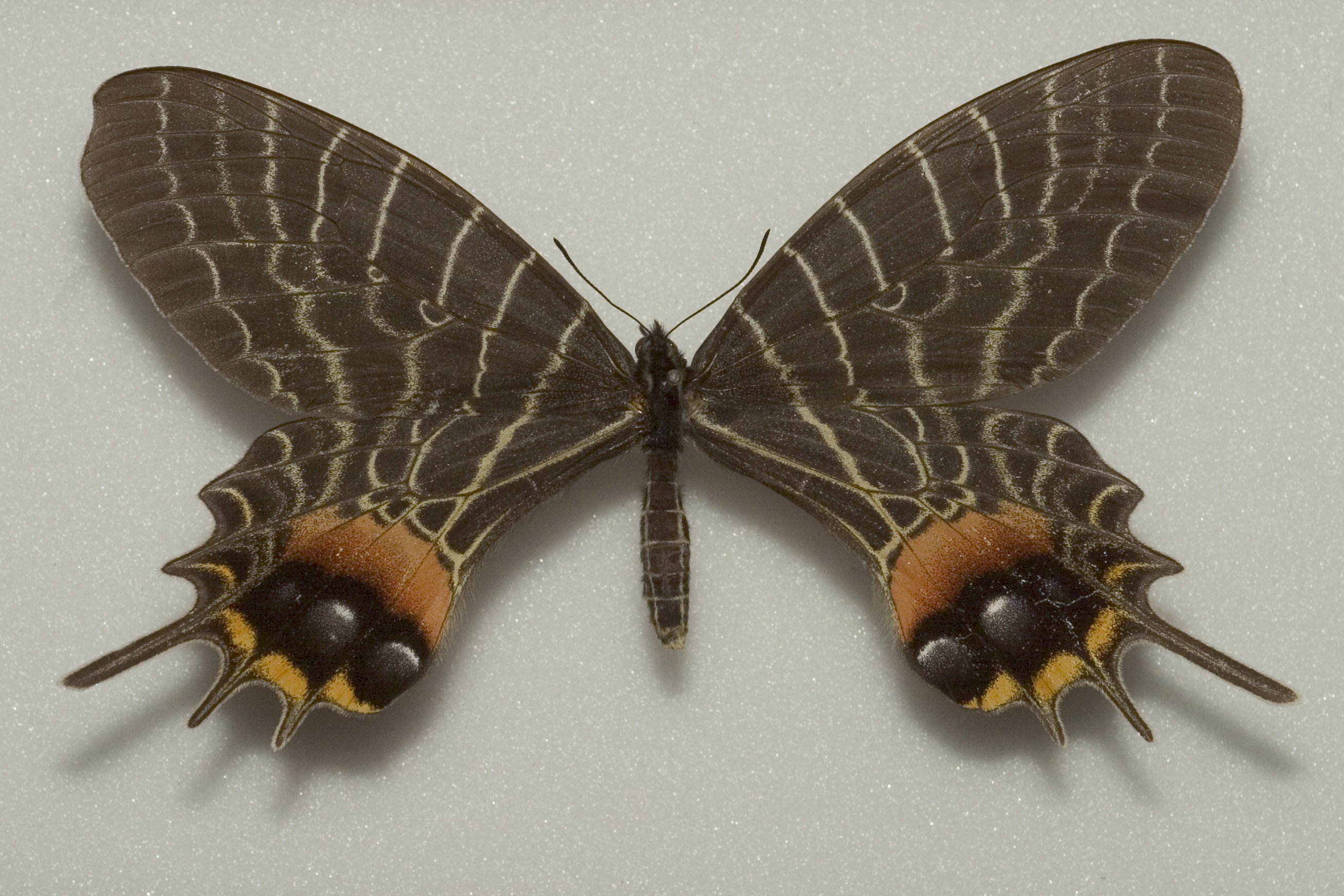
Bhutan glory
(Bhutanitis lidderdalii),
tribe Zerynthiini

==== Papilioninae ====
The tribes recognized in Papilioninae are Leptocircini, Teinopalpini, Troidini, and Papilionini.

Subfamily: Papilioninae

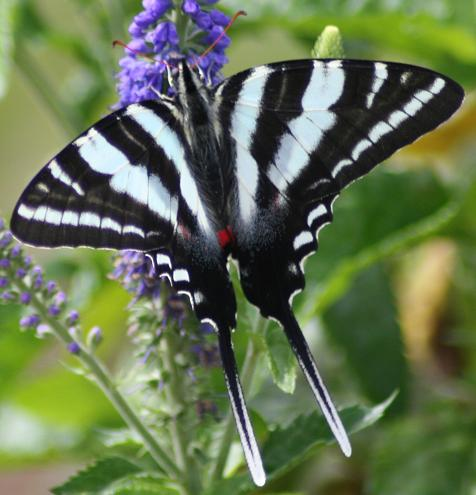
Zebra swallowtail
(Eurytides marcellus)
tribe Leptocircini

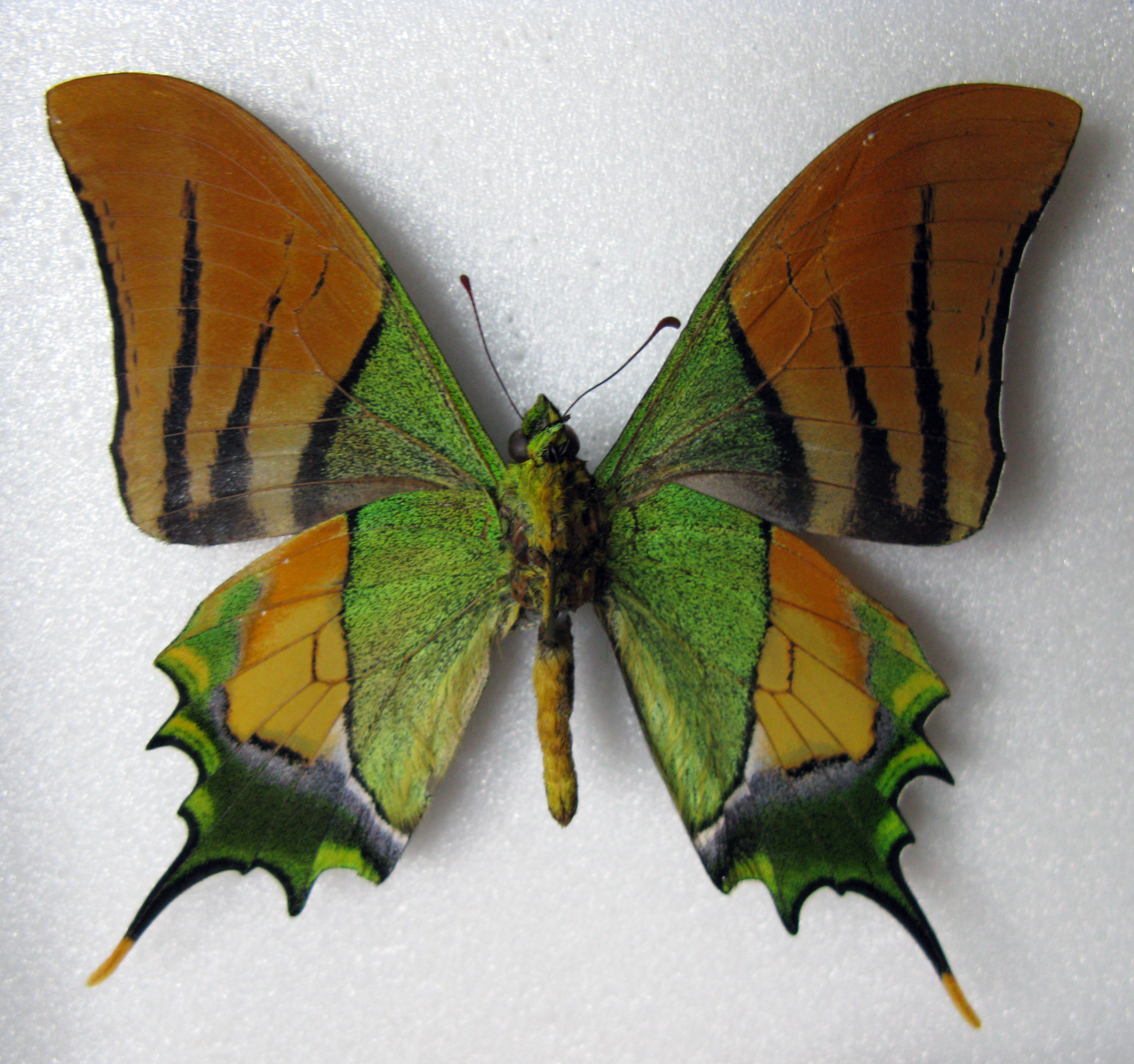
Kaiser-i-hind
(Teinopalpus imperialis)
tribe Teinopalpini

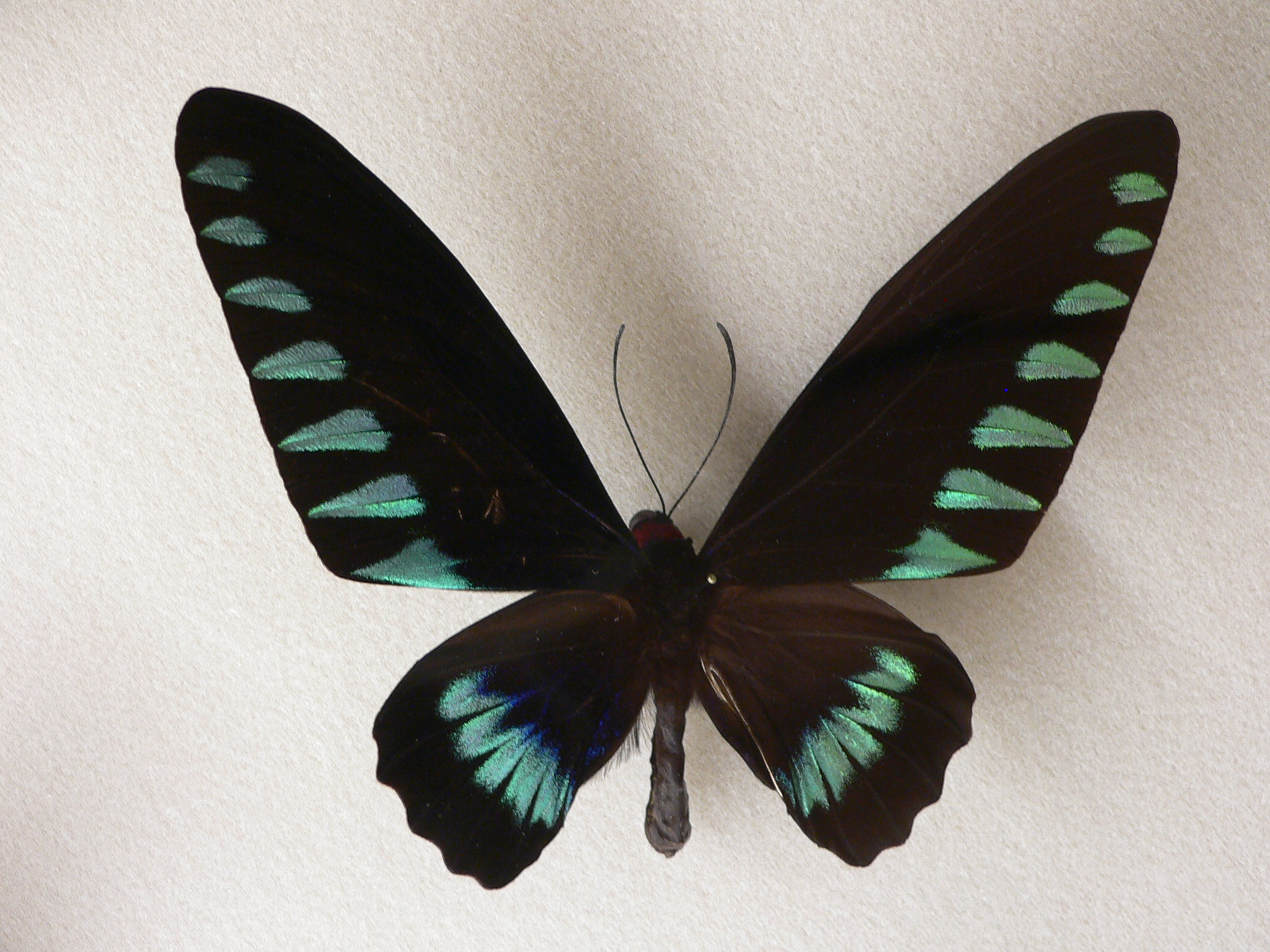
Palawan birdwing
(Trogonoptera trojana)
tribe Troidini

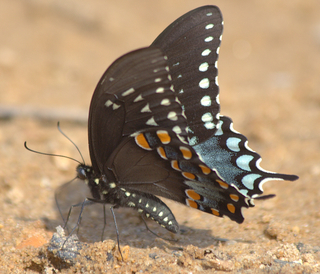
Spicebush swallowtail
(Papilio troilus)
tribe Papilionini

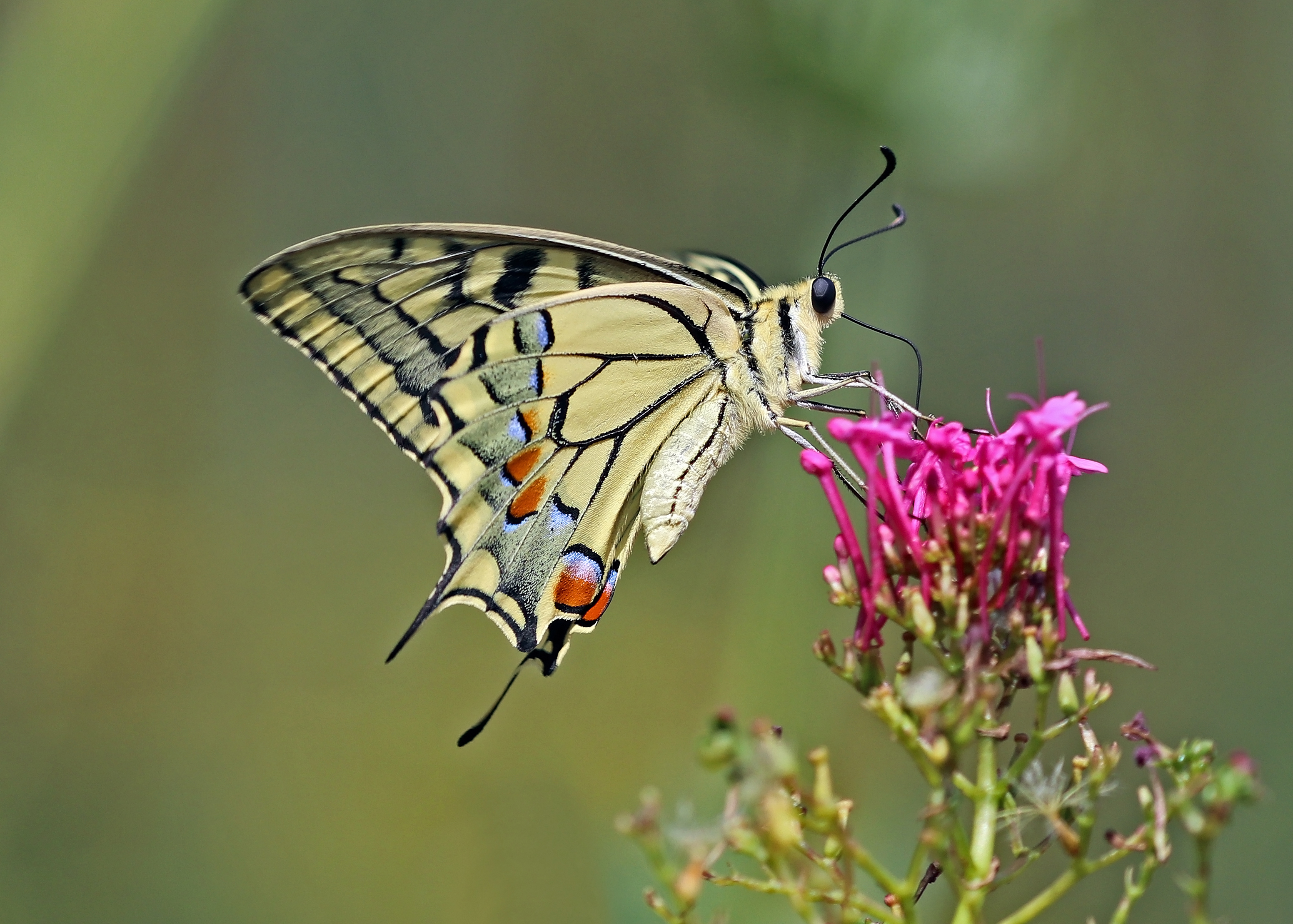
Old World swallowtail
(Papilio machaon)
tribe Papilionini

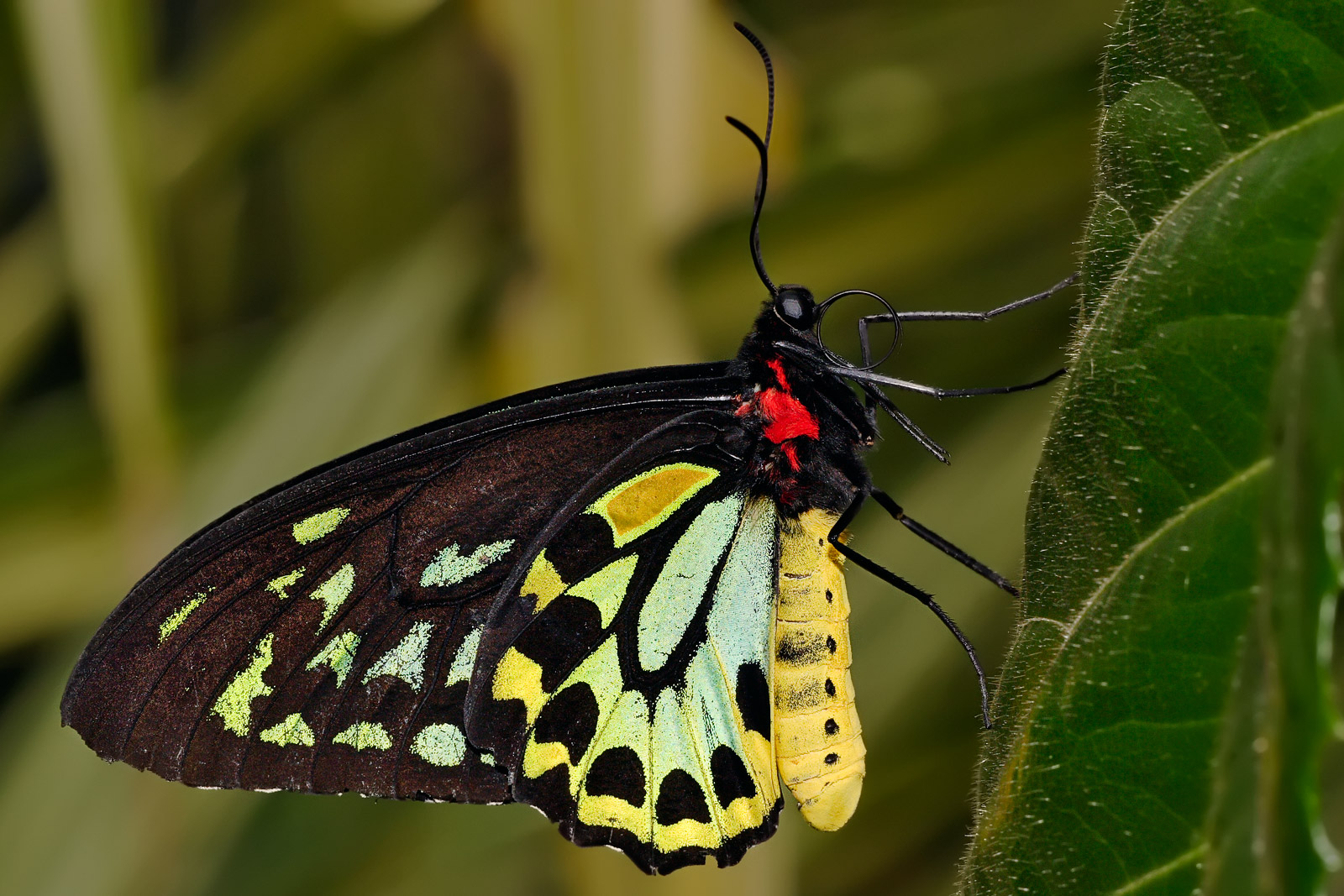
Cairns birdwing (Ornithoptera euphorion)
(G. R. Gray 1852)

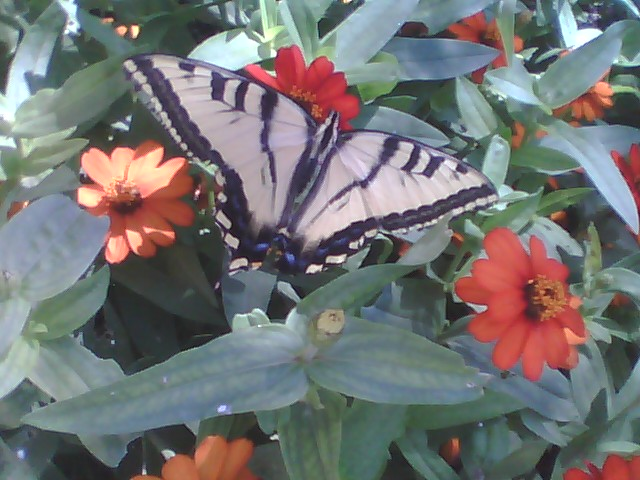
Western tiger swallowtail
(Papilio rutulus)
tribe Papilionini

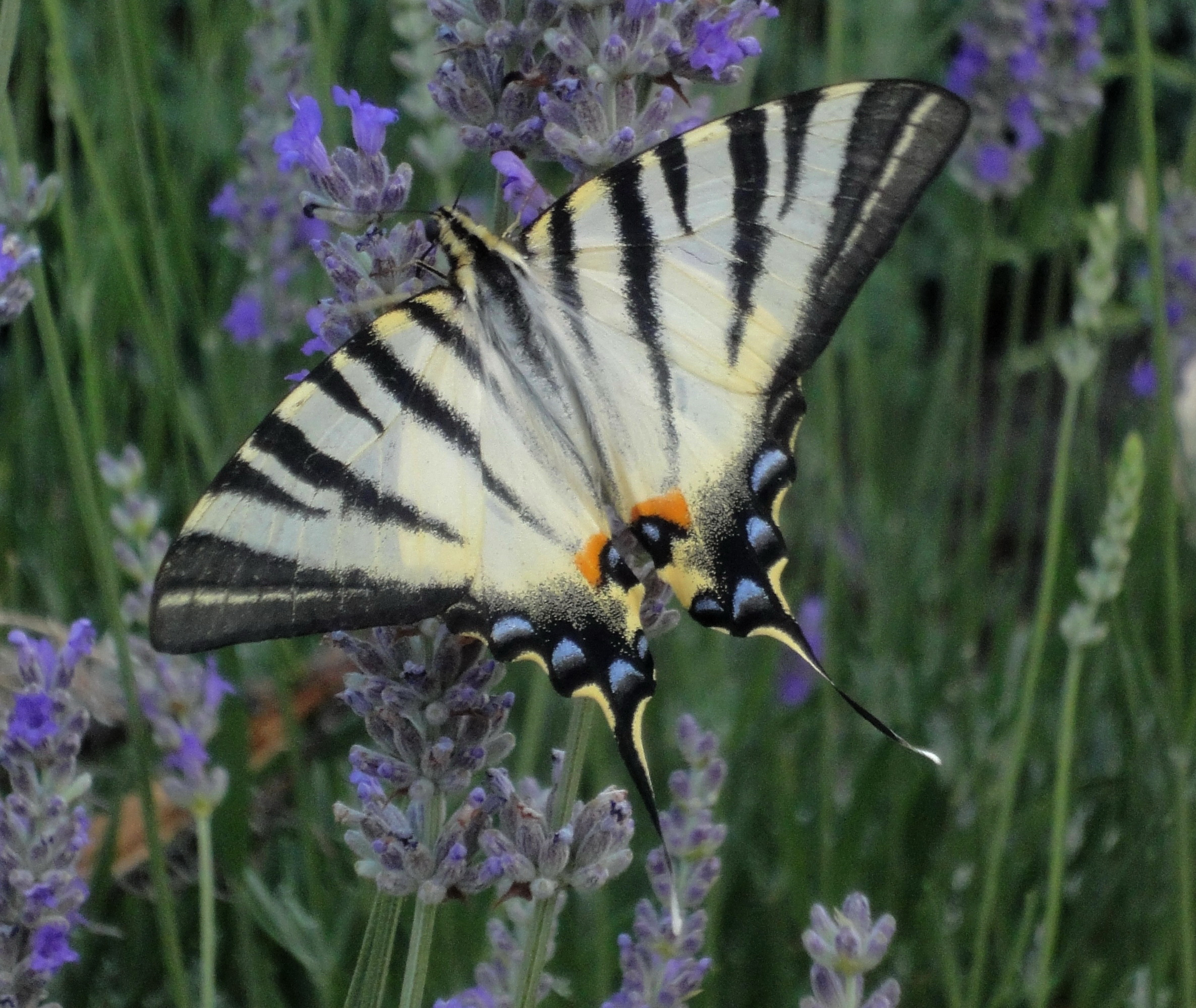
Scarce swallowtail
(Iphiclides podalirius)
tribe Leptocircini

==== Praepapilioninae ====
An additional subfamily, Praepapilioninae, consisting of a single genus Praepapilio, includes two species of extinct butterflies, each member being described from single fossils found in a middle-Eocene deposit in Colorado, United States (Durden and Rose, 1978).

== Phylogeny ==
A phylogeny of the Papilionidae based on Nazari (2007) is given:

Phylogeny of the Papilionidae

- Papilionidae
  - (†) Praepapilioninae
  - Baroniinae
  - - Parnassiinae
      - Parnassiini
      - Zerynthiini
      - Luehdorfiini
    - Papilioninae
      - - Leptocircini
        - Teinopalpini
      - - Papilionini
        - Troidini

after Nazari (2007)

The subfamily Papilioninae is now accepted to be monophyletic. The swallowtail butterflies in the nominate tribe Papilionini number about 225 species, and studies have been made on their host plant coevolution and phylogeny. Old morphological classifications were also found to be valid in that they formed clusters. Species belonging to the groups that use Rutaceae as host plants formed two groups corresponding to Old World and American taxa. Those that fed on Lauraceae and Magnoliaceae were found to form another cluster, which includes both Asian and American taxa.

Parnassinae, like Papilioninae, was also believed to be monophyletic based on morphological studies, but recent studies based on both morphological and molecular characteristics suggest that this is not the case. Among Parnassiinae, the genera Parnassius and Hypermnestra were found to be extremely close based on molecular studies and are now considered to be part of the tribe Parnassiini. The two taxa, Archon and Luehdorfia, have been found to be closely related through analysis of nuclear and mitochondrial DNA, and though they share no morphological similarities, have now been united in the tribe Luehdorfiini.

The subfamily Baroniinae is represented by the sole representative species Baronia brevicornis. They are unique in the family to use Fabaceae (Leguminosae) as their larval host plants. Baronninae and the extinct subfamily Praepapilioninae share many external similarities and are traditionally considered to be the most primitive subfamilies and sister to the rest of the swallowtails. Recent research suggests that this may not be the case, with Baroniinae being closely related to only Parnassiinae and Praepapilio to only Papilionini, with neither taxon being sister to the rest of the swallowtails.

== Distribution ==
As of 2005, 552 extant species have been identified, distributed across the tropical and temperate regions. Various species inhabit altitudes ranging from sea level to high mountains; species of Parnassius in particular often live at higher elevations. The majority of swallowtail species and the greatest diversity are found in the tropics and subtropical regions between 20°N and 20°S, particularly Southeast Asia, and between 20°N and 40°N in East Asia. Only 12 species are found in Europe and only one species, Papilio machaon, is found in the British Isles. North America has 40 species, including several tropical species and Parnassius.

The northernmost swallowtail is the Siberian Apollo (Parnassius arcticus), north of the Arctic Circle in northeastern Yakutia, at altitudes of 1500 m above sea level. In the Himalayas, various Apollo species such as Parnassius epaphus have been found at 6,000 m above sea level.

== Food ==
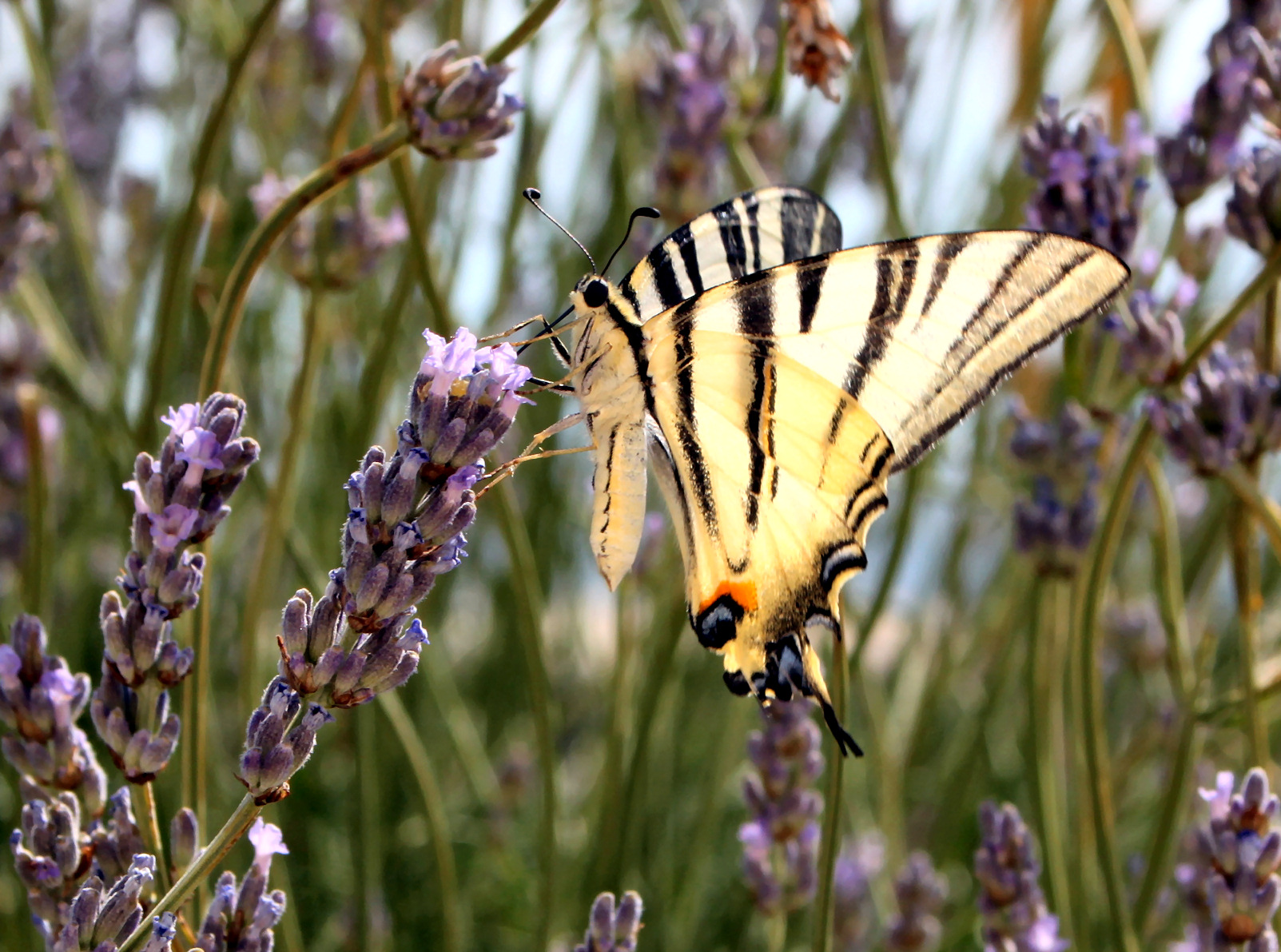
Scarce swallowtail, lavender, near Adriatic

The caterpillars of various swallowtail butterfly species feed on a wide range of different plants, most depending on only one of five families: Aristolochiaceae, Annonaceae, Lauraceae, Umbelliferae (Apiaceae), and Rutaceae. By eating some of these toxic plants, the caterpillars sequester aristolochic acid, which renders both the caterpillars and the butterflies of some of these as toxic, thus protecting them from predators. Similarly, Parnassius smintheus sequesters sarmentosin from its host plant Sedum lanceolatum for protection from predators. Swallowtail tribes Zerynthiini (Parnassiinae), Luehdorfiini (Parnassiinae) and Troidini (Papilioninae), almost exclusively use the family Aristolochiaceae as their host plants.

For example, the eastern black swallowtail's (Papilio polyxenes) main host plant in the wild is Queen Anne's lace, but they also eat garden plants in the carrot family, including carrots, parsley, dill, and fennel.

Adult swallowtails sip nectar, but also mud and sometimes manure.

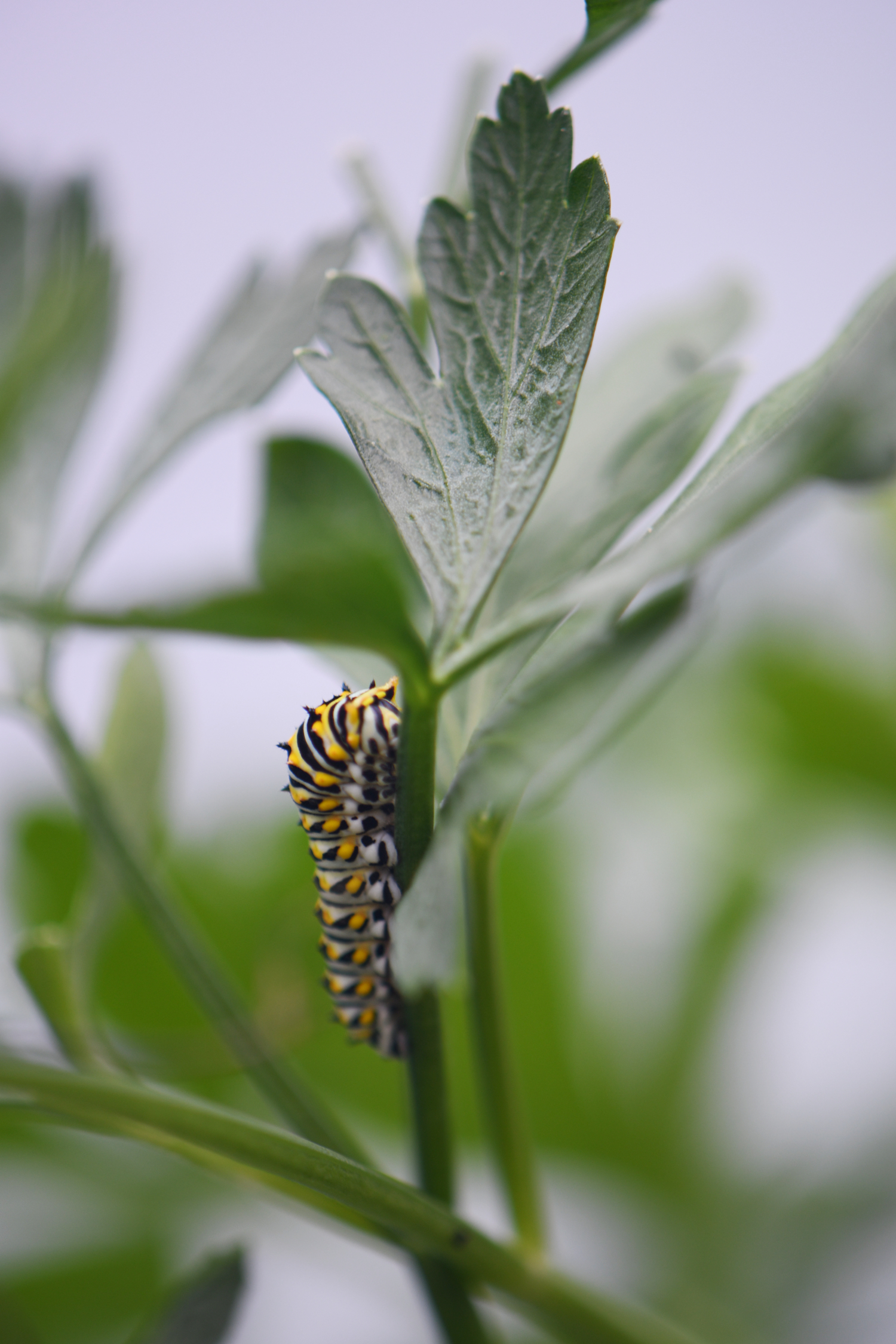
Eastern swallowtail caterpillar on parsley

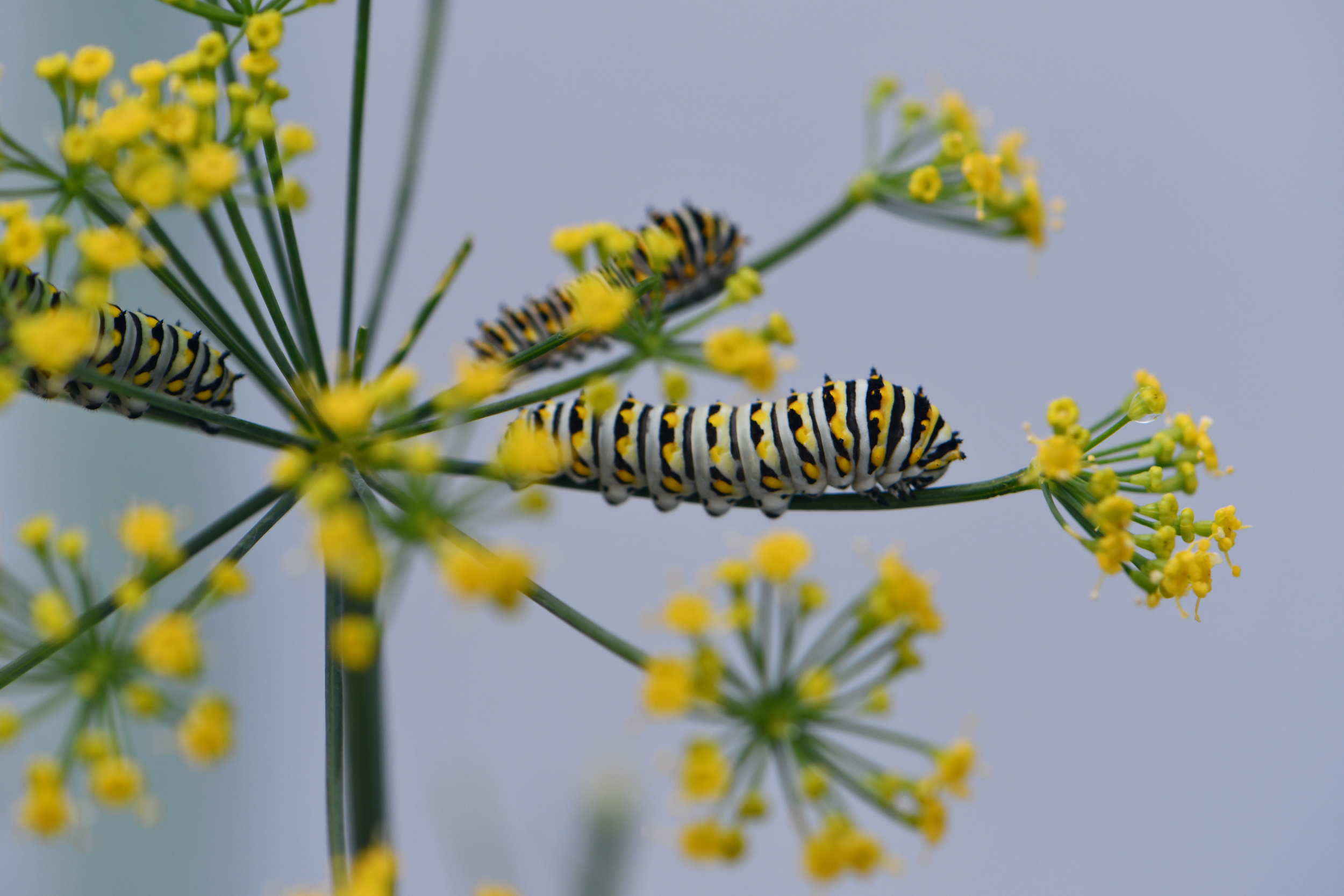
Eastern swallowtail caterpillar on dill

== Life cycle ==
The detailed descriptions of morphological characteristics of Papilionidae, as quoted in Bingham (1905) are:

Egg. "Dome-shaped, smooth or obscurely facetted, not as high as wide, somewhat leathery, opaque." (Doherty.)

Larva. Stout, smooth or with a series of fleshy tubercles on the dorsum: sometimes with a raised fleshy protuberance (the so-called hood or crest) on the fourth segment. The second segment has a transverse opening, out of which the larva protrudes at will and an erect, forked, glandular fleshy organ that emits a strong, penetrating, and somewhat unpleasant odor.

Pupa. Variable in form but most often curved backwards. It is angulate, with the head truncate or rounded and the back of abdomen is smooth or tuberculate. It is attached by the tail, normally in a perpendicular position, and further secured by a silken girth round the middle. In Parnassius, the pupa is placed in a loose silken web between leaves.

Imago. Wings extraordinarily variable in shape. Hindwing very frequently has a tail, which may be slender, or broad and spatulate, but is always an extension of the termen at vein 4. In one genus, Armandia, the termen of the hindwing is prolonged into tails at the apices of veins 2 and 3 as well as at vein 4. Forewing (except in the aberrant genera Parnassius and Hypermnestra) with all 12 veins present and in addition a short internal vein, vein 1 a, that invariably terminates on the dorsal margin.

Stages of development of a papilionid, the giant swallowtail (Papilio cresphontes)

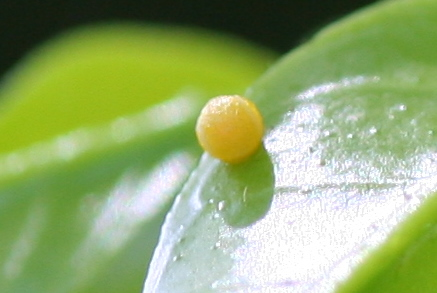
Egg

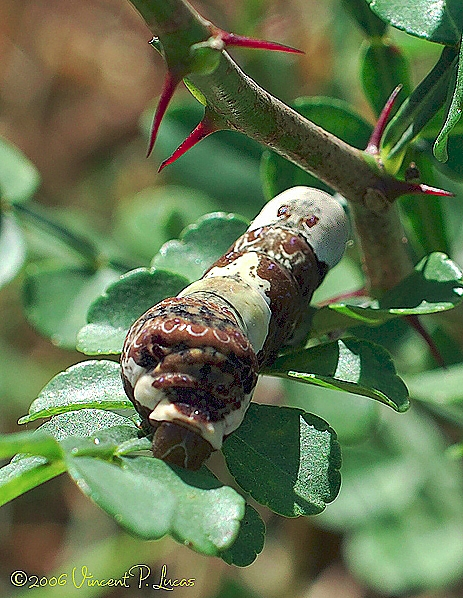
Larva

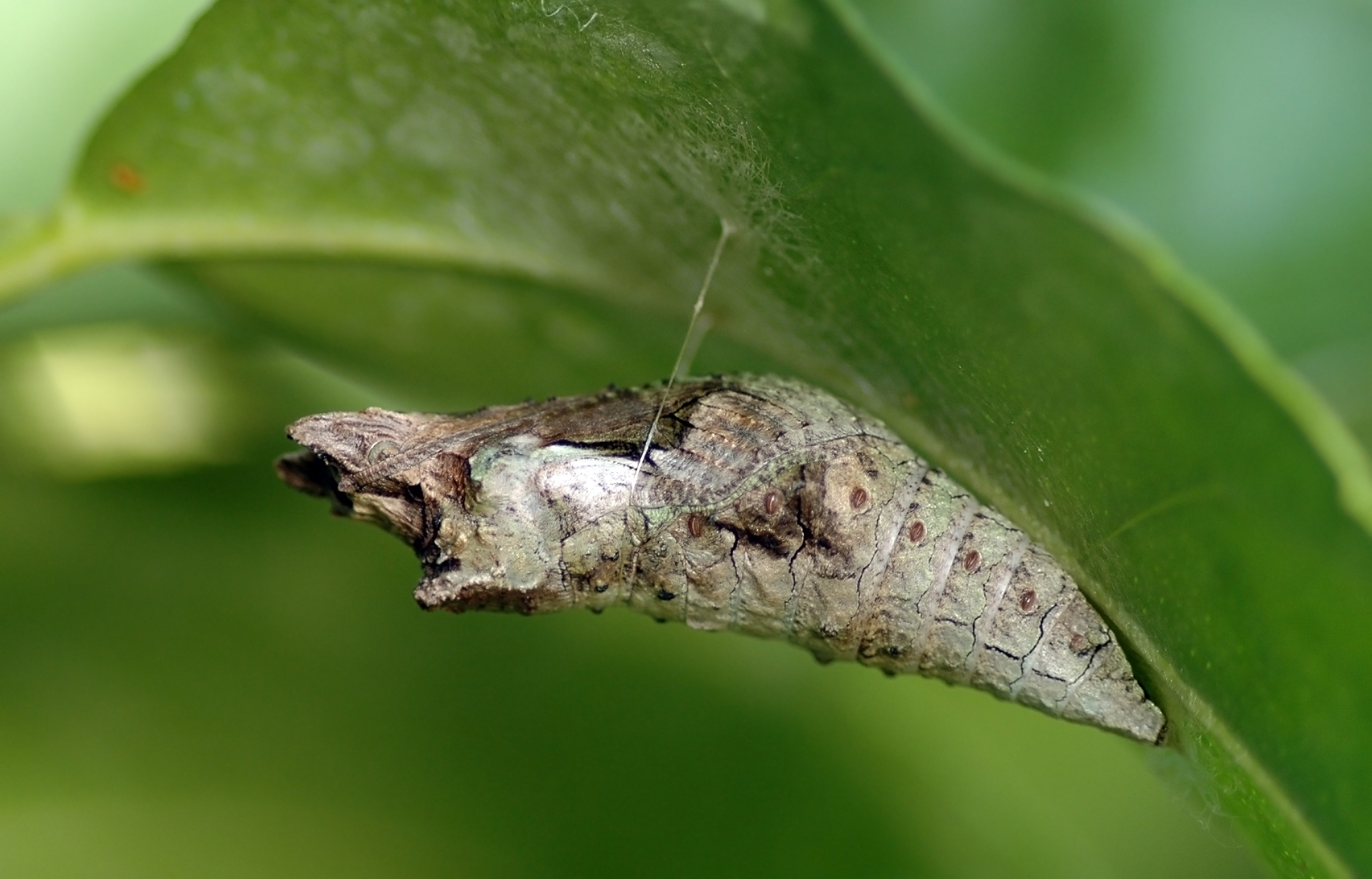
Pupa

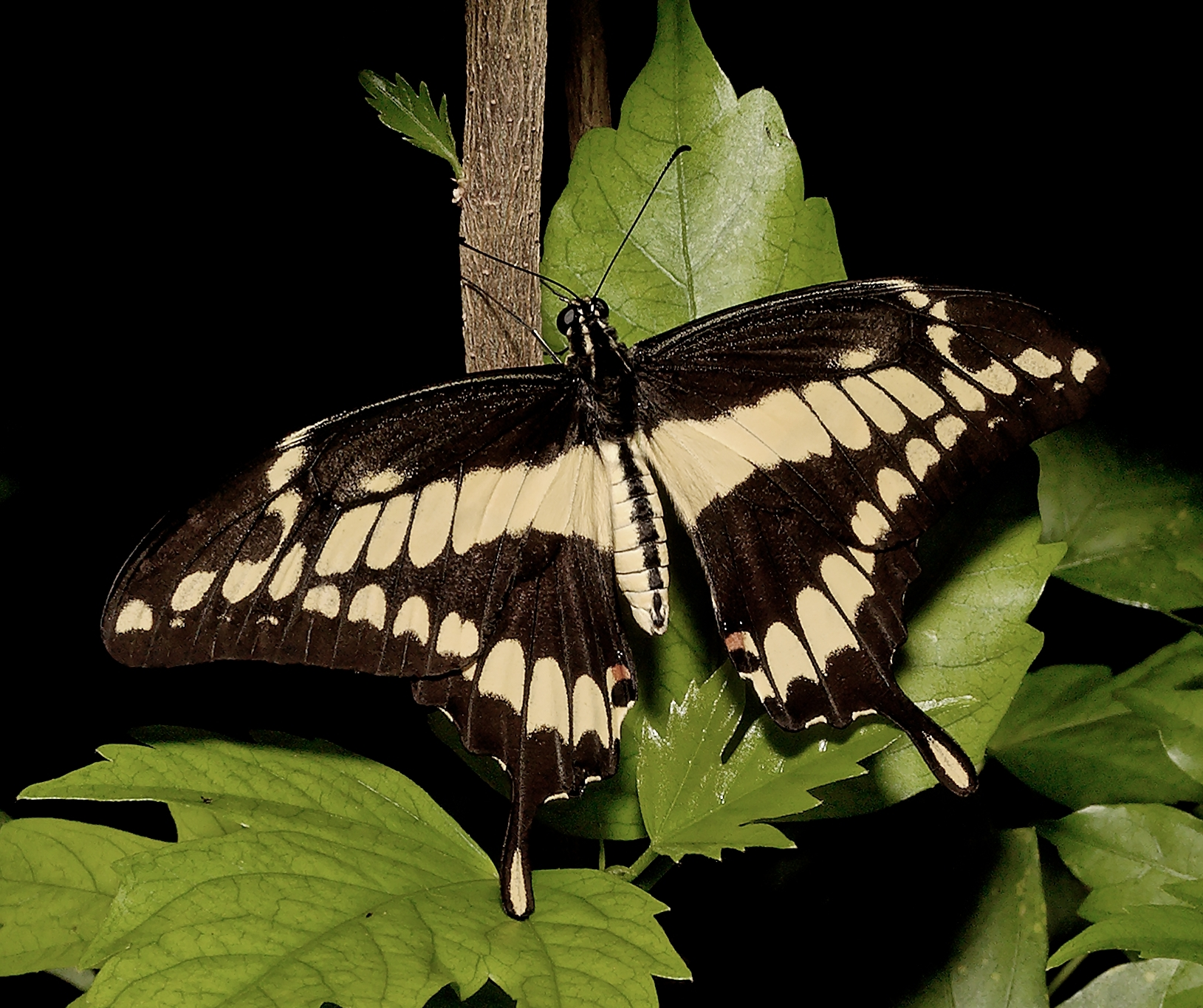
Butterfly

== Distinguishing characteristics ==
The key characteristics that differentiate Papilionidae from the other butterfly families are:

- The osmeterium is a forked, fleshy, eversible organ found in the prothoracic segment of caterpillars.
- Venation – in swallowtails, the second anal vein, 2A, extends up to the wing margin and does not link with the first anal vein, 1A. These veins are fused in other butterfly families and 2A does not reach the wing margin.
- The sclerites of the cervix (membranous neck between the head and thorax) are fused beneath the neck where the muscles for head movement are anchored.
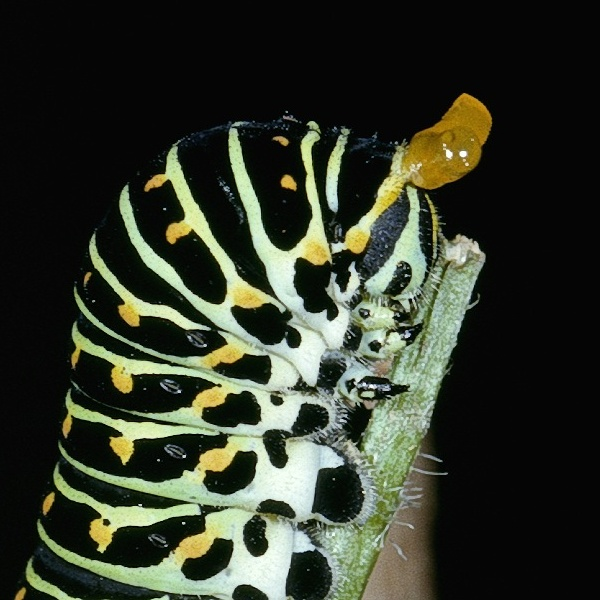
Old World swallowtail caterpillar everting its osmeterium in defense.

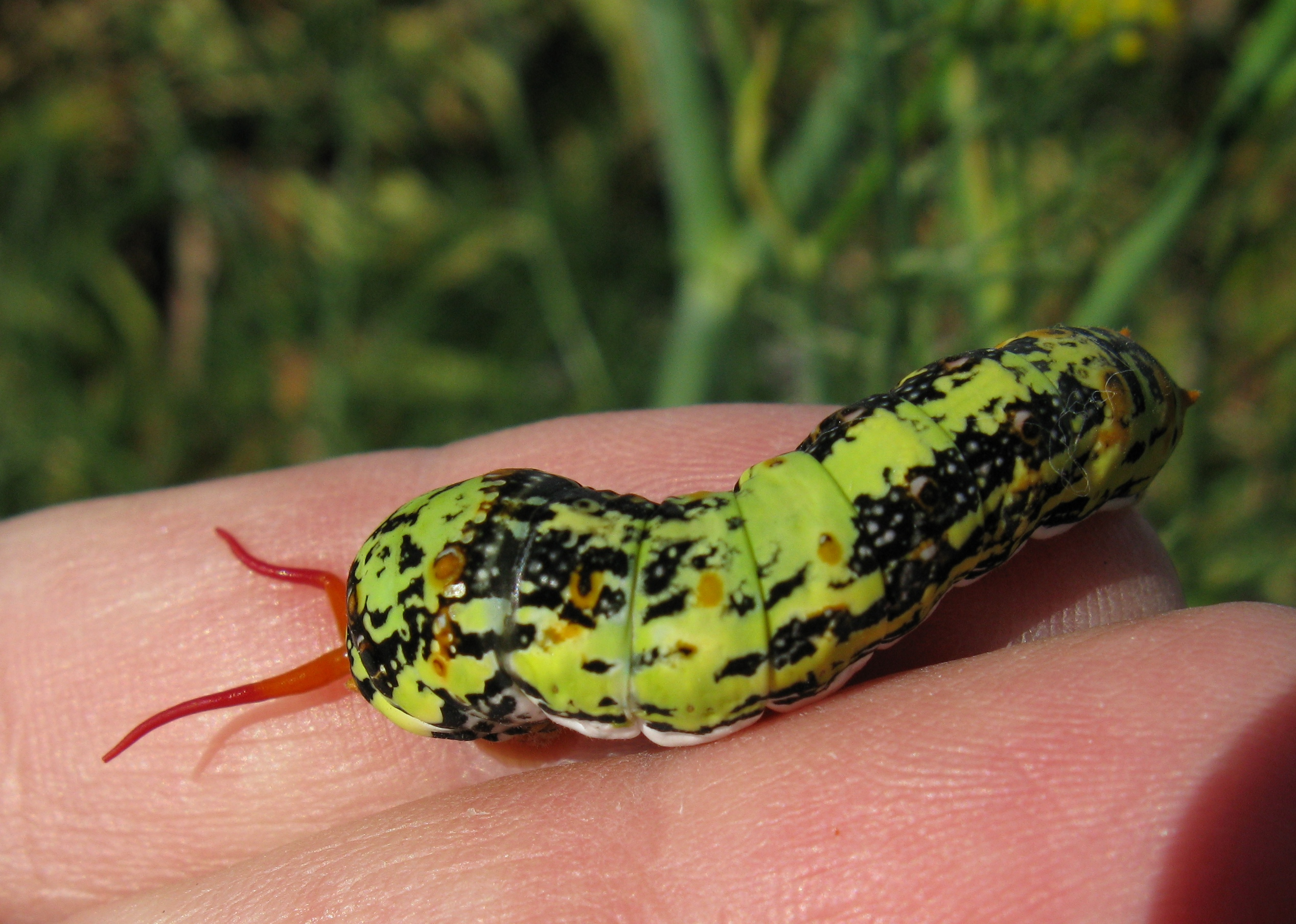
Papilio demodocus larva applying one horn of the evaginated osmeterium to an offending finger.

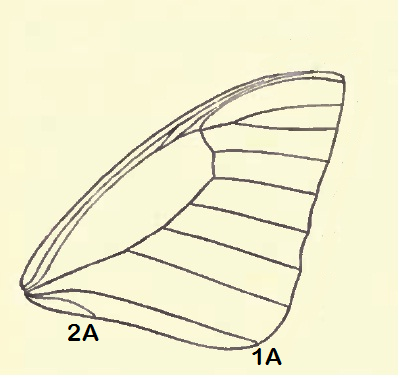
Adult forewing of Graphium agetes. Second anal vein, 2A, extends up to the wing margin and does not link with the first anal vein, 1A.

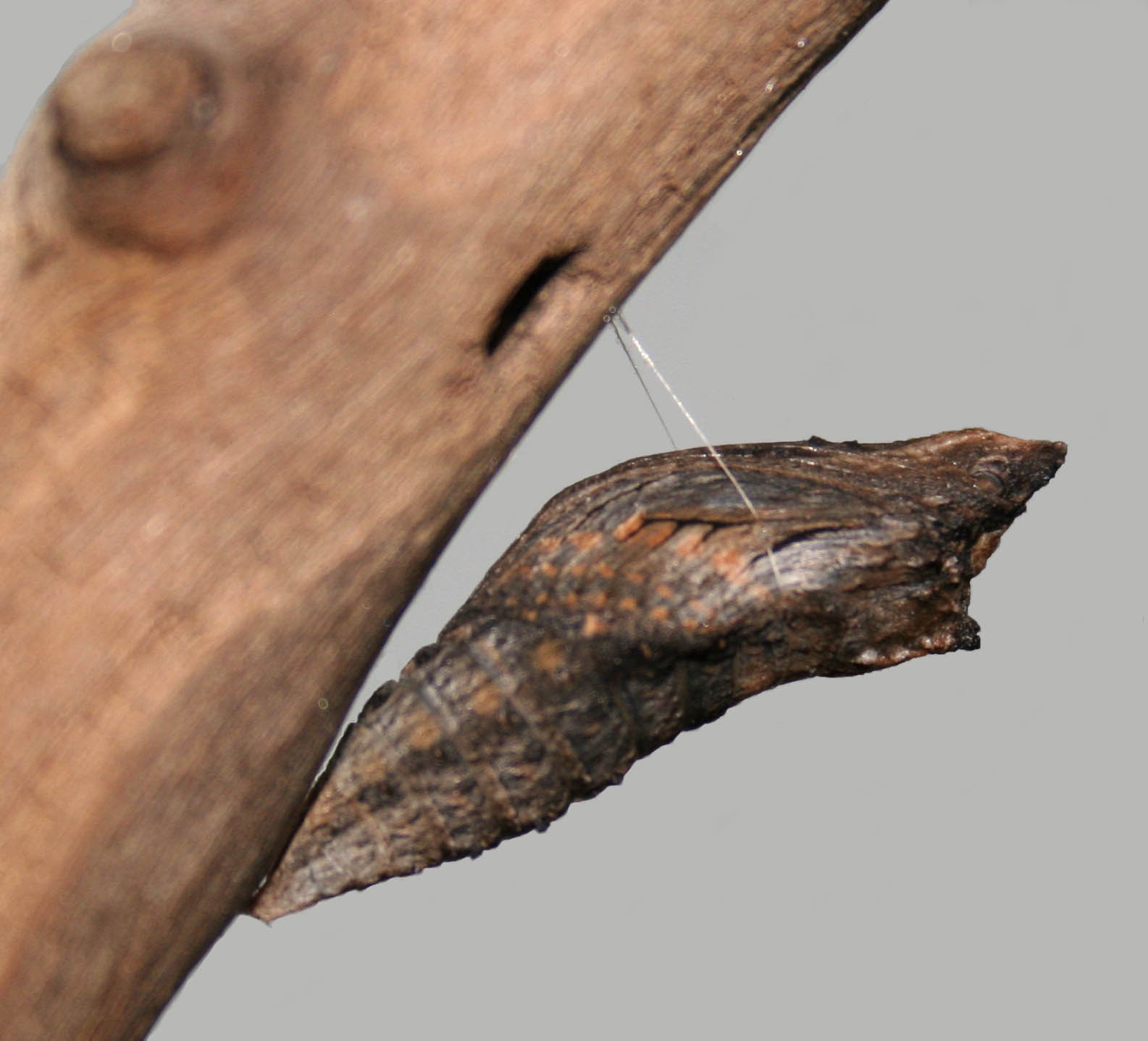
Papilionid chrysalis are typically attached to a substrate by the cremaster and with head up held by a silk girdle.

== Special adaptations and defense ==
Swallowtail butterflies practice Batesian mimicry, a behavior in which the butterflies' appearance closely resemble that of distasteful species that prevents predation. Swallowtails differ from many animals that practice mimicry. The tiger swallowtail butterfly (Papilio glaucus), exhibits a female-limited polymorphism for Batesian mimicry and others, such as the Canadian tiger swallowtail (Papilio canadensis) do not display any form of mimicry.

Predators include the red-winged blackbird, Pennsylvania firefly, five-lined skink, green darner, goldenrod spider, Chinese mantis, fiery searcher, and striped skunk.

=== Biological basis for polymorphisms in mimicry ===
Not all individuals in some species are identical in appearance. For example, Papilio glaucus (eastern tiger swallowtail), Y-linkage determines whether the females are either wild-type (yellow and black) or melanic (dark melanin replaces the yellow background). This genetic difference stems from the fact that melanism is controlled by a single gene, which controls the level of dopamine in the organism. The enzyme BAS, which assists dopamine in producing the yellow pigmentation, normally found on the wings' background, is suppressed. Without the pigmentation, the butterfly appears mostly black (the melanic form) and is a Batesian mimic of Battus philenor, the pipevine swallowtail. Also, some of Papilio glaucus are not wholly black; several possess an intermediate "sooty" color and are sensitive to temperature.

The different polymorphisms (wild-type, melanic, and the "sooty" intermediate) depend upon the geographical distribution and abundance of its mimic, Battus philenor, whose wing color varies depending on its geographical location. To be successfully confused for B. philenor by predators, Papilio glaucus's background wing color matches that of B. philenor residing in the same regional area. Studies support this theory; in the Southeastern United States, the relative abundance of melanic females has been found to correlate geographically with B. philenor.

=== Mimicry ===
Only certain subsets of swallowtails practice mimicry. Species differ in whether one or both sexes are mimetic, and whether the mimicry is monomorphic or polymorphic. A phenomenon that has received particular attention is female-limited polymorphism, in which only the females of a species are mimetic and polymorphic, often mimicking different, distantly related aposematic butterflies. This polymorphism is seen in Papilio dardanus, the African swallowtail butterfly, whose females have three different morphs for wing color pattern, a black-and-white pattern for Batesian mimicry, a black-and-yellow pattern that resembles the males of the species, and a pattern with orange patches that resembles the elderly males of the species. Given that the males of the species, which do not have Batesian mimicry, are preyed upon much more frequently by predators than the females, an ongoing question is why females would exhibit the nonmimetic wing pattern, which would seemingly lower their fitness compared to the mimicry form. The pipevine swallowtail exhibits Batesian mimicry, as well.

Several hypotheses for this phenomenon were made, the two noteworthy being the pseudosexual selection hypothesis and the male avoidance hypothesis. In the pseudosexual hypothesis, male butterflies aggressively approached the male-looking females and then mellowed their behavior into sexual behavior when they were close enough to identify them as females. In the male avoidance hypothesis, female butterflies disguise themselves in an attempt to evade male harassment, as courtship can be harmful, time-consuming, and attract predators.

One study recorded male responses to females of each morph and found that the males consistently favored the Batesian mimics, then the black and yellow, and then the morph with orange patches. The scientists concluded that frequency-dependent selection did lead to equal success for all three alternative strategies; the Batesian females suffered the fewest predators, but their fitness was reduced the most by sexual harassment, while the other two faced lower sexual harassment, but also lost fitness from predators' attacks.

== Mating and young ==
After mating, male parnassiines produce a glue-like substance that is used to seal the female genital opening and prevent other males from mating. They lay individual eggs on the underside of the leaves of their food plants. No parental investment occurs once the eggs have been laid.

The pupae are typically attached to the substrate by the cremaster, but with head up held by a silk girdle. The Apollos, however, pupate in debris on the ground and also build a loose cocoon. In temperate regions, the winters are passed in a pupal diapause stage.

== In culture ==
Since swallowtail butterflies are large, colorful, and attractive, they have been targeted by butterfly collectors. The largest of these, the birdwing butterflies, are particularly sought after and are cultured in butterfly farms to supply collectors.

Many members of the family, as larvae, feed on plants of the citrus family Rutaceae, and some of them are pests in citrus orchards.

The Oregon swallowtail is the state insect of Oregon. The eastern tiger swallowtail is the state insect of Virginia and the state butterfly of Georgia, Delaware, and South Carolina. The black swallowtail is the state butterfly of New Jersey and Oklahoma.

The tabletop role-playing game Lancer includes a support- and sensor-focused mech named the Swallowtail.
