= Ismene (disambiguation) =

Ismene refers to:

== Mythology ==
- Ismene, the daughter and half-sister of Oedipus
- Ismene (Asopid), a character in Greek mythology

== Other ==
- Ismene (plant), a genus of perennial bulbs
- Ismene (moth), a genus of moths of the family Crambidae
- 190 Ismene, a main belt asteroid
