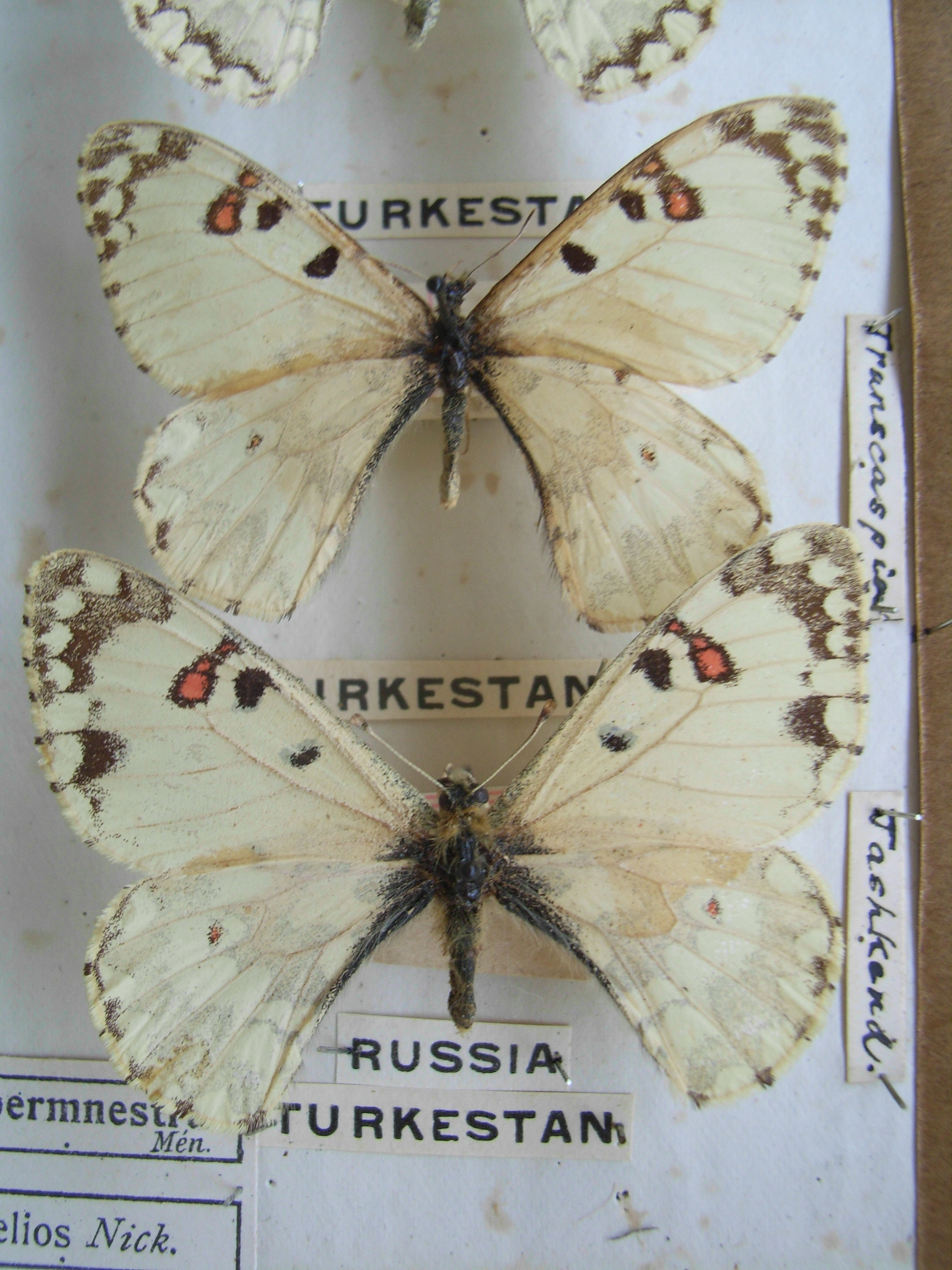

Scientific classification
- Kingdom: Animalia
- Phylum: Arthropoda
- Class: Insecta
- Order: Lepidoptera
- Family: Papilionidae
- Tribe: Parnassiini
- Genus: Hypermnestra; Ménétriés, 1848
- Species: H. helios

Binomial name
- Hypermnestra helios (Nickerl, 1846)

= Hypermnestra helios =

Species of butterfly

Hypermnestra helios is a species of swallowtail butterfly belonging to the Parnassinae family and is the sole member of the genus Hypermnestra. It is found in Iran, Afghanistan, Pakistan, Turkmenistan, Kyrgyzstan, Tajikistan, and Uzbekistan. It is locally common in desert habitats.

== Description ==
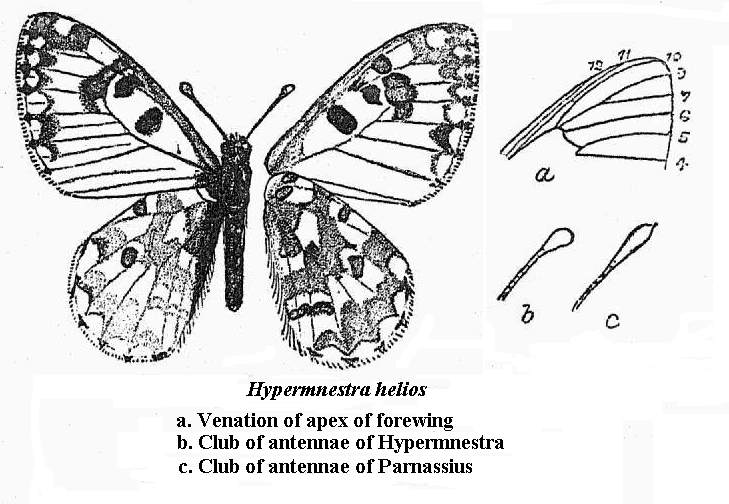

Male upperside: white, with a slight cream-yellow tint. Forewing: base densely, costal margin lightly, irrorated (speckled) with black scales; cell with a transverse black median and a black apical spot, the latter extends from the costa along the discocellulars almost to the lower apex of cell; beyond the cell an oblique, short black bar, widened posteriorly and with three superposed red spots, the middle spot minute, sometimes absent; this is followed by an irregular subterminal black band, widened at the veins, widest near the costa, and gradually narrowed to a faint line posteriorly. In many specimens this band is not extended below vein 5, in others it reaches or almost reaches the tornal angle and is joined in its extension downwards to a prominent black transverse spot in interspace 3. Beyond this band the apex is marked with a small diffuse black patch, and the apices of the veins with black spots that are extended inwards to the subterminal band. Hindwing: base and dorsal margin broadly irrorated with black scales: a black upper discal and a subcostal spot, both generally centred with red; a subterminal series of slender black lunules, followed by a terminal row of transversely linear black spots; the middle and postdiscal areas of the wing darkened by the markings of the underside that show through by transparency. Cilia of both forewings and hindwings white alternated with black. Underside: ground colour similar. Forewing: markings as on the upperside, but the cellular spots, the spot in interspace 3 and the short bar beyond apex of cell larger, more intensely black, the red spots on the last also larger; the subterminal and terminal markings paler, more diffuse. Hindwing with basal, median and subterminal broad transverse bands of irrorated black scales, all the bands with their margins uneven and zigzag; the outer margin of the basal band with four transversely placed red spots, and transverse red discal spots edged with black in interspaces 1, 2, 5 and 7; the termen margined with a fine, more or less interrupted, black line. In a few specimens the red spots are more or less obsolescent.

Antennae: Pale yellowish white, the shafts obscurely ringed with black head, thorax and abdomen, black, the head and the thorax anteriorly with long greyish-white hairs; beneath: the palpi, thorax, legs and basal portion of the abdomen similarly clothed.

Female: Differs from the male as follows: Upperside: All the markings larger and more conspicuous; an additional large black spot in the middle of interspace 1. Underside: Similar to that of the male, but with the additional black spot as noted above.

== Food plants ==
The larvae feed on plants of the genus Zygophyllum including Z. atriplicoides, Z. gontsharovi, Z. portulacoides, Z. fabago, Z. turcomanicum, Z. oxianum, and Z. macrophyllum.

== Nomenclature ==
According to Francis Hemming, Édouard Ménétries proposed the name Hypermnestra in 1846 as a replacement name for Ismene Nickerl, 1846, which is an invalid junior homonym of Ismene Savigny, 1816 and Ismene Swainson, 1820. However, the introduction of this name by Ménétriés was overlooked for a long time, and Hypermnestra was attributed either to Heydenreich 1851 or to Westwood, [1852].
