= Praepapilio =

Praepapilio Temporal range: Lutetian

Scientific classification
- Kingdom: Animalia
- Phylum: Arthropoda
- Class: Insecta
- Order: Lepidoptera
- Family: Papilionidae
- Subfamily: †Praepapilioninae; Tindale, 1984
- Genus: †Praepapilio; Durden and Rose, 1978

Species
- 2; see text

Extinct genus of butterflies

Praepapilio is an extinct genus of swallowtail butterfly from the middle Eocene deposits of Colorado, United States, comparable to the Lutetian epoch in age. The genus is considered to be the only representative of the fossil subfamily Praepapilioninae.

Praepapilio is, so far, the only wholly extinct subtaxon known within the swallowtail family. Two species have been described, each from a single fossil find.

== Species ==
=== P. colorado ===
The holotype of P. colorado, the type species of the genus, is from the Middle Eocene-aged Green River Shale, Parachute Creek Member, near Raydome, Colorado. Durden and Rose, in their 1978 paper, compare P. colorado to the extant Baronia brevicornis, and suggest that P. gracilis may be the same species as P. colorado, and that the differences between the two are possibly due to sexual dimorphism.

=== P. gracilis ===
As with P. colorado, the holotype of P. gracilis was from the same site in Colorado. It differs from the type species in being smaller and more gracile in form, though anatomical differences may be due to sexual dimorphism.
