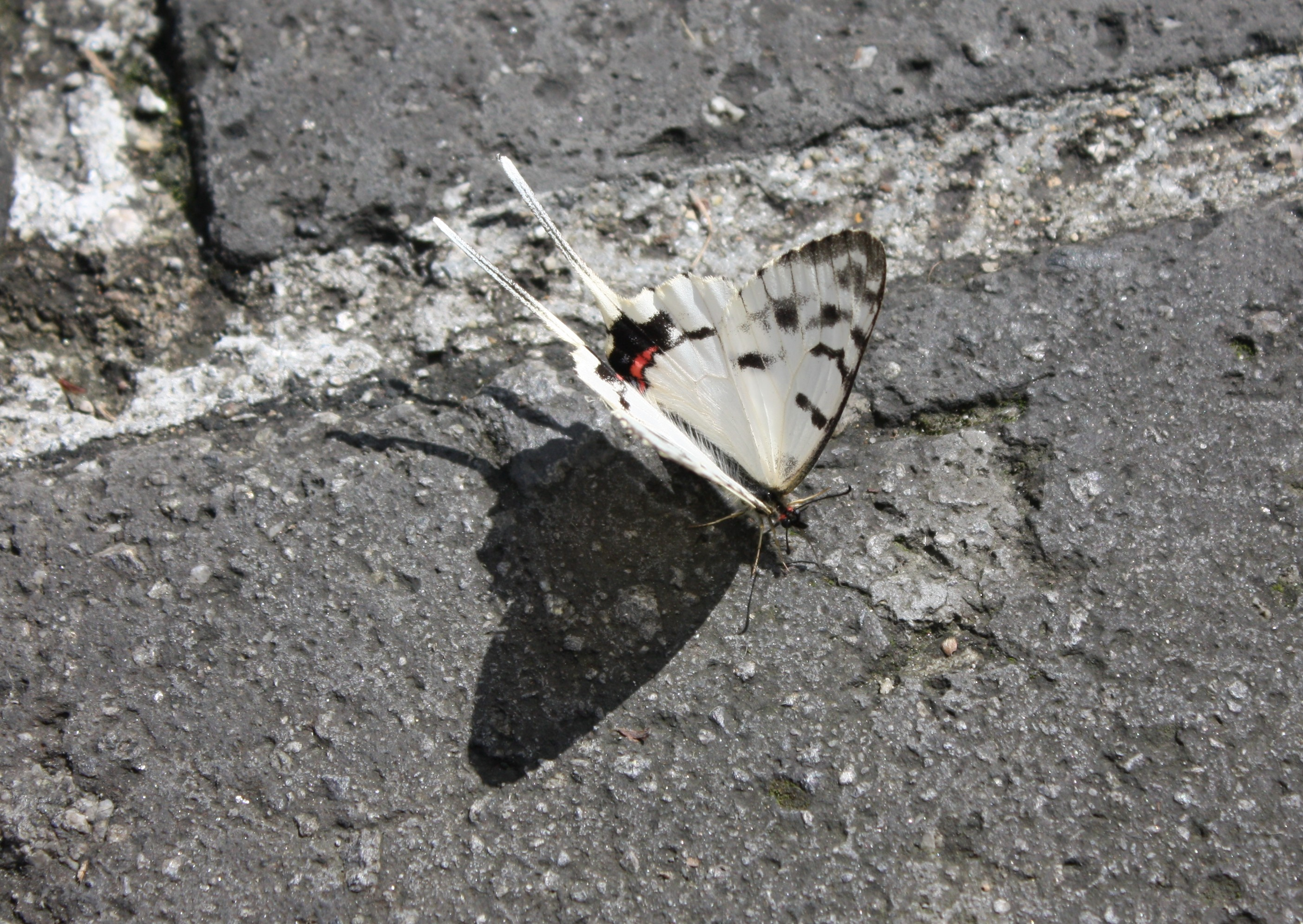
- male

Scientific classification
- Kingdom: Animalia
- Phylum: Arthropoda
- Clade: Pancrustacea
- Class: Insecta
- Order: Lepidoptera
- Family: Papilionidae
- Genus: Sericinus; Westwood, 1851
- Species: S. montela

Binomial name
- Sericinus montela Gray, 1852

Synonyms
- Papilio telamon Donovan, 1798; Sericinus fortunei Gray, 1852; Sericinus telamon subsp. absurdus Bryk, 1913; Sericinus telamon subsp. eisneri Bryk, 1932; Sericinus telamon subsp. elegans Bryk, 1913; Sericinus telamon f. strandi Bryk, 1913; Sericinus telamon subsp. hoenei Bryk, 1932; Sericinus telamon subsp. hunanensis Hering, 1935; Sericinus telamon subsp. kansuensis Eisner, 1962; Sericinus telamon subsp. leechi Rothschild, 1918; Sericinus telamon subsp. magnus Fruhstorfer, 1913; Sericinus telamon subsp. roseni Bryk, 1932; Sericinus telamon subsp. rudolphi Bryk, 1932; Sericinus telamon subsp. shantungensis Hering, 1935; Sericinus telamon subsp. telmonula Bryk, 1932; Sericinus telamon var. amurensis Staudinger, 1892; Sericinus telamon var. fixseni Staudinger, 1892; Sericinus telamon var. koreana Fixsen, 1887; Sericinus telamon var. telemachus Staudinger, 1892; Sericinus telmona Gray, 1852

= Sericinus =

Genus of butterflies

Sericinus is a genus of swallowtail butterflies placed in the subfamily Parnassiinae. The genus has a complex history and a multiplicity of names have been applied to its single species.

Sericinus montela, the dragon swallowtail, is the only species, making the genus monotypic. It is found in the Russian Far East (south of Primorsky Krai), Korea, China and Japan.

== Taxonomy ==
See Notes below for abbreviations used

Sericinus Westwood, 1851 (Transactions of the Entomological Society of London. NS I: 173), monobasic telamon Donovan (Sericinus Wood, 1877: Suicinus Draesecke, 1923) montela Gray, 1853.

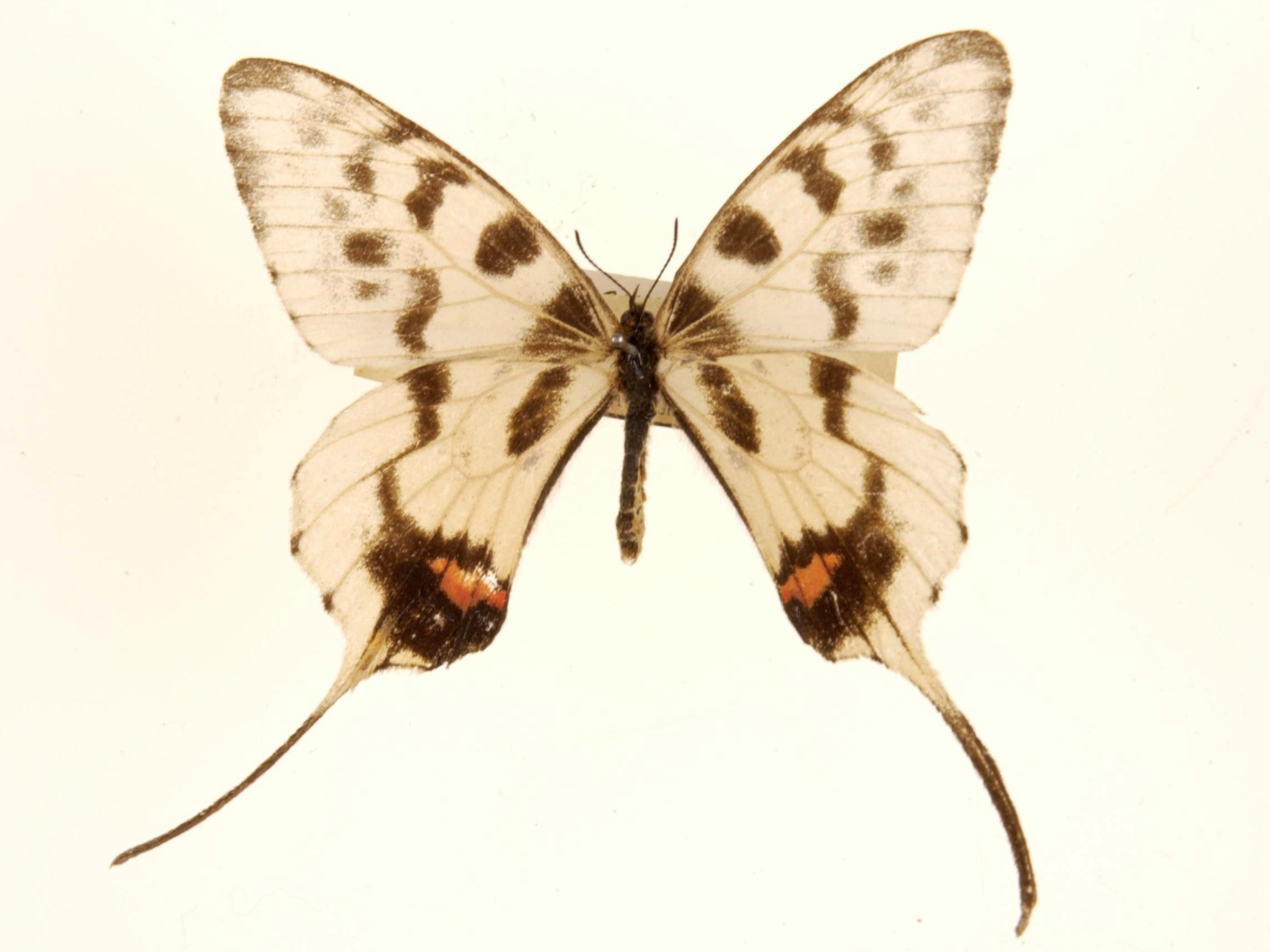
Male museum specimen from China
- Subspecies manchurica (Bang-Haas (i.l.) van Rosen, 1929 (North China: South Manchuria)
  - Form roseni Bryk, 1932 gen. vern.
  - Form manschuricus van Rosen gen. aest.
  - Form cellopura
  - Form posterior exsubcostalis (!) Eisner, 1974
  - Form binaria Bryk
  - Form minusculus Eisner, 1962
  - Form nigricans Eisner, 1962
  - Form minima Eisner, 1962
- Subspecies amurensis Staudinger, 1892 (East U.S.S.R., Amurland-Ussuri)
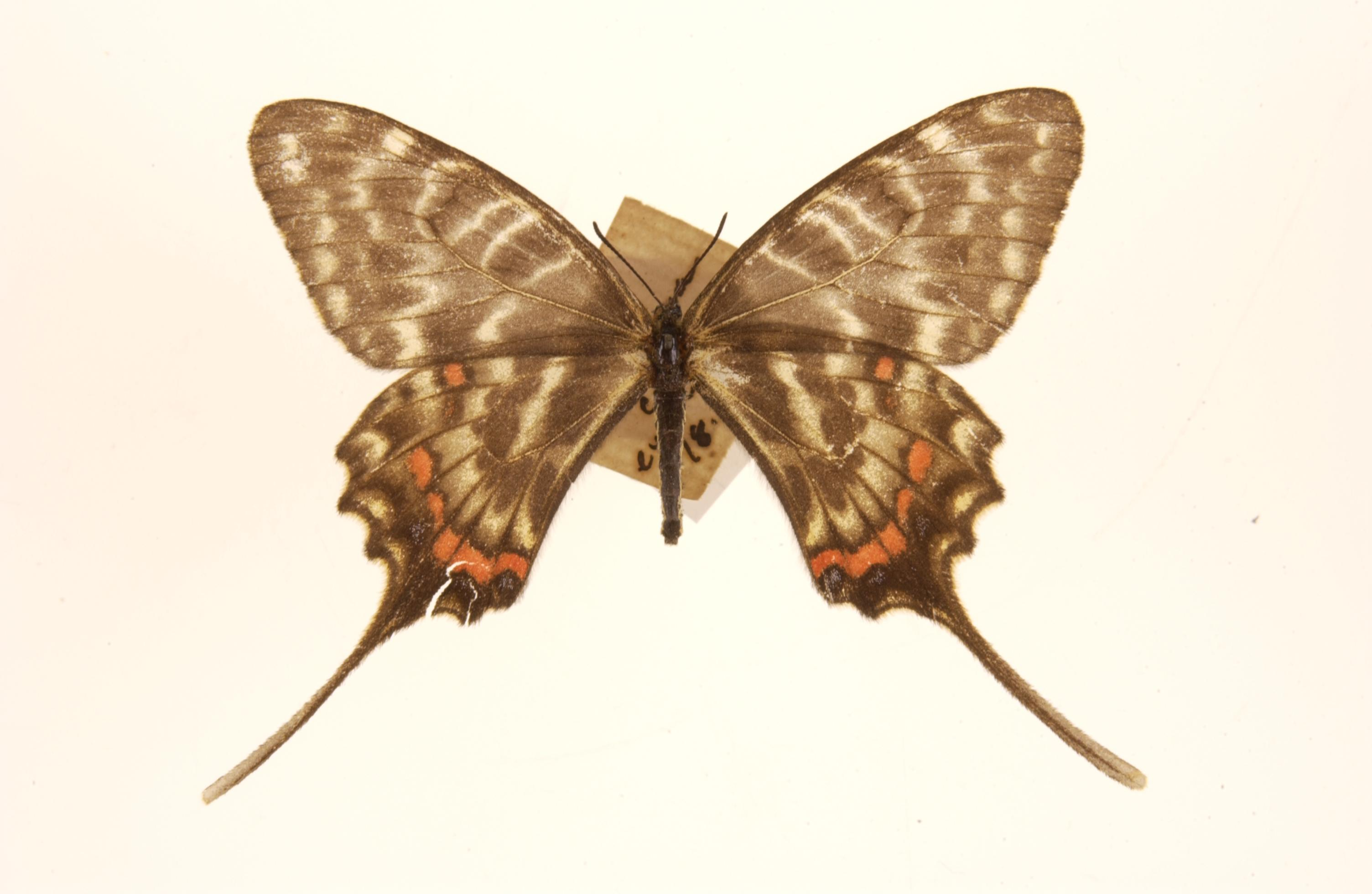
Subspecies amurensis, female, Amur, Russia

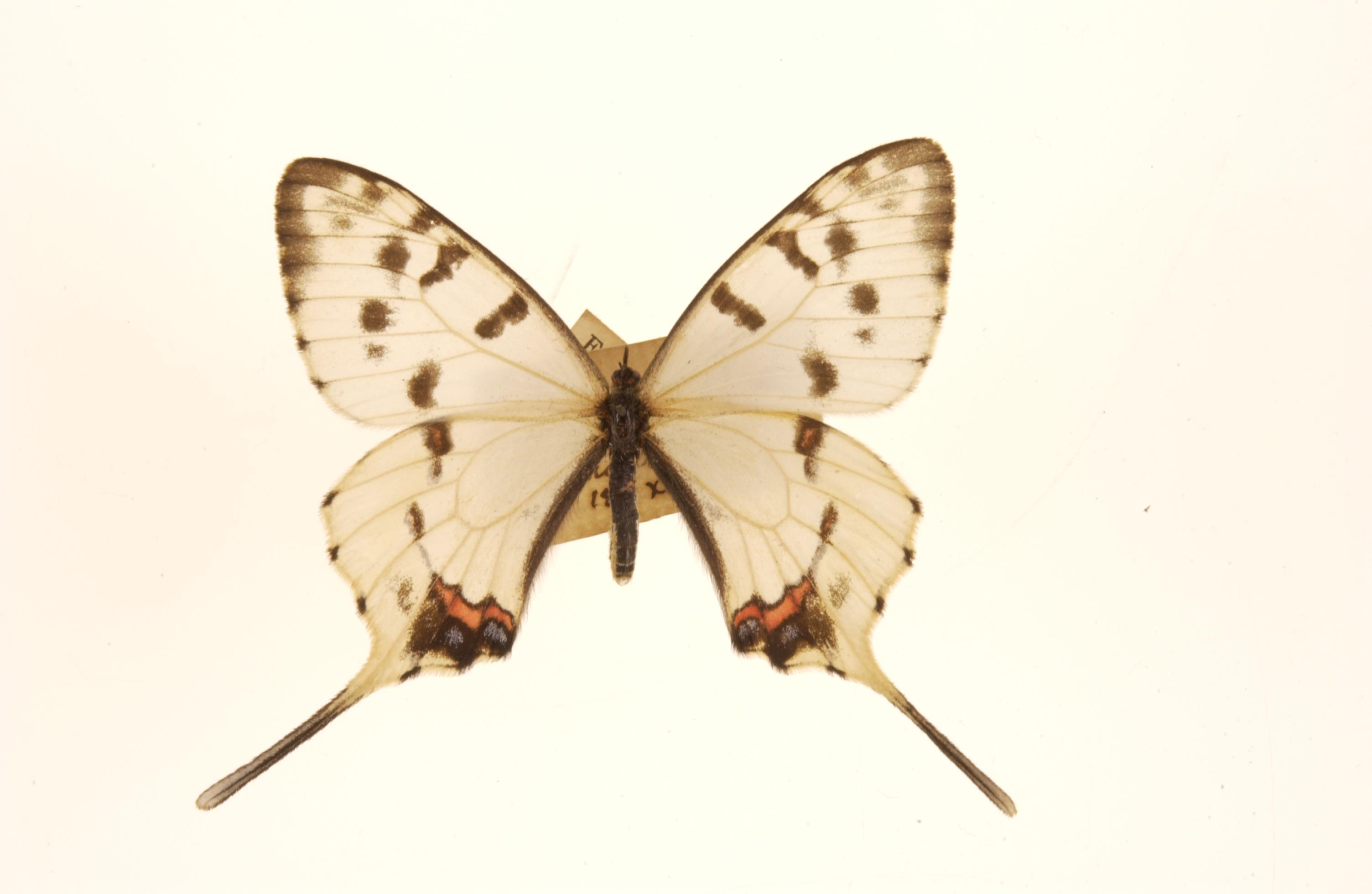
Subspecies amurensis, male, Amur
  - Form telemachus Staudinger, 1892 gen. vern.
  - Form amurensis Staudingers gen. vest.
  - Form minusculus Eisner, 1962
- Subspecies eisneri Bryk 1932 North East Korea (probably amurensis) gen. vern. not described.
  - Form eisneri Bryk gen. aest.
  - Form binaria Eisner, 1962
  - Form unaria Eisner, 1962 !
- Subspecies koreana Fixsen, 1887 (melanogramma Bryk, 1846) Korea
  - Form fixseni Staudinger, 1892 gen. vern.
  - Form koreanus Fix. gen. aest.
  - Form grayi Fixsen, 1887
  - Form grundi Eisner, 1962
  - Form binaria Eisner, 1962
  - Form strandi Bryk 1913
  - Form flavomaculata Eisner, 1962
  - Form minusculus Eisner, 1962
  - Form magna Eisner
  - Form rubrocatenata Eisner
  - Form posteriorsubmarginalisinterrupta (!) Eisner, 1974
- Subspecies montela Gray, 1852 (telamon Donovan, 1798: hoenei Hering), (Central and North China - Beijing, Nanjing, Zhenjiang, Shanghai)
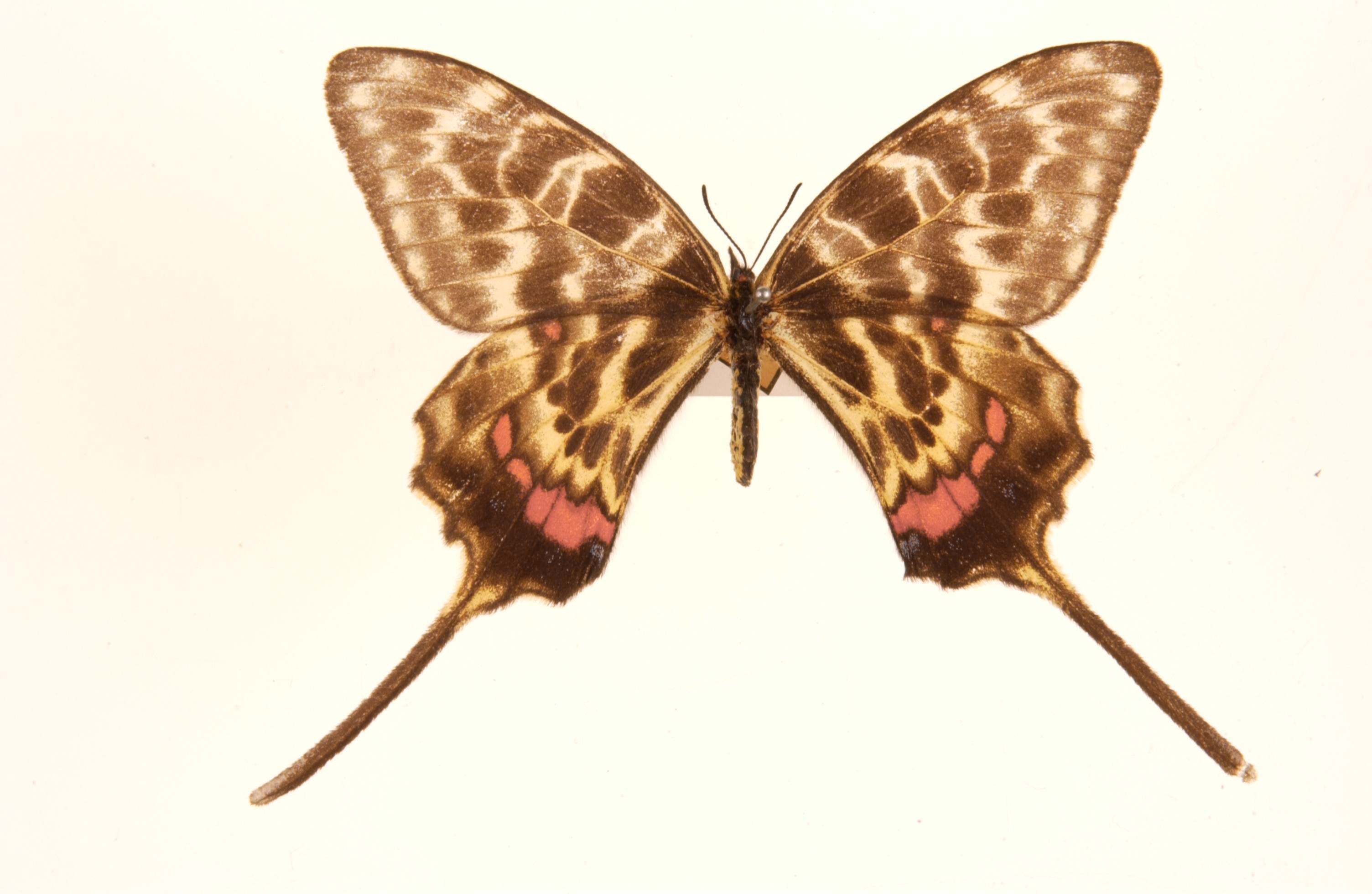
Nominate subspecies, female

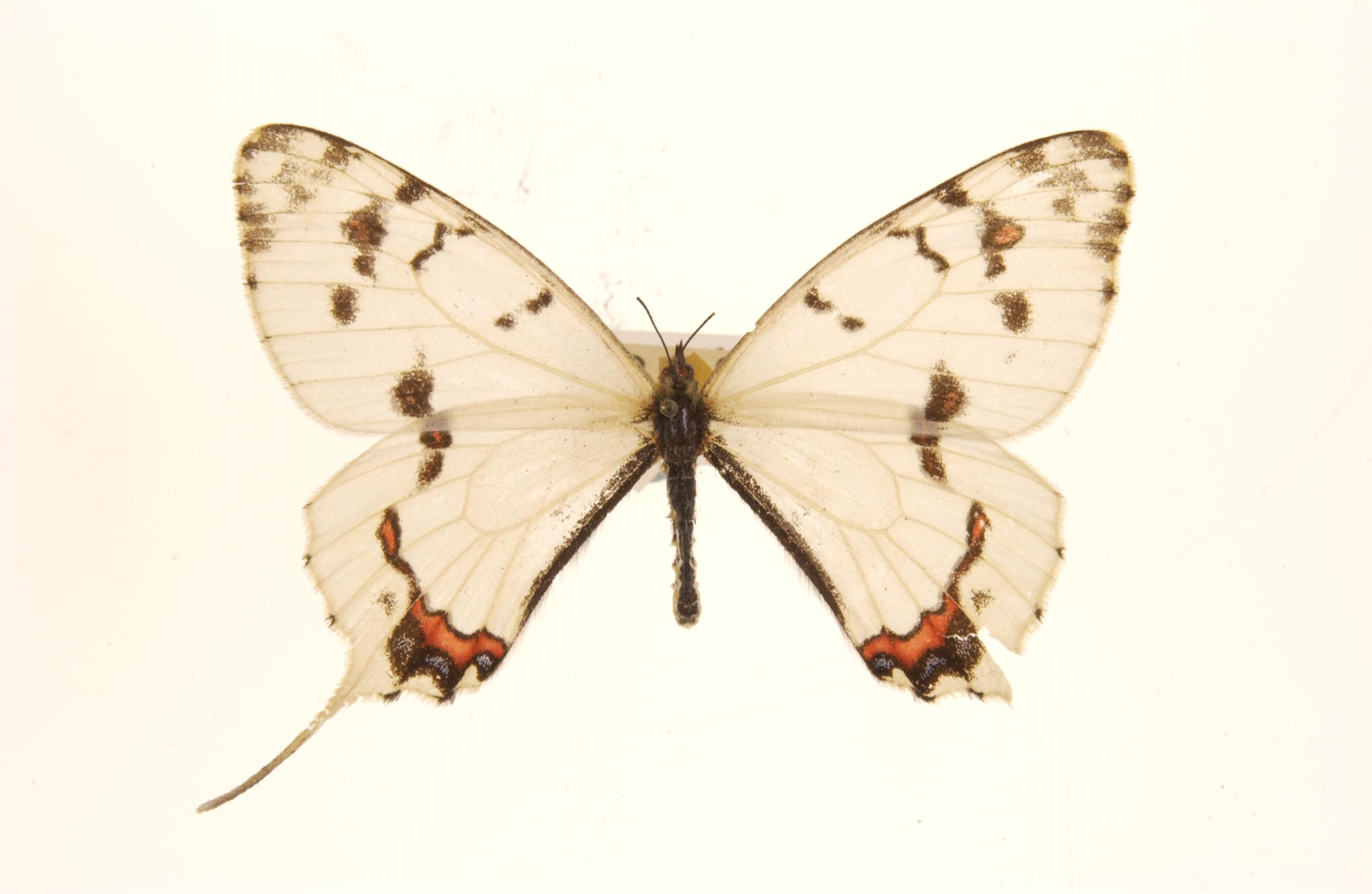
Nominate subspecies, male
  - Form strandi Bryk, 1913
  - Form telmona Gray 1852 gen. vern. (hoenei Bryk, 1932)
  - Form telmononula Bryk
  - Form ruth Eisner, 1962
  - Form montela Gray, 1852 gen. aest.
  - Form cellopura Eisner, 1954
  - Form cellopurissima Eisner, 1954
  - Form elegantissima Eisner, 1954
  - Form flavomaculata Eisner, 1954
  - Form miniuscula Eisner, 1962
  - Form binaria Eisner, 1962
  - Form nigricans Eisner, 1962
  - Form eva Bryk and Eisner, 1935
  - Form absurdus Bryk, 1913 (West China, South Shandong, Lau shan, Tianjin)
- Subspecies elegans Bryk, 1913 (leechi Rothschild, 1918) (West China)
  - Form telmona Gray gen. vern.
  - Form elegans Bryk gen. aest.
  - Form strandi Bryk, 1913
  - Form leechi Rothschild, 1918
  - Form cressoni Reakirt
- Subspecies anderssoni Bryk, 1941 (Central China: Hubei anderssoni Bryk, gen. aest.
- Subspecies magnus Fruhstorfer, 1913 (South China: Jiangxi, Liujiang
- Subspecies kansuensis Eisner, 1962 (China: Gansu (i.e., Kansu), Qinling, Sichuan)
- Subspecies shantungensis Hering, 1935 (China: Shandong (i.e., Shantung))
  - Form cellopurissima Eisner, 1954
  - Form binaria Eisner, 1962
  - Form rubrocatenata Eisner, 1962
  - Form quadripicta Eisner, 1962
  - Form elegantissima Eisner, 1954

== Notes ==
- monobasic = founded containing a single species, same as "monotypic" if no more species are added
- gen. vern. = generatio vernalis (spring generation)
- gen. aest. = generatio aestiva (summer generation)
- gen. vest. = genetically determined vestigial form
- (!) = nomen collectivum, a nomenclatural/descriptigeneratio vernalisve term used by Curt Eisner in a taxonomic sense (infrasubspecific)
- i.l. = in litteris, correspondence, not published
