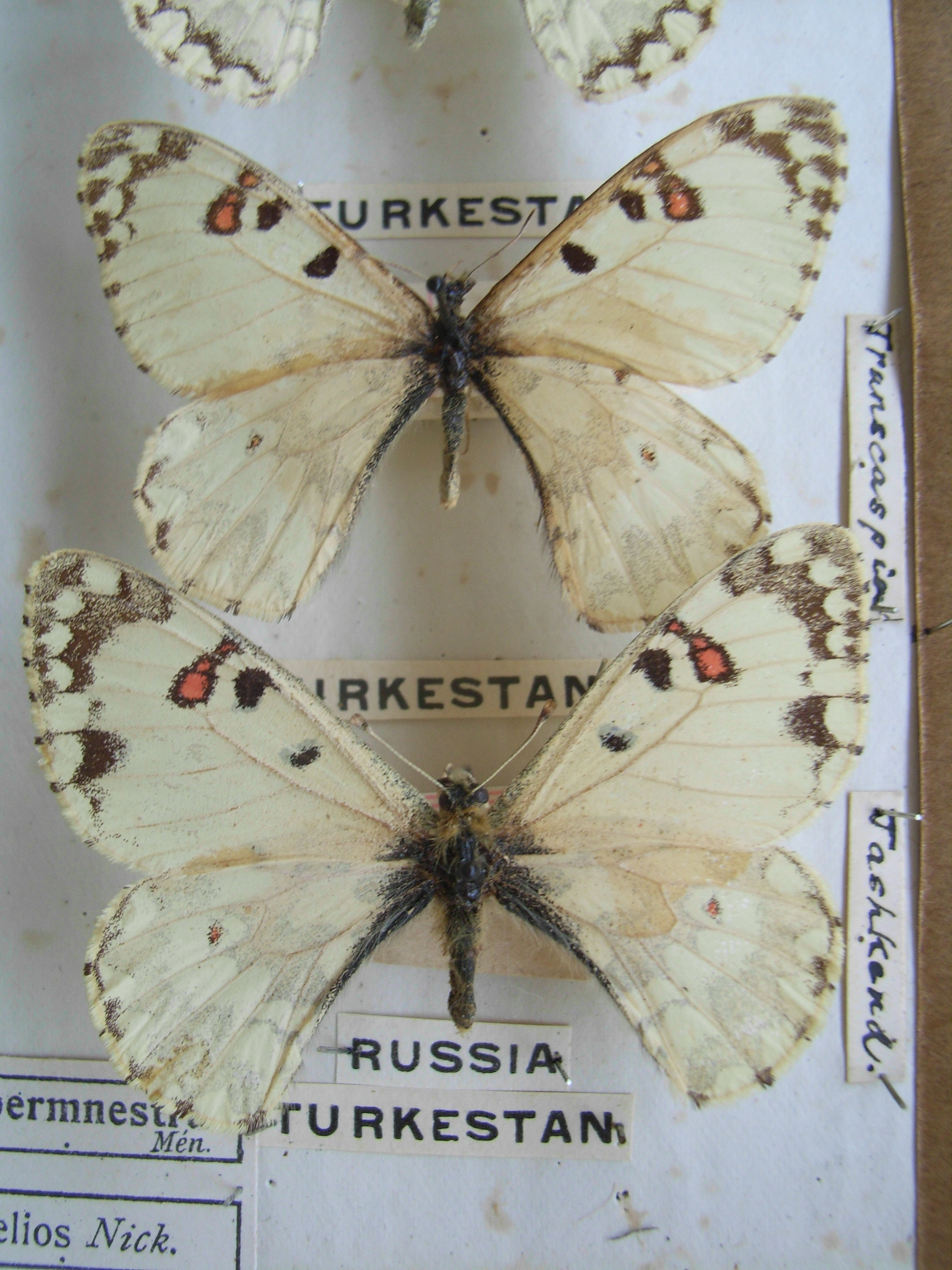
- Hypermnestra helios

Scientific classification
- Kingdom: Animalia
- Phylum: Arthropoda
- Class: Insecta
- Order: Lepidoptera
- Family: Papilionidae
- Subfamily: Parnassiinae
- Tribe: Parnassiini; Duponchel, 1835

Genera
- See text

= Parnassiini =

Tribe of butterflies

The Parnassiini are a tribe of swallowtail butterflies.

== Genera ==
The tribe is thought to consist of two genera:

- Hypermnestra
- Parnassius
