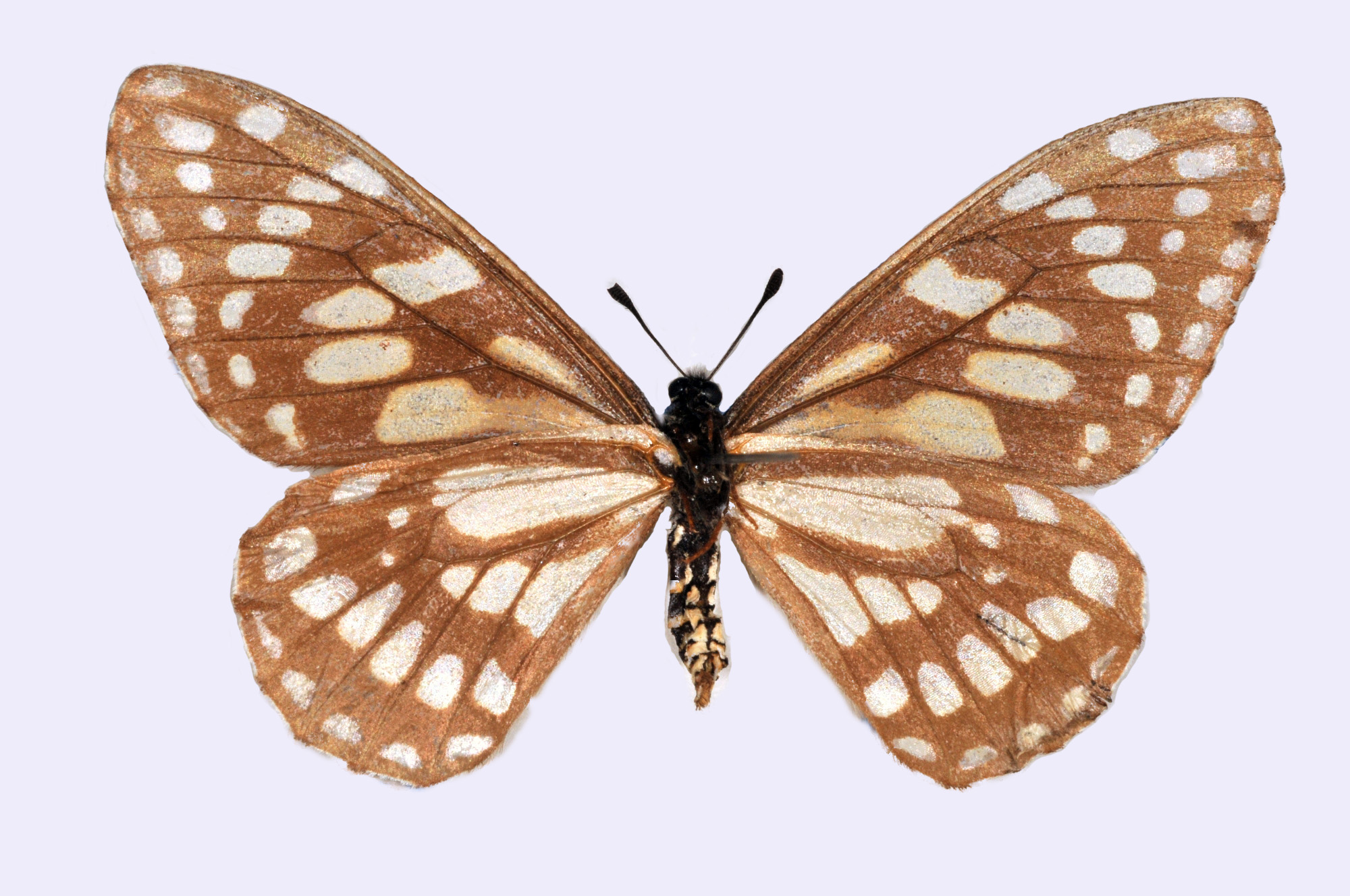

Conservation status
- Endangered (IUCN 3.1)

Scientific classification
- Kingdom: Animalia
- Phylum: Arthropoda
- Clade: Pancrustacea
- Class: Insecta
- Order: Lepidoptera
- Family: Papilionidae
- Subfamily: Baroniinae; Bryk, 1913
- Genus: Baronia; Salvin, 1893
- Species: B. brevicornis

Binomial name
- Baronia brevicornis Salvin, 1893

= Baronia =

Species of butterfly

Baronia brevicornis, commonly known as the short-horned baronia, is a species of butterfly in the monotypic genus Baronia and is placed in a subfamily of its own, the Baroniinae, a sister group of the remainder of the swallowtail butterflies. It is endemic to a very small area of Mexico, where the distribution is patchy and restricted.

The genus is named after Oscar Theodor Baron who collected the first specimen in the Sierra Madre region of Mexico. The species was then described by Salvin.

Morphological characteristics include an abdominal scent organ in females.

Baronia is unique among swallowtail butterflies or their relatives in having a Vachellia species, Vachellia campechiana (synonym Acacia cochliacantha, family Fabaceae) as its larval food plant.

== Taxonomy ==
Baronia brevicornis is of particular importance due to its relict nature and uncertain relationship to other subfamilies such as the Parnassiinae. It is now considered to represent the monotypic subfamily Baroniinae. The butterfly was considered as the most primitive extant papilionid taxon and shares some features with the fossil genus Praepapilio, and a comprehensive 2018 molecular phylogeny suggests that they are the sister group of the remainder of the Papilionidae.

=== Subspecies ===
- B. b. brevicornis
- B. b. rufodiscalis
