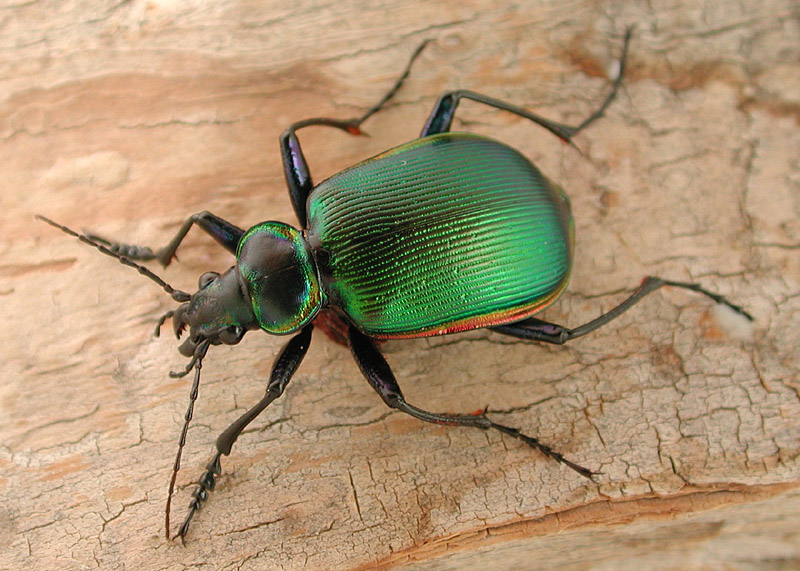

Scientific classification
- Kingdom: Animalia
- Phylum: Arthropoda
- Clade: Pancrustacea
- Class: Insecta
- Order: Coleoptera
- Suborder: Adephaga
- Family: Carabidae
- Genus: Calosoma
- Species: C. scrutator

Binomial name
- Calosoma scrutator (Fabricius, 1775)

Synonyms
- Carabus scrutator Fabricius, 1775

= Calosoma scrutator =

Species of beetle

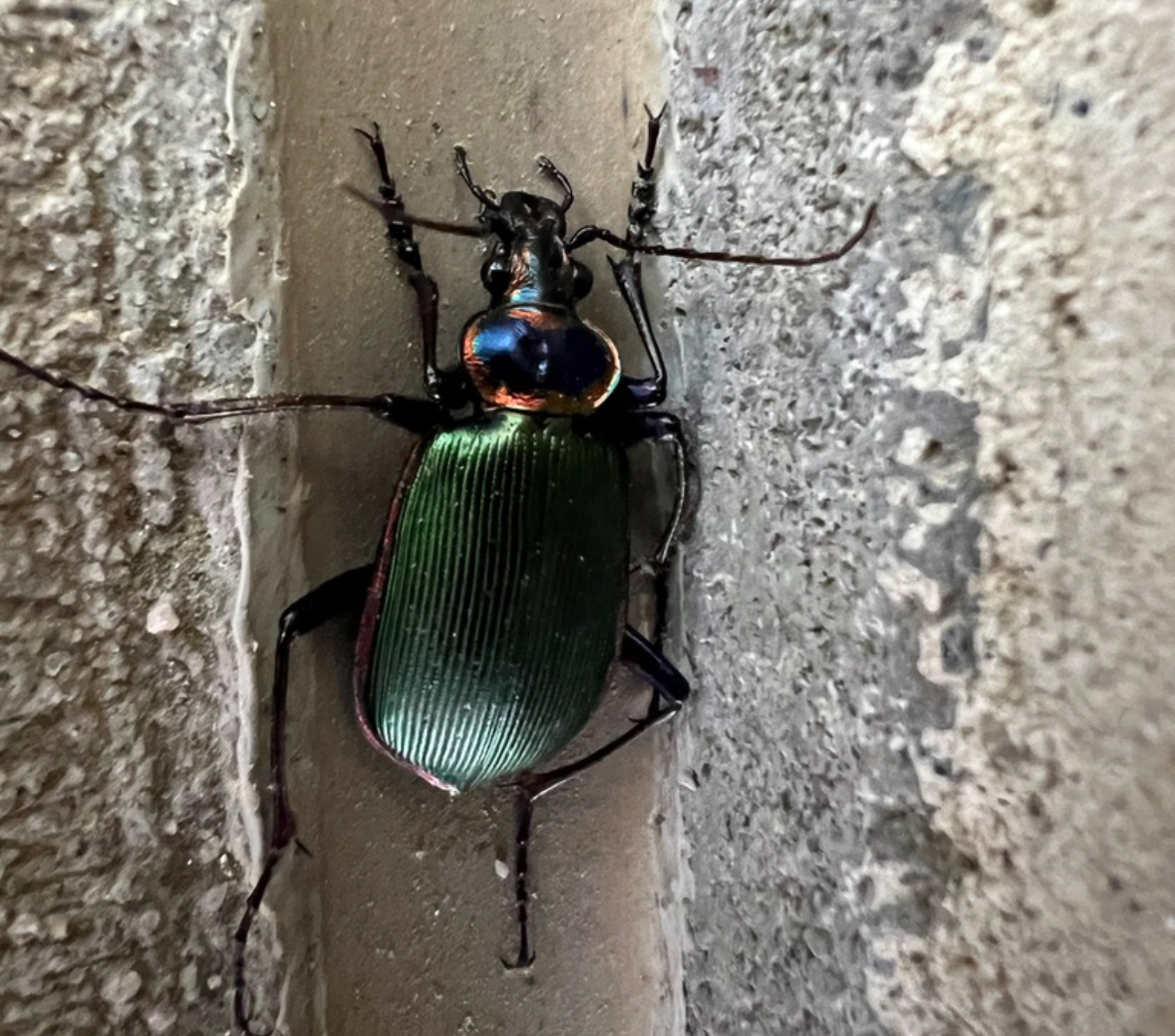
Calosoma scrutator

Calosoma scrutator, commonly known as the fiery searcher and caterpillar hunter, is a species of ground beetle belonging to the genus Calosoma. This beetle can be as large as 35 millimetres (1.4 in) long, and is hence among the largest of the ground beetles found in North America. The distribution of this species is relatively widespread, and is common in North America. The adult beetle is known to excrete a foul-smelling oil when it is handled. The oil has been described as smelling similar to rotten milk or rancid olive oil.

It was originally described in Virginia by Johan Christian Fabricius in 1775. It is a predatory beetle and also happens to be predatorial in its larval stage as well. Their varying colors and metallic shine make them very intriguing to those who spend time collecting different types of bugs. They are found mostly in North America along the east coast but have been found in Mexico, Venezuela, and Guatemala. Adults eat caterpillars and other worms, but most notably the forest tent caterpillar (Mala-cosoma disstria) and cankerworms. This fact gives Calosoma scrutator the nickname of "Caterpillar Hunter". These beetles are very good predators of agricultural pests such as spongy moth larvae. Predators that like to snack on the fiery searcher beetle include skunks, birds, raccoons, foxes, and toads.

== Appearance ==
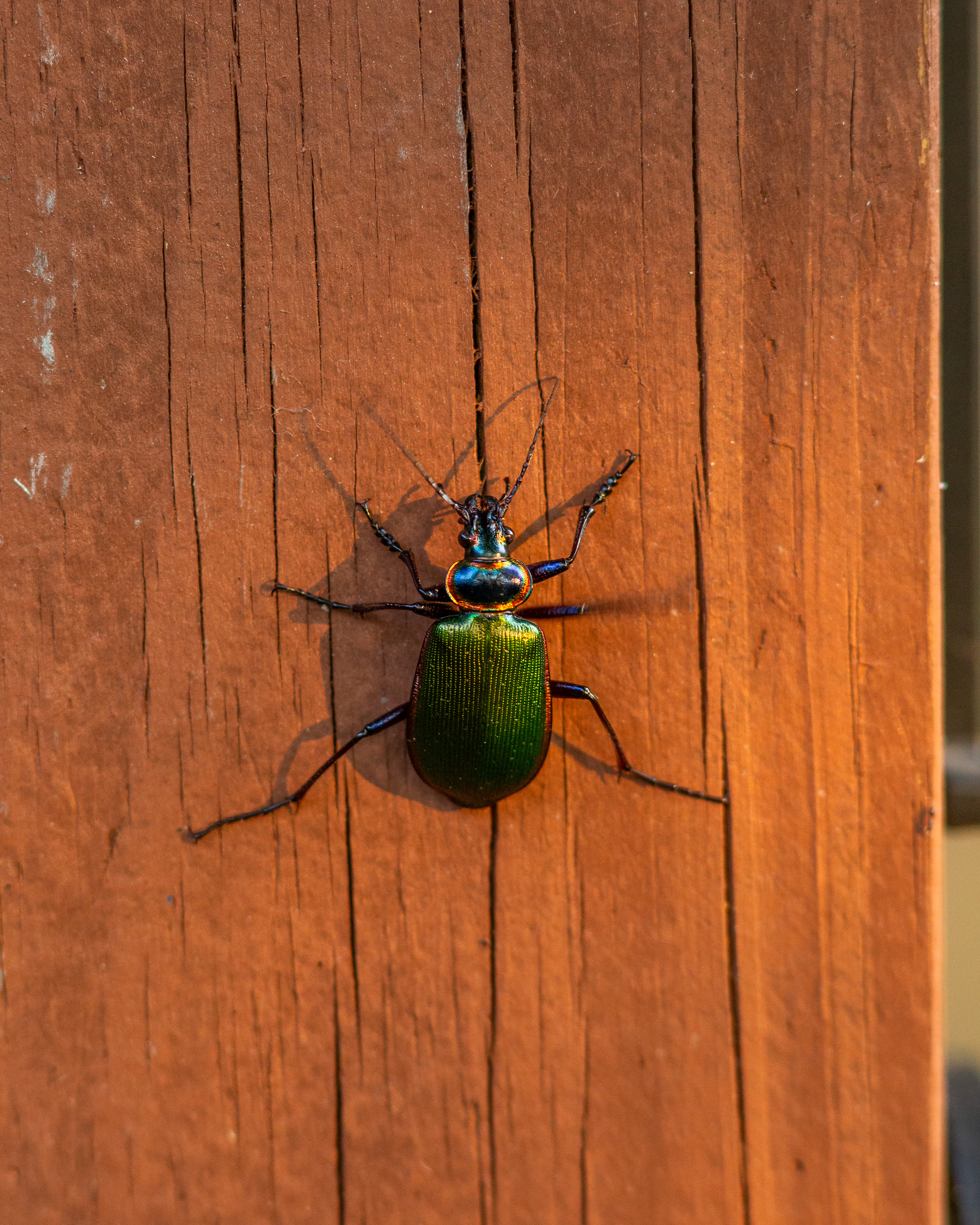
Calosoma scrutator in Arkansas, USA

C. scrutator is a large beetle who belongs to the family Carabidae (Ground Beetles). It is very vibrant and known for its bright green abdomen which has a slightly reddish-gold border/outline. Other notable features are the blueish-black thorax and its black head and legs. In addition to its metallic and shiny appearance, which gives C. scrutator its nickname, "Fiery Searcher", it is one of the largest ground beetles, growing up to 35mm (1.4 inches) long. Along with its vibrant colors, C. scrutator has very distinctive mandibles which allow it to be easy to spot when amongst other ground beetles.

== Life cycle ==
The life cycle of C. scrutator can be broken down into 4 stages, egg, larva, pupa, and adult. The female Fiery Searchers lay eggs usually in the months of May-July. The eggs are laid in the soil and eventually hatch into larvae. Once it has hatched, C. scrutator becomes a predatory larva much like its adult form still consuming the same types of soft bodied larvae. Once it has gone through the last stage of being a larva, which takes about 9 days to a week, it burrows into the soil and prepares for pupation. Once it becomes a pupa, it takes 10-15 days to become an adult. The pupae are usually white at the beginning of the pupal stage but as they grow older, they gain coloration. Once they are adults they can live up to 4 years. The entire life cycle of C. scrutator can be completed within a year.

== Behavior and habitat ==
They are primarily nocturnal hunters and are most active during the spring. During the winter, they hide in leaf litter and underneath leaves and bark. Although these beetles can in fact climb trees, they are still considered ground beetles because that is where they spend most of their time. They are very good to have around a garden or in an agricultural scene because they feed on pests such as the tent caterpillars and gypsy moth larvae, which heavily defoliate trees and crops while they feed during their larval stages. C. scrutator is usually found in open fields or garden areas because they give them space to hunt, but they have also been known to visit deciduous forests and urbanized areas. Although they are mainly found along the East coast if found in the United States, they are widespread and found everywhere in North America, where they tend to face their aforementioned predators such as skunks, birds, and raccoons. They are also frequently found in Mexico, Venezuela, Guatemala, and Central America as well. It is also helpful to the agriculture of the Americas as it fends off pests from gardens and fields.
