= Ismene pelusia =

Scientific classification
- Domain: Eukaryota
- Kingdom: Animalia
- Phylum: Arthropoda
- Class: Insecta
- Order: Lepidoptera
- Family: Crambidae
- Subfamily: Crambinae
- Tribe: incertae sedis
- Genus: Ismene; Savigny, 1816
- Species: I. pelusia

Binomial name
- Ismene pelusia Savigny, 1816

Species of moth

Ismene is a genus of moths of the family Crambidae. It contains only one species, Ismene pelusia, which is found in Egypt.
