= List of butterflies of Europe (Papilionidae) =

This is a list of the butterflies of family Papilionidae, or the "swallowtails", which are found in Europe. This family of large and beautiful butterflies is poorly represented with only 14 species found within European borders, out of a total of 552 species of swallowtails found throughout the world. It is a part of List of the butterflies of Europe.

== Checklist ==
=== Subfamily Parnassinae ===
- Southern festoon, Zerynthia polyxena
- Italian festoon, Zerynthia cassandra
- Spanish festoon, Zerynthia rumina
- Eastern festoon, Allancastria cerisyi
- Allancastria caucasica
- Allancastria cretica
- False Apollo, Archon apollinus
- Apollo, Parnassius apollo
- Small Apollo, Parnassius phoebus
- Clouded Apollo, Parnassius mnemosyne
- Parnassius nordmanni
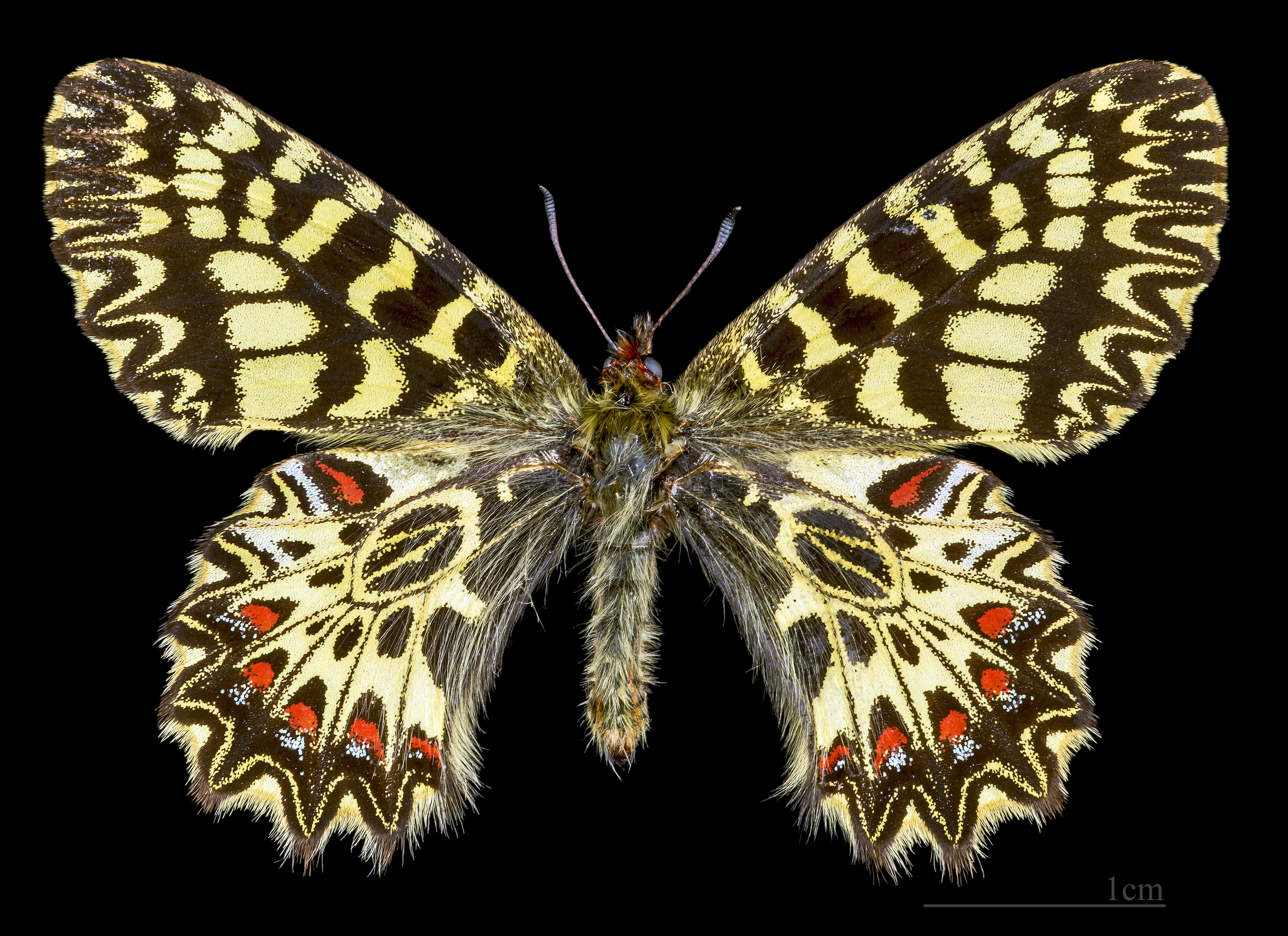
Southern festoon
Zerynthia polyxena

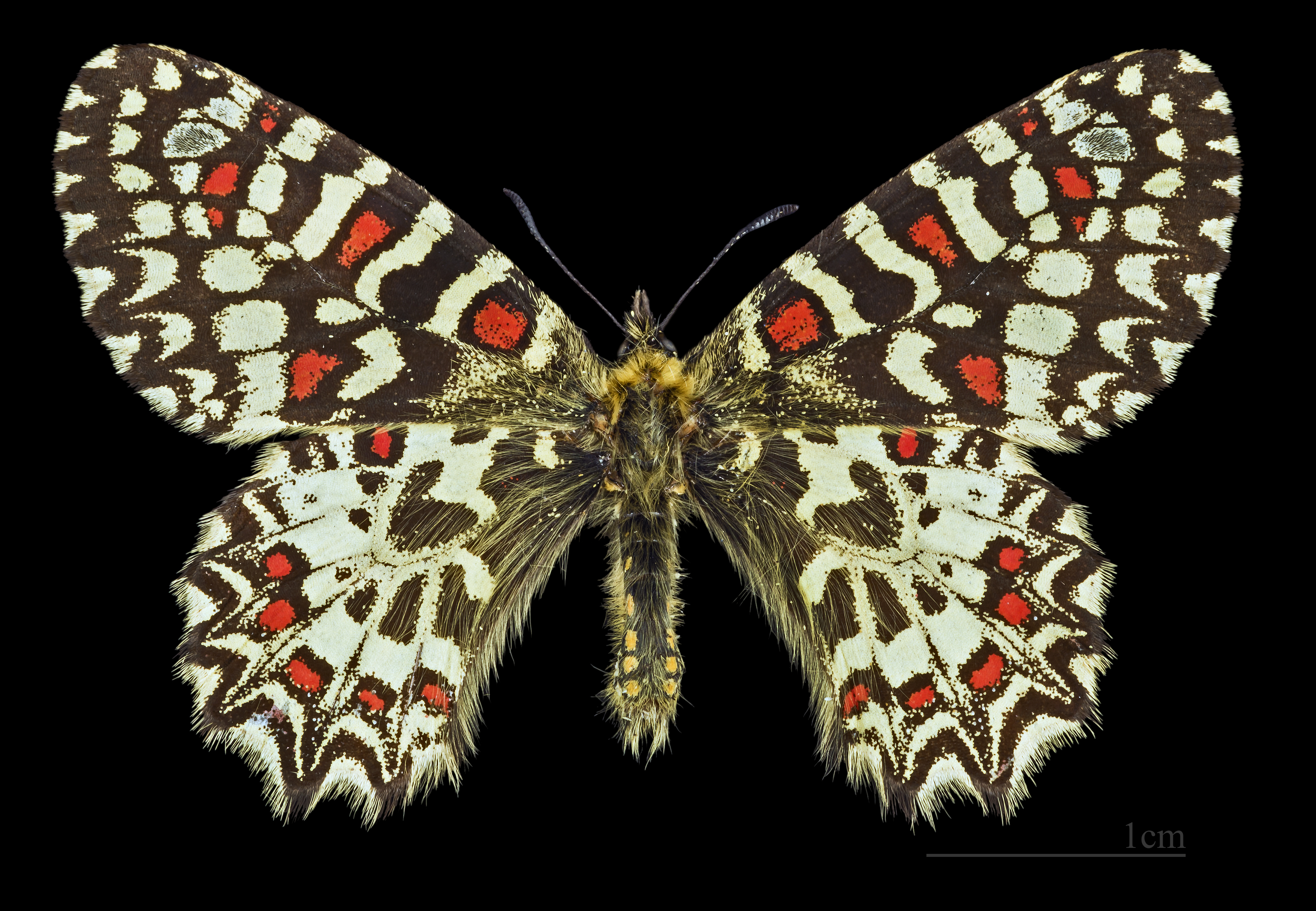
Spanish festoon
Zerynthia rumina

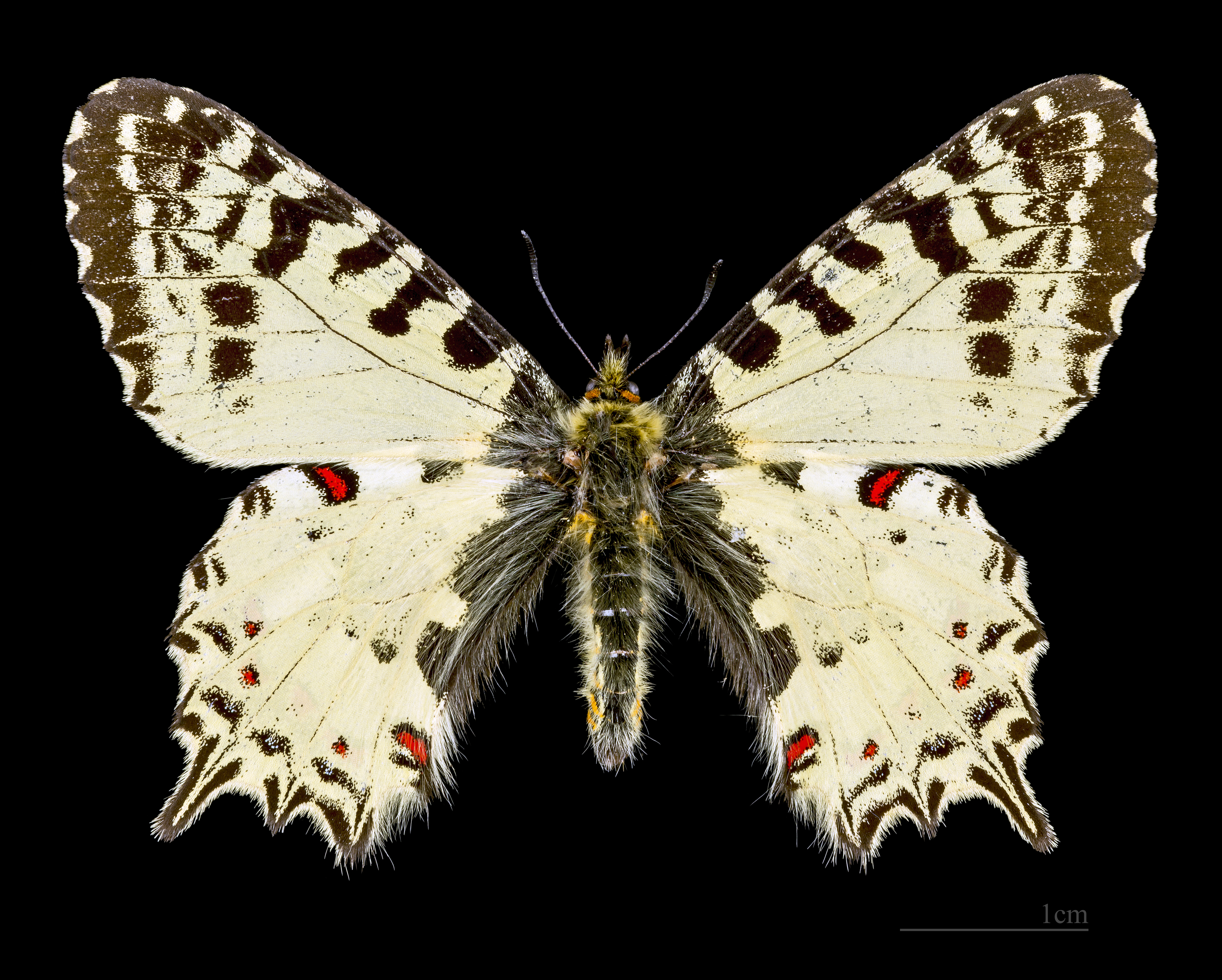
Eastern festoon
Allancastria cerisyi

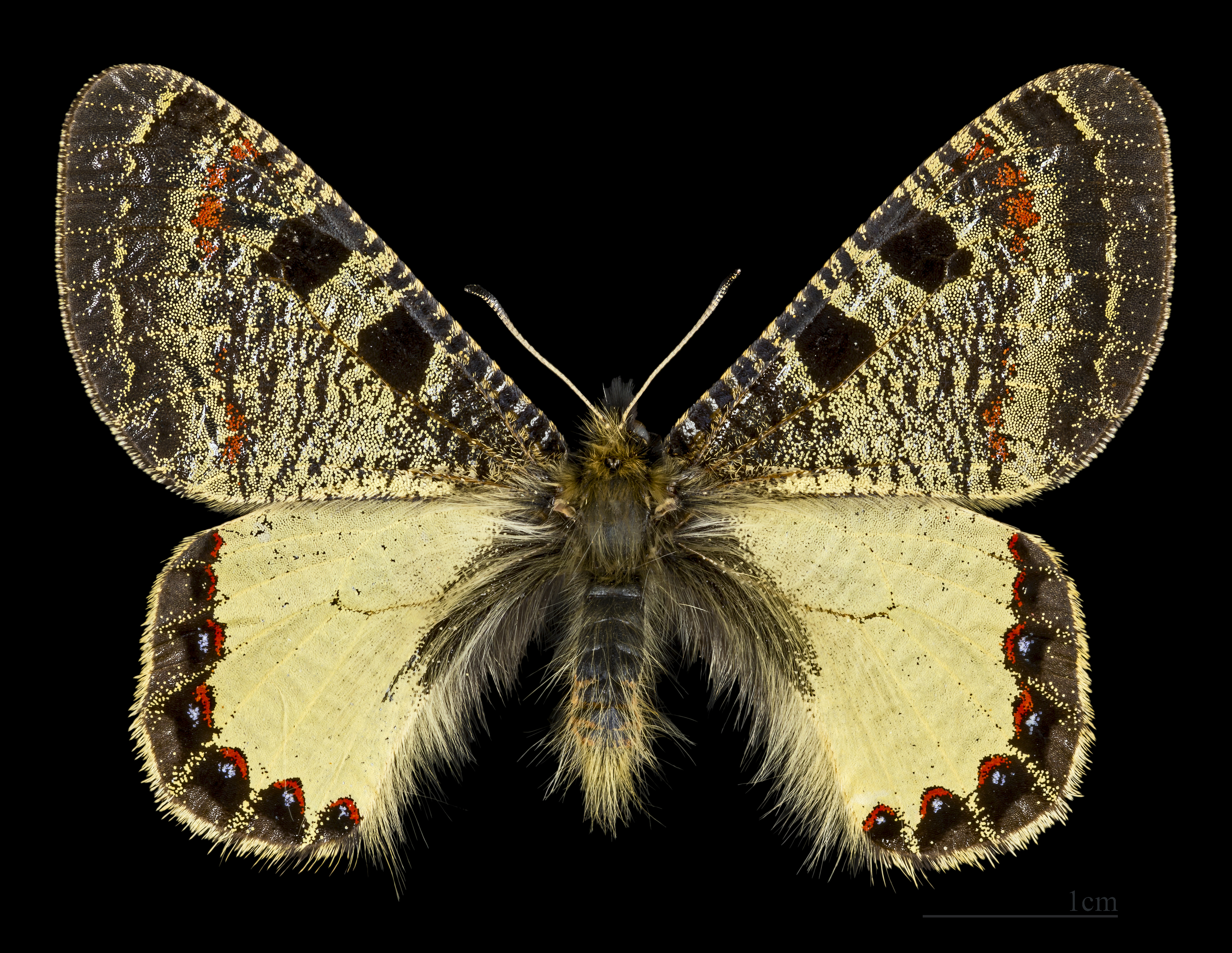
False Apollo
Archon apollinus

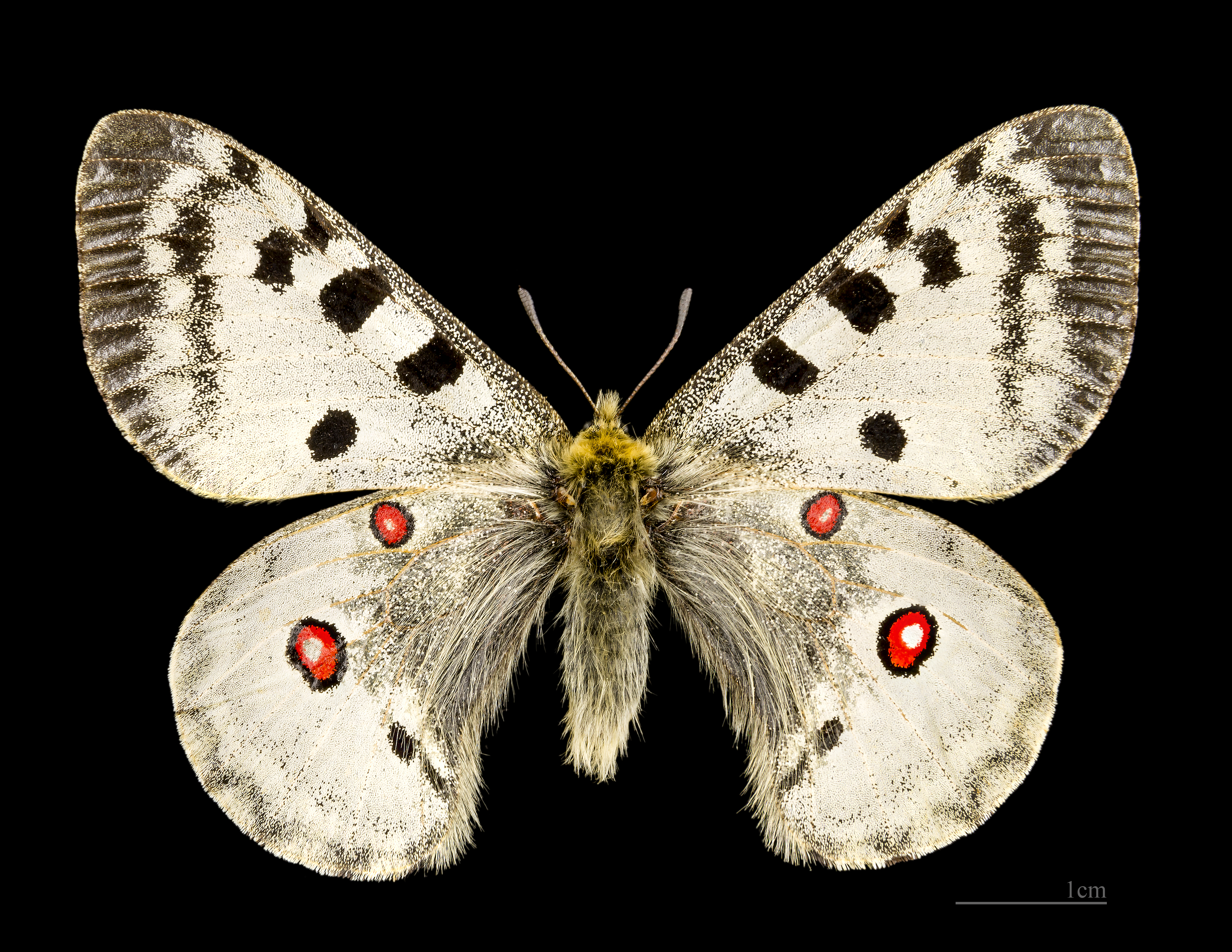
Apollo
Parnassius apollo

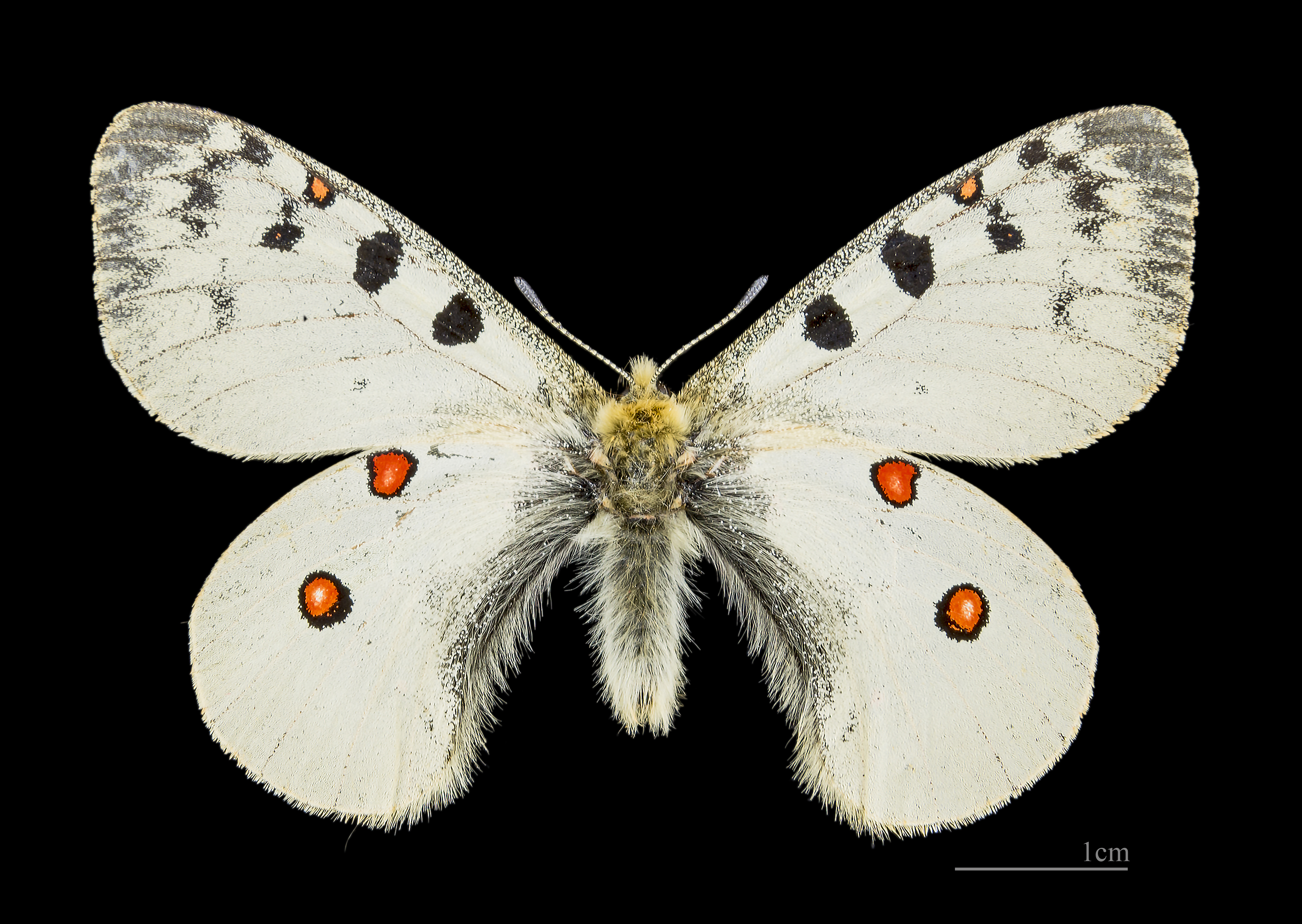
Small Apollo
Parnassius phoebus

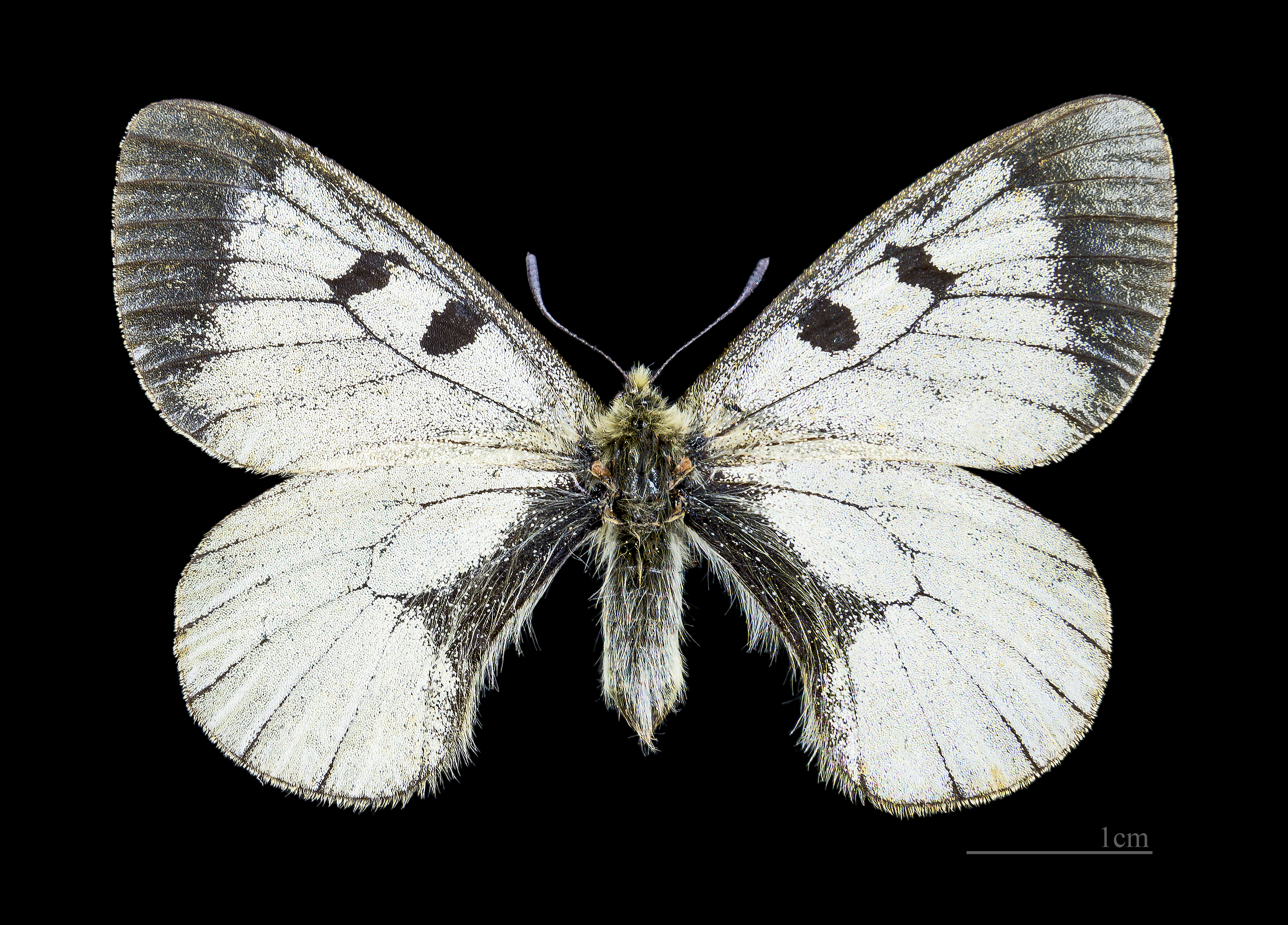
Clouded Apollo
Parnassius mnemosyne

=== Subfamily Papilioninae ===
- Old World swallowtail, Papilio machaon
- Sahara swallowtail, Papilio saharae
- Corsican swallowtail, Papilio hospiton
- Southern swallowtail, Papilio alexanor
- Scarce swallowtail, Iphiclides podalirius
- Iberian scarce swallowtail, Iphiclides feisthamelii
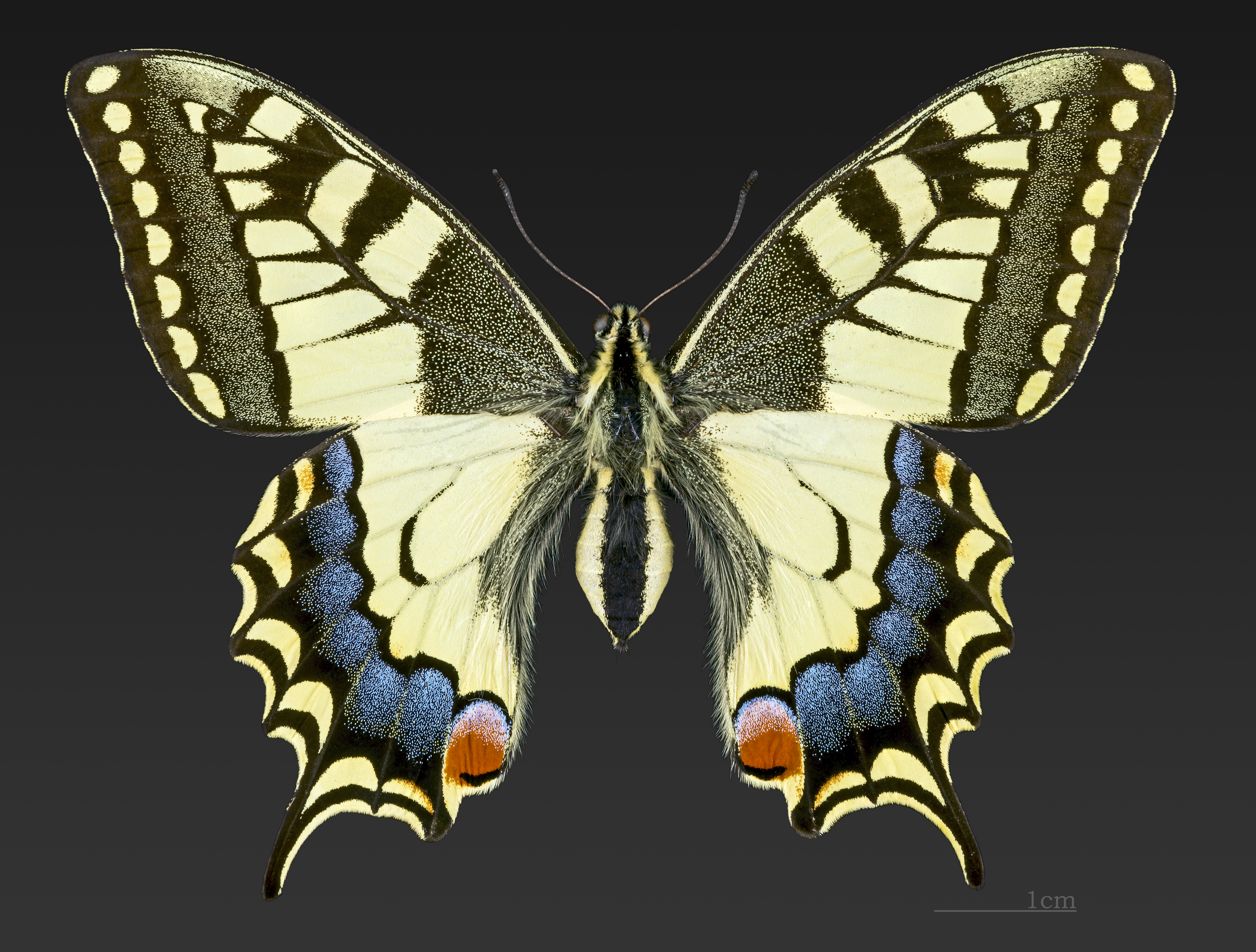
Swallowtail
Papilio machaon

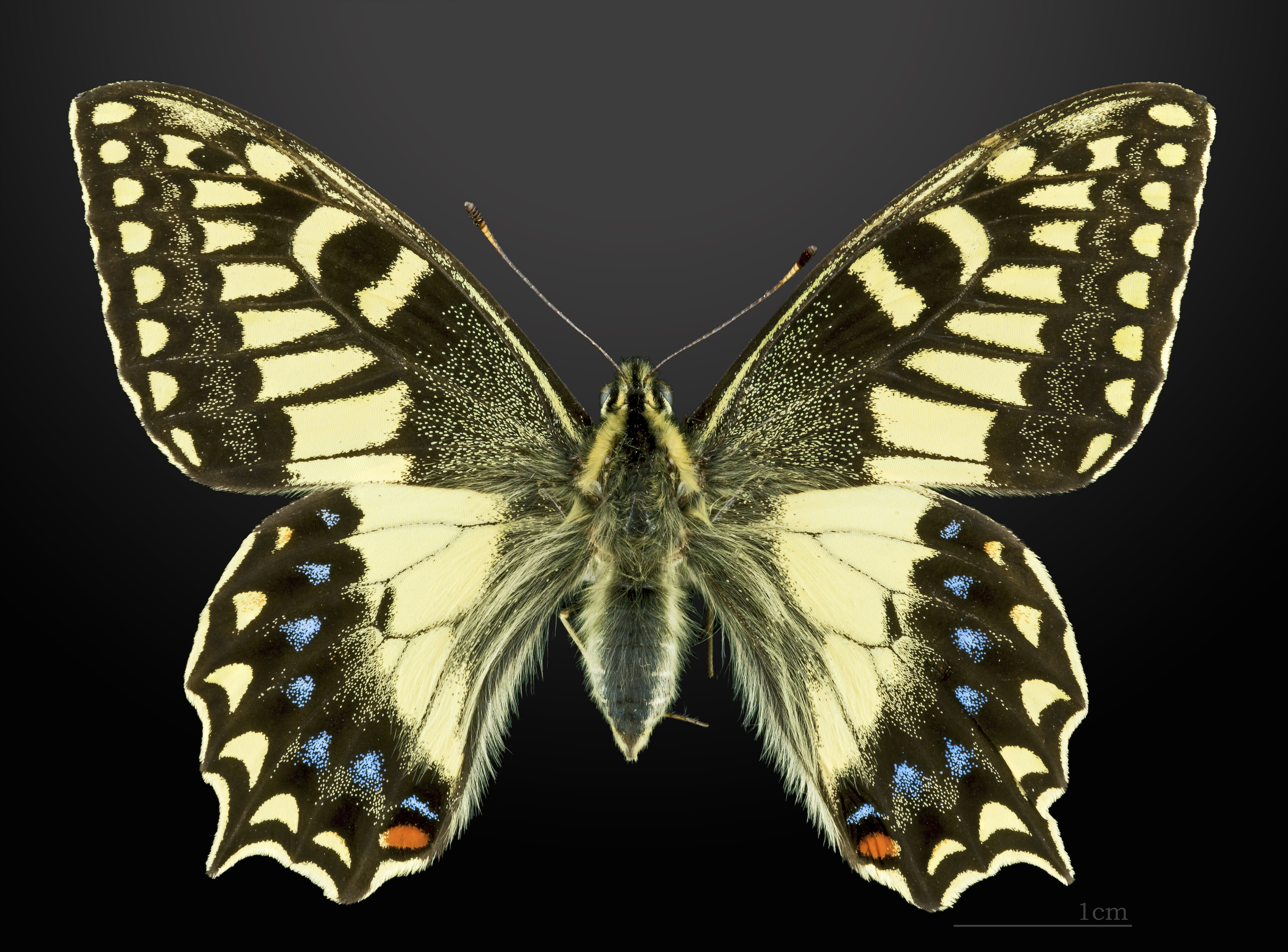
Corsican swallowtail
Papilio hospiton

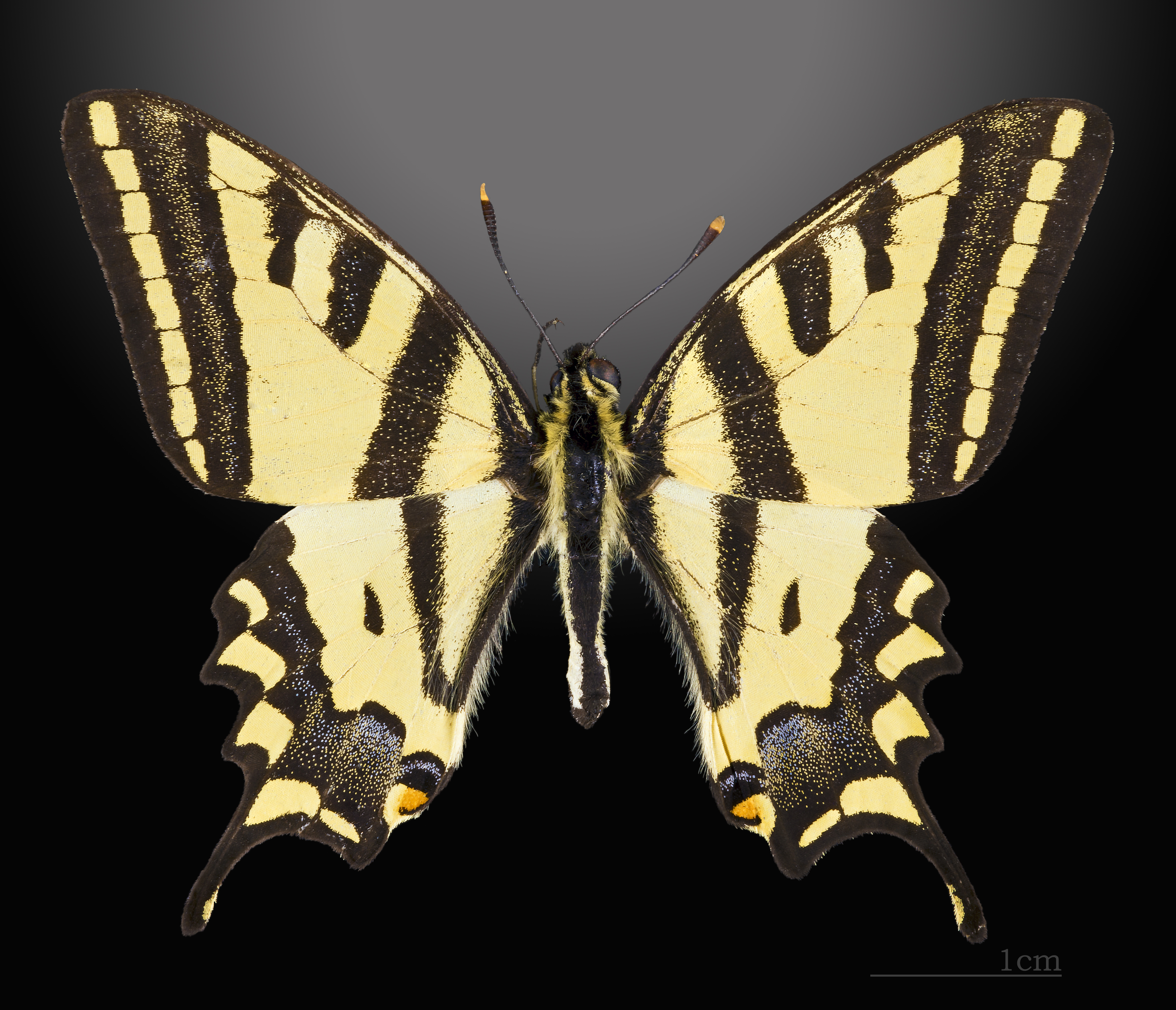
Southern swallowtail
Papilio alexanor

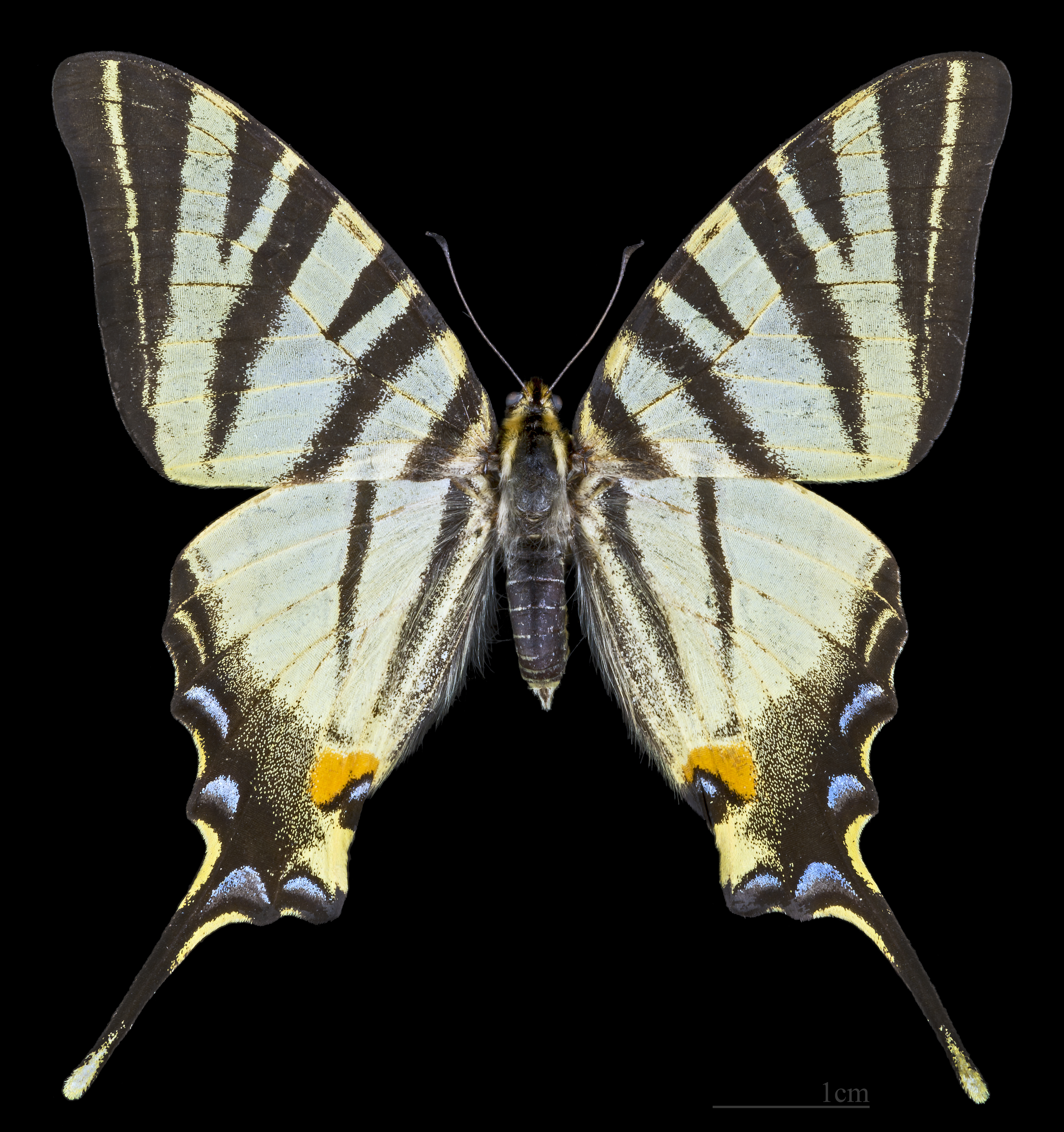
Scarce swallowtail
Iphiclides podalirius

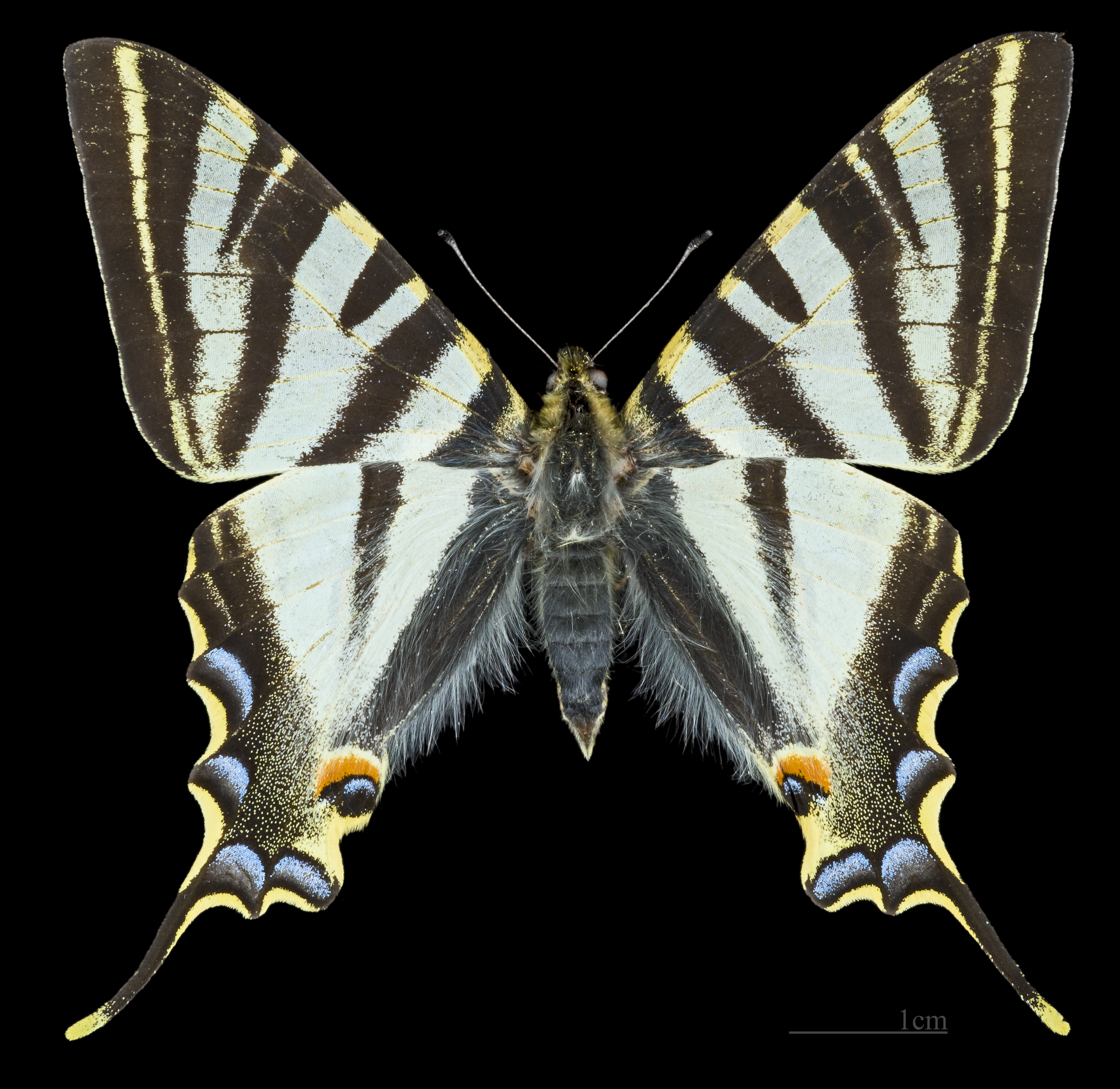
Iberian scarce swallowtail
Iphiclides feisthamelii

== See also ==
- List of butterflies of Europe (Pieridae)
