= Southern swallowtail =

Southern swallowtail may refer to:

- Iphiclides feisthamelii, a black-and-white butterfly found in Spain, Portugal, Morocco, Algeria, and Tunisia
- Papilio alexanor, a black-and-yellow butterfly found in Southern Europe and Western to Central Asia
