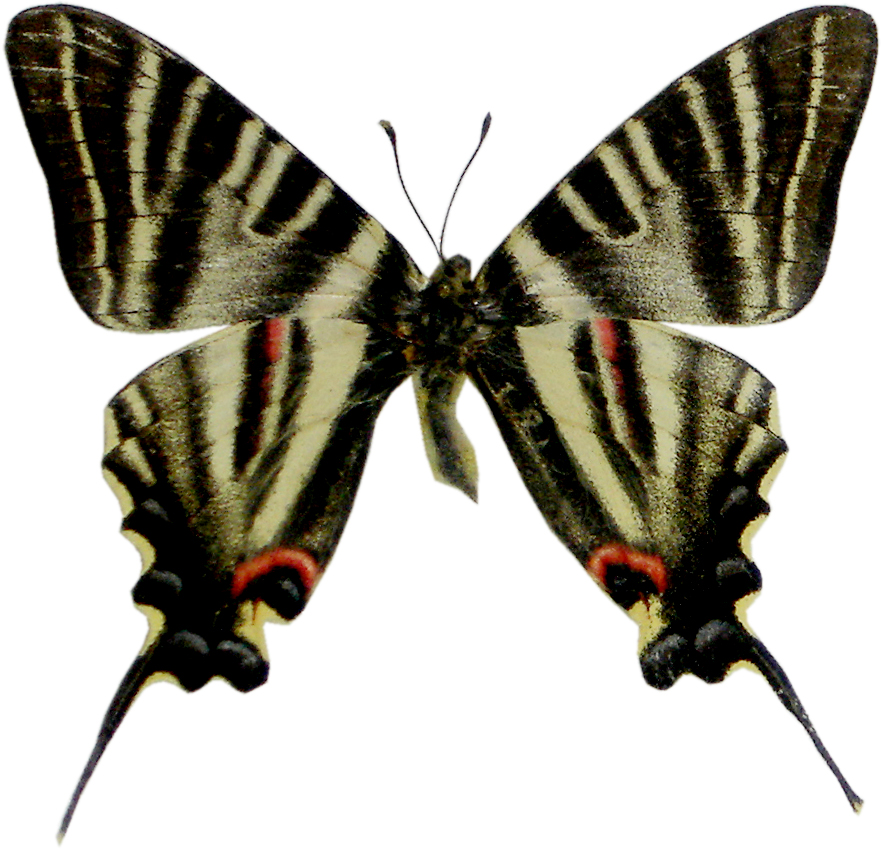
- Male

Scientific classification
- Kingdom: Animalia
- Phylum: Arthropoda
- Clade: Pancrustacea
- Class: Insecta
- Order: Lepidoptera
- Family: Papilionidae
- Genus: Iphiclides
- Species: I. podalirinus

Binomial name
- Iphiclides podalirinus (Oberthür, 1890)

Synonyms
- Papilio podalirinus Oberthür, 1890; Papilio podalirius podalirinus Rothschild, 1895; Iphiclides podalirius podalirinus

= Iphiclides podalirinus =

Species of butterfly

Iphiclides podalirinus, the Chinese scarce swallowtail, is a species of butterfly from the family Papilionidae that is found in China and Tibet.

This species was formerly considered a subspecies of Iphiclides podalirius.
