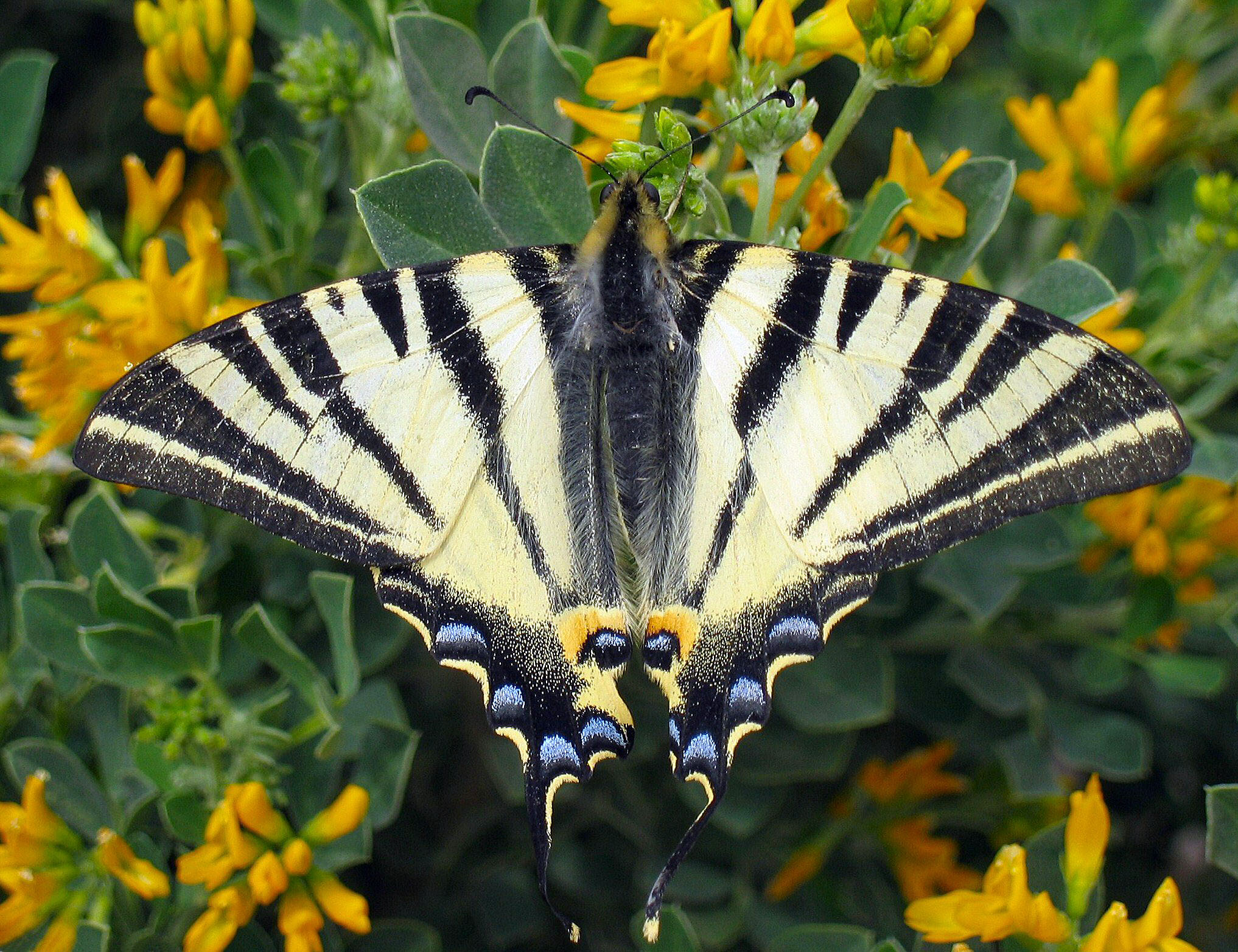
- Upperside
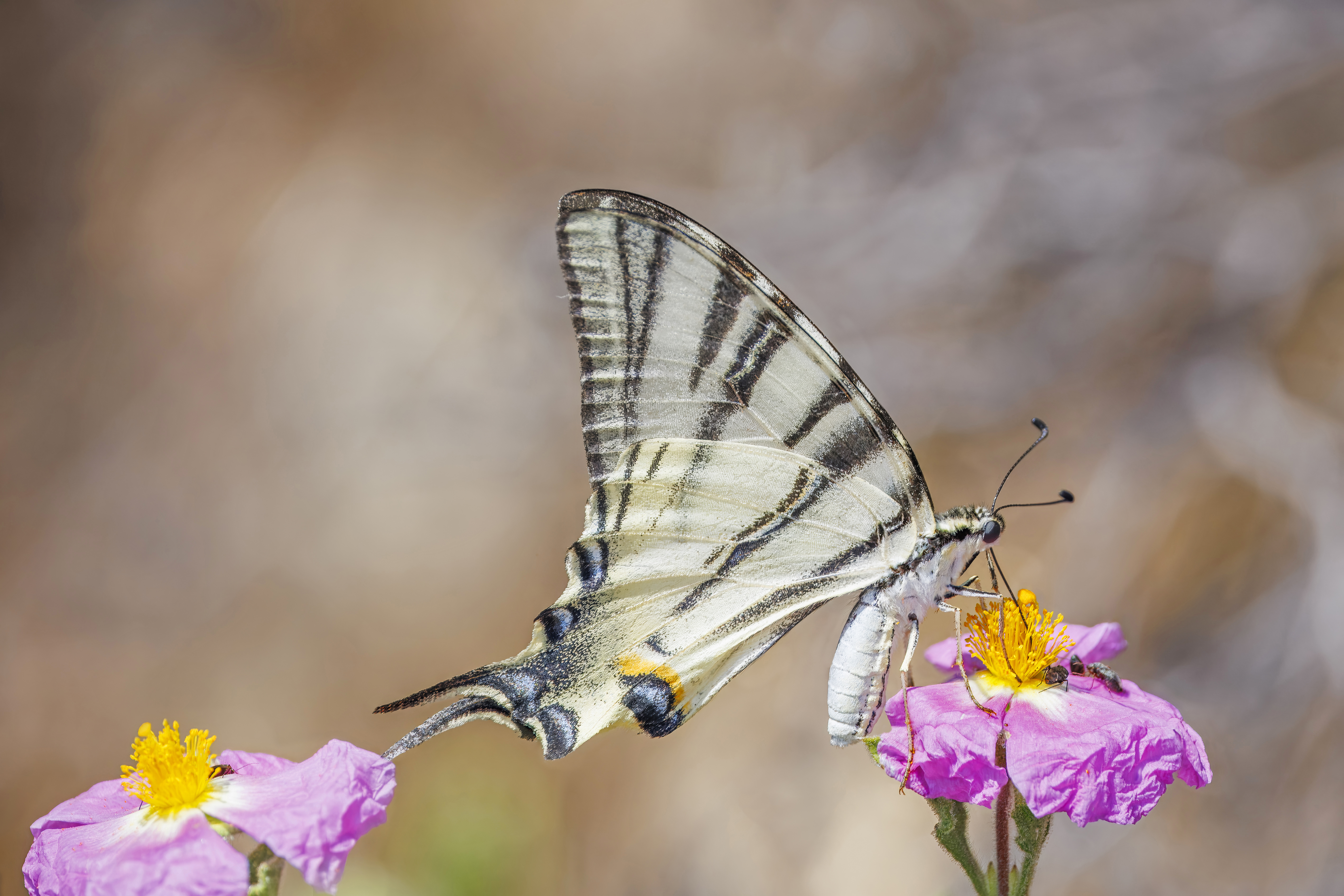
- Underside

Scientific classification
- Kingdom: Animalia
- Phylum: Arthropoda
- Class: Insecta
- Order: Lepidoptera
- Family: Papilionidae
- Genus: Iphiclides
- Species: I. podalirius

Binomial name
- Iphiclides podalirius (Linnaeus, 1758)

= Scarce swallowtail =

Species of butterfly

The scarce swallowtail (Iphiclides podalirius) is a species of butterfly belonging to the family Papilionidae. It is also called the sail swallowtail or pear-tree swallowtail.

== Subspecies ==
Subspecies include:

- Iphiclides podalirius centralasiae (Rosen, 1929)
- Iphiclides podalirius persica Verity, 1911
- Iphiclides podalirius podalirius (Central and Southern Europe)
- Iphiclides podalirius virgatus (Butler, 1865)
- Iphiclides podalirius xinyuanensis Huang & Murayama, 1992 China (Xinyuan)

Else see:

- Iphiclides podalirius feisthamelii (North Africa, Spain and southwest France), often treated as a valid species, Iphiclides feisthamelii.

== Distribution ==
Despite the name "scarce swallowtail", this species is quite common. The scarcity of United Kingdom migrants is responsible for the English vernacular name. This species is widespread in the East Palearctic realm and in most of Europe with the exception of the northern parts. Its range extends northwards to Lower Lusatia and central Poland and eastwards across Asia Minor and Transcaucasia as far as the Arabian Peninsula, Pakistan, India and western China. A few specimens of the scarce swallowtail have been reported from central Sweden and the United Kingdom but they were probably only strays and not migrants.

== Habitat ==
These swallowtail butterflies inhabit gardens, towns as well as the countryside, in fields and open woodlands. They are found in places with sloe thickets and particularly orchards. In the Alps they can be found up to altitudes of 2000 m, but usually they prefer foothills and lower levels.

The presence of Iphiclides podalirius in the floodplain of the Morava River in the Slovak Republic have been found to be a good indicator of relatively well preserved xerothermic grassland habitats with forest-steppe vegetation, which have no cutting history.

== Status ==
In some years the scarce swallowtail is quite abundant. The scarce swallowtail is getting rarer as blackthorn bushes are being cleared. The butterfly is now protected by law in the Czech Republic, Slovakia, Germany, Hungary, Luxembourg, Russia, Ukraine, Poland and Macedonia . It is considered rare and endangered and protected in some provinces of Austria and of indeterminate status throughout Europe. In Armenia the species demonstrates stable population trend and is evaluated as Least Concern. Though referred by some authorities to be of status "vulnerable", it is however unlisted in the IUCN Red List.

== Description ==
Iphiclides podalirius has a wingspan of 60–80 millimetres (2.4–3.1 in) in males, of 62–90 millimetres (2.4–3.5 in) in females. It is a very large distinctive butterfly. The background color of the wings is creamy white or pale yellow. On the front wings there are six tiger stripes and wedge-shaped markings. At the outer edge of the hind wings there are blue crescent markings, with an oblong, orange spot at the back corner and a relatively long tail.

This species is rather similar to Papilio machaon, Papilio hospiton, Papilio alexanor and Protographium marcellus.

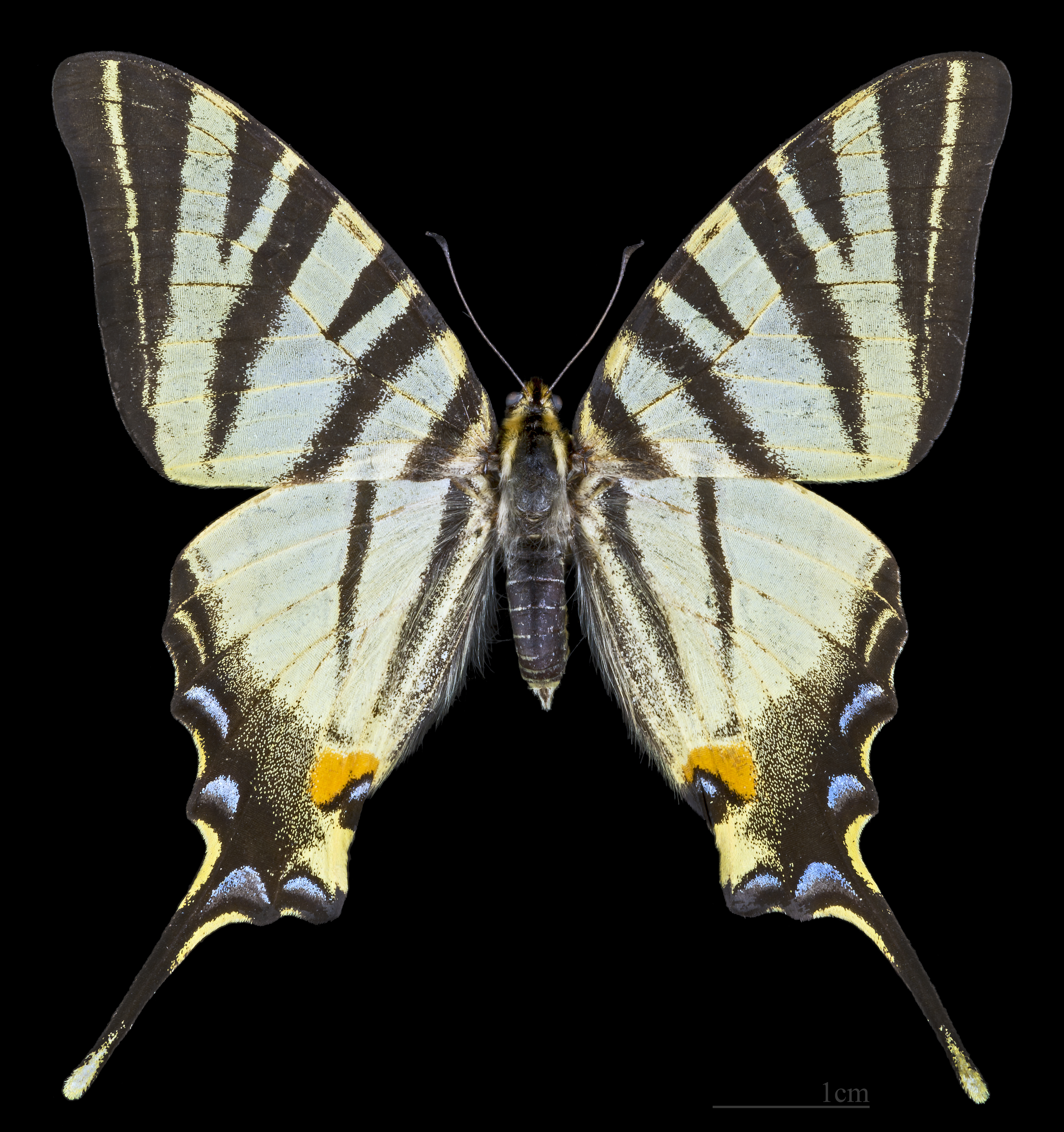
Male

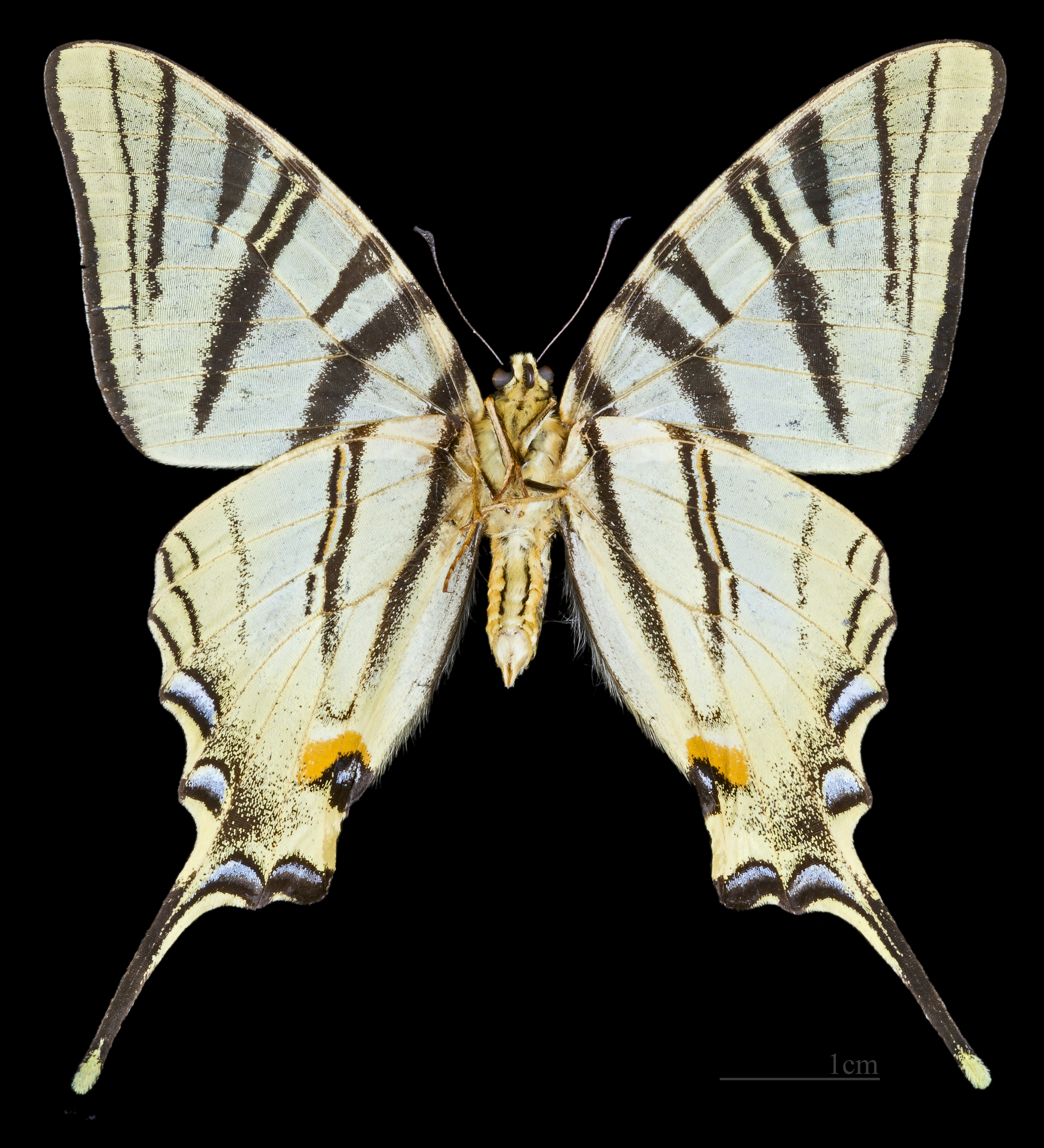
Male underside

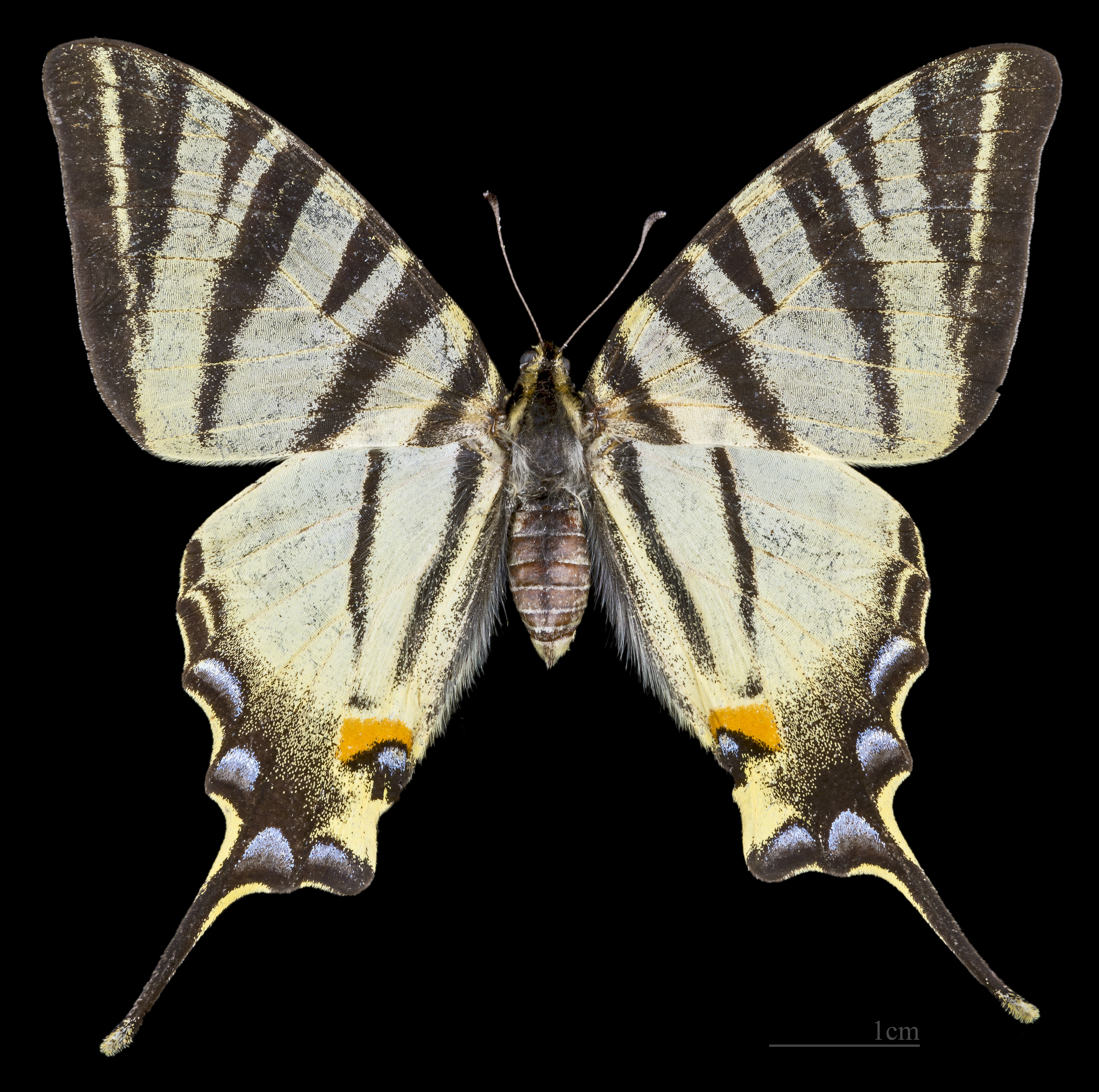
Female

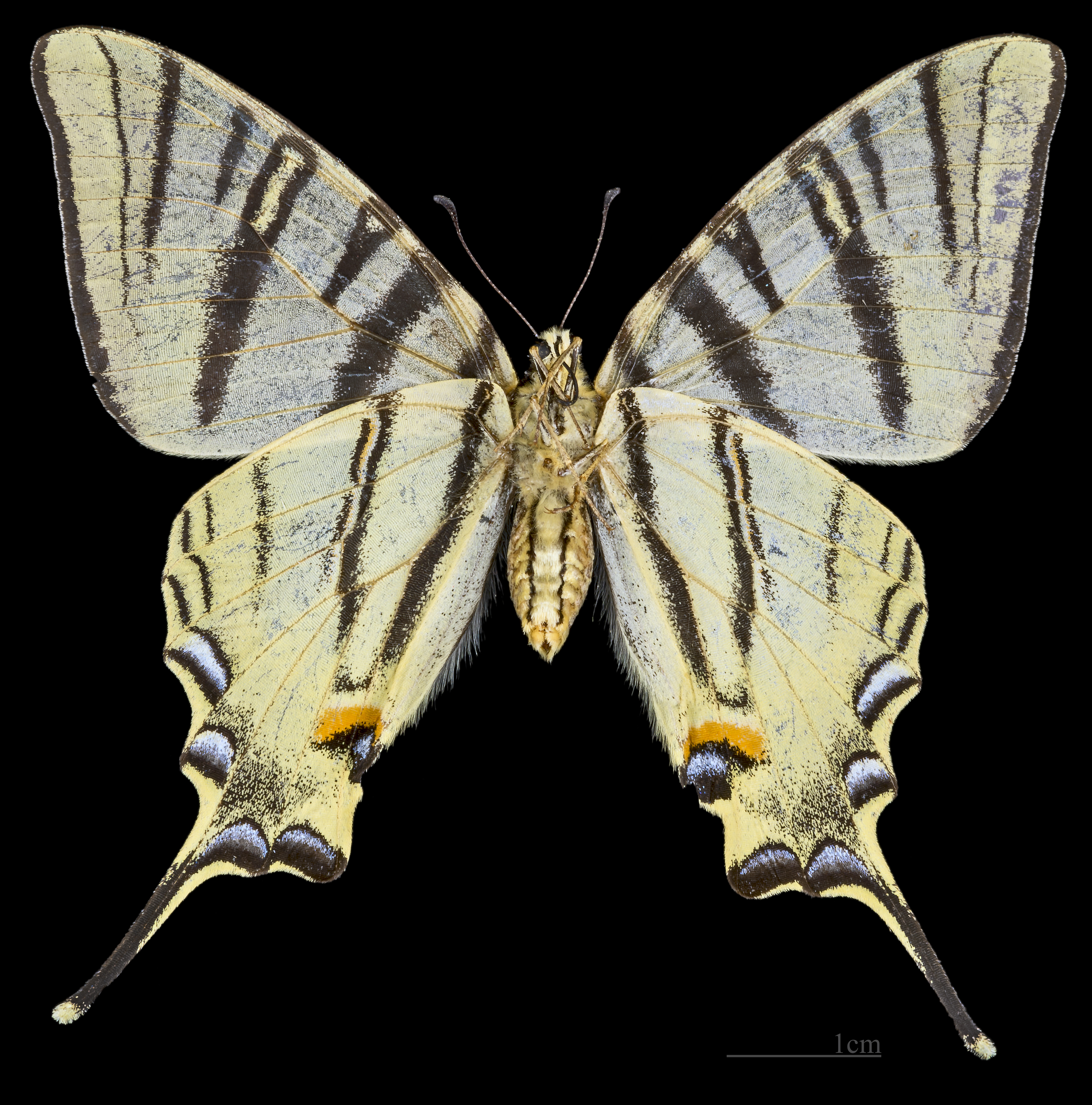
Female underside

== Biology ==
Adults of Iphiclides podalirius fly from March to October. There are one, two, or three generations a year. Caterpillars are polyphagous feeding on Crataegus (Finland), Crataegus monogyna (Palaearctic), Malus pumila and Malus domestica (Palaearctic), Prunus (Finland, Palaearctic), Prunus armeniaca (Palaearctic, Spain), Prunus avium (Palaearctic, Spain) Prunus cerasus (Palaearctic, Russia), Prunus domestica (Palaearctic), Prunus dulcis (Palaearctic, Spain), Prunus padus (Palaearctic), Prunus persica (Palaearctic), Prunus spinosa (Palaearctic), Pyrus (Palaearctic) and Sorbus aucuparia (Palaearctic).

The caterpillars spin little pads on leaves and grip them firmly. The newly hatched caterpillar is dark in colour with two smaller and two bigger greenish patches on the dorsal side; later they are greenish with yellowish dorsal and side stripes. The summer chrysalids are green as a rule, the hibernating ones are brown. A number of hibernating chrysalids fall prey to various enemies. The caterpillars of the scarce swallowtail have been noted to leave silk trails from the permanent resting sites to feeding sites. This has been seen in both solitary and territorial larvae with larvae having the ability to discern their trails from those of others.

Research on pupae of Iphiclides podalirius in Spain indicates that the pupae manifest in two colours, green and brown, for the purpose of camouflage. The green pupae develop on host plants and develop directly while brown pupae enter into diapause in the leaf litter. Pupating larvae tend to form green pupae before August while after August they tend to form brown pupae. Duration of the photophase or light period appears to be the mechanism which dictates the path of development of the pupa. The results suggest that the green pupa develop on food plants to avoid predation by small mammals and visual avian predators while the brown pupa develop on leaf litter to avoid avian predators.

== Life cycle ==
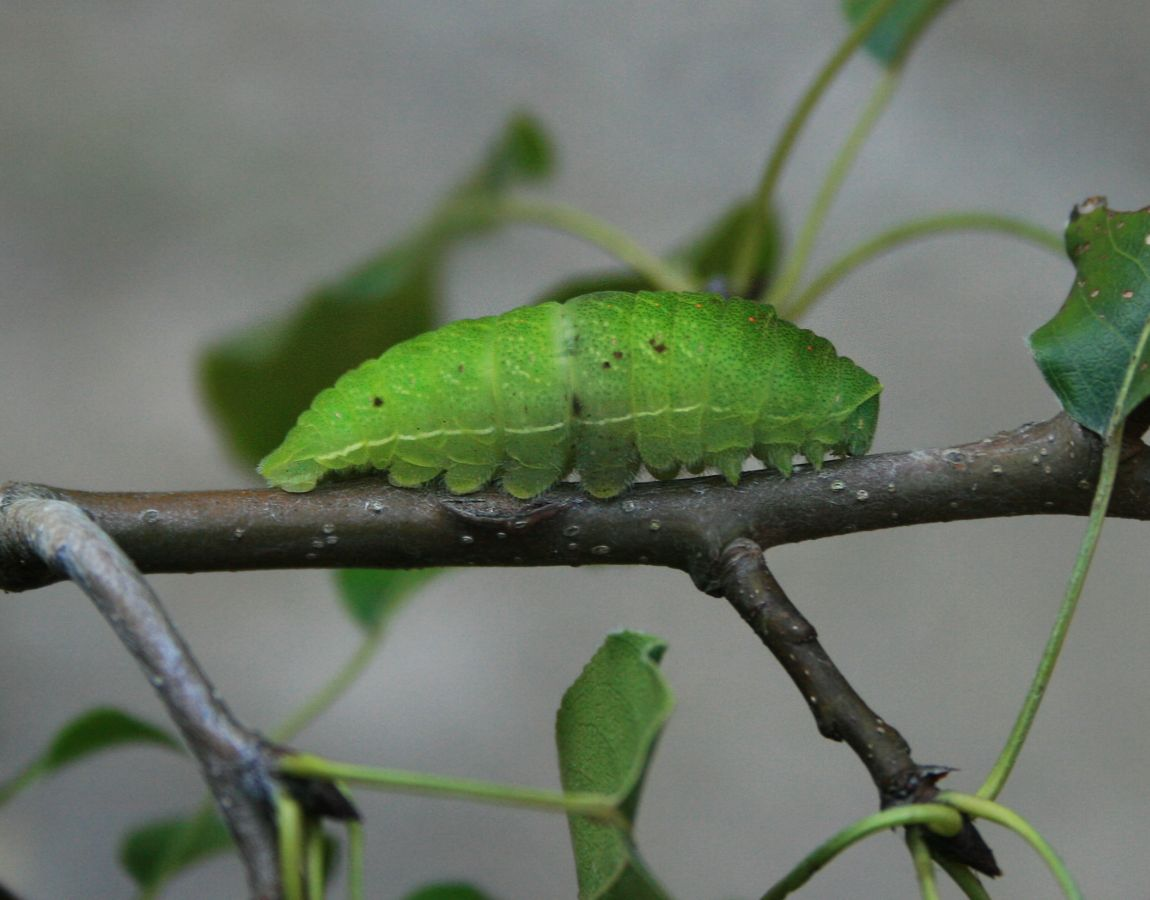
Caterpillar

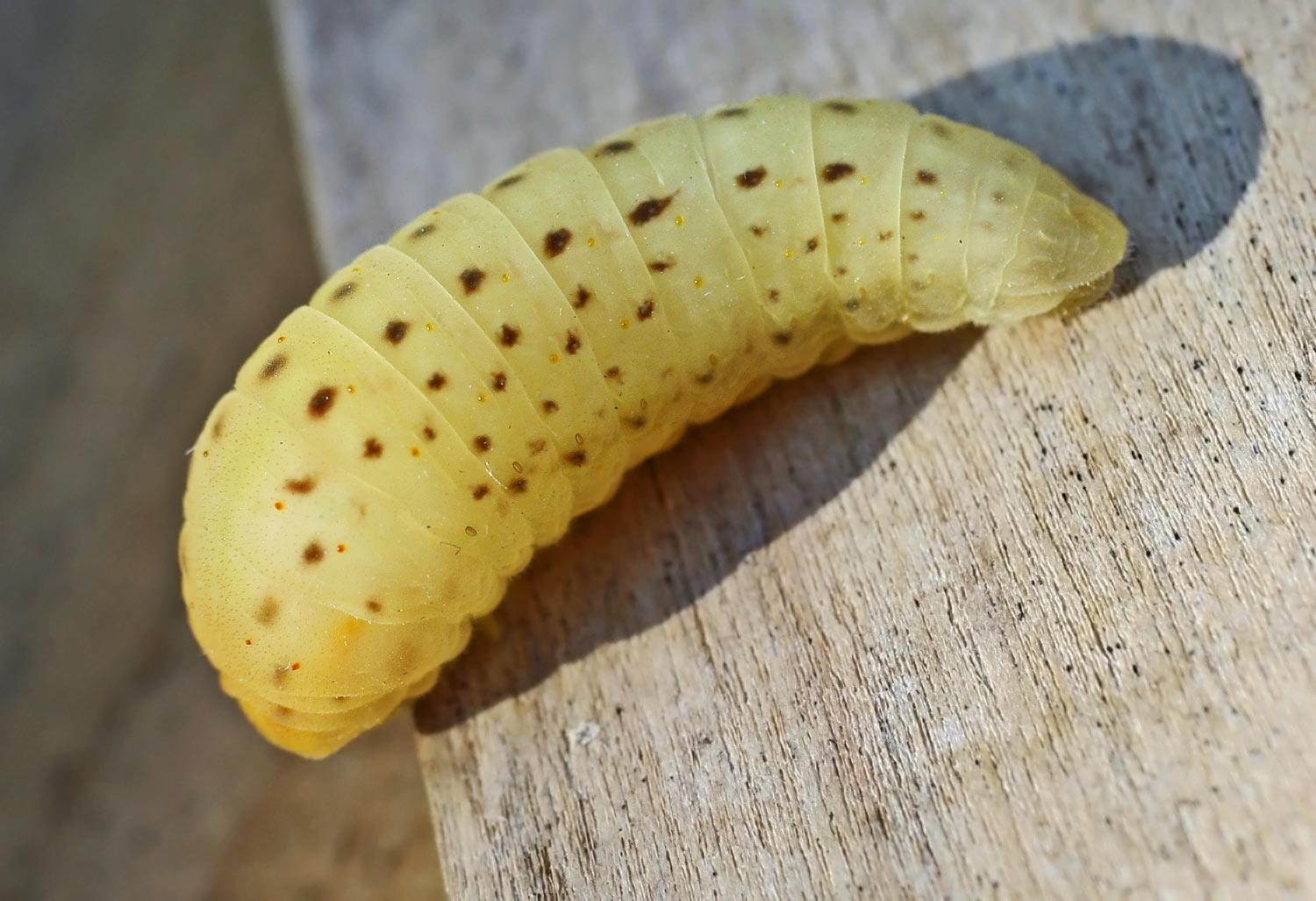
Pupating caterpillar

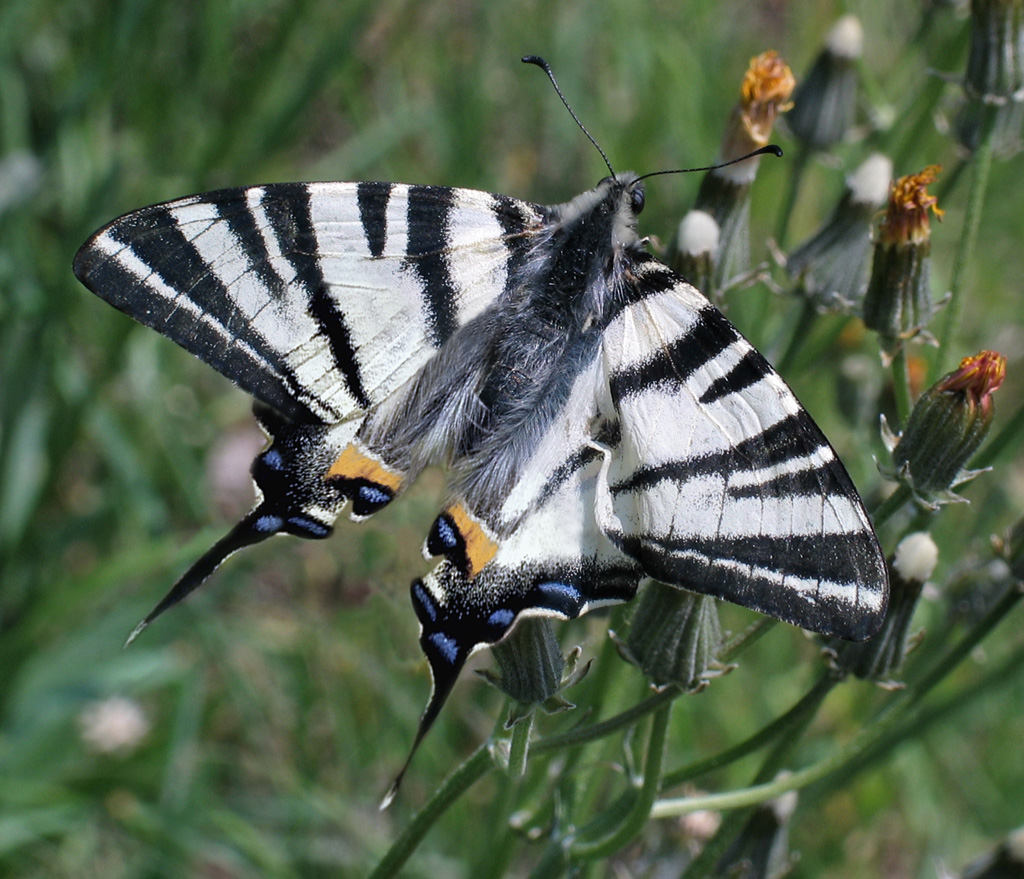
Imago
