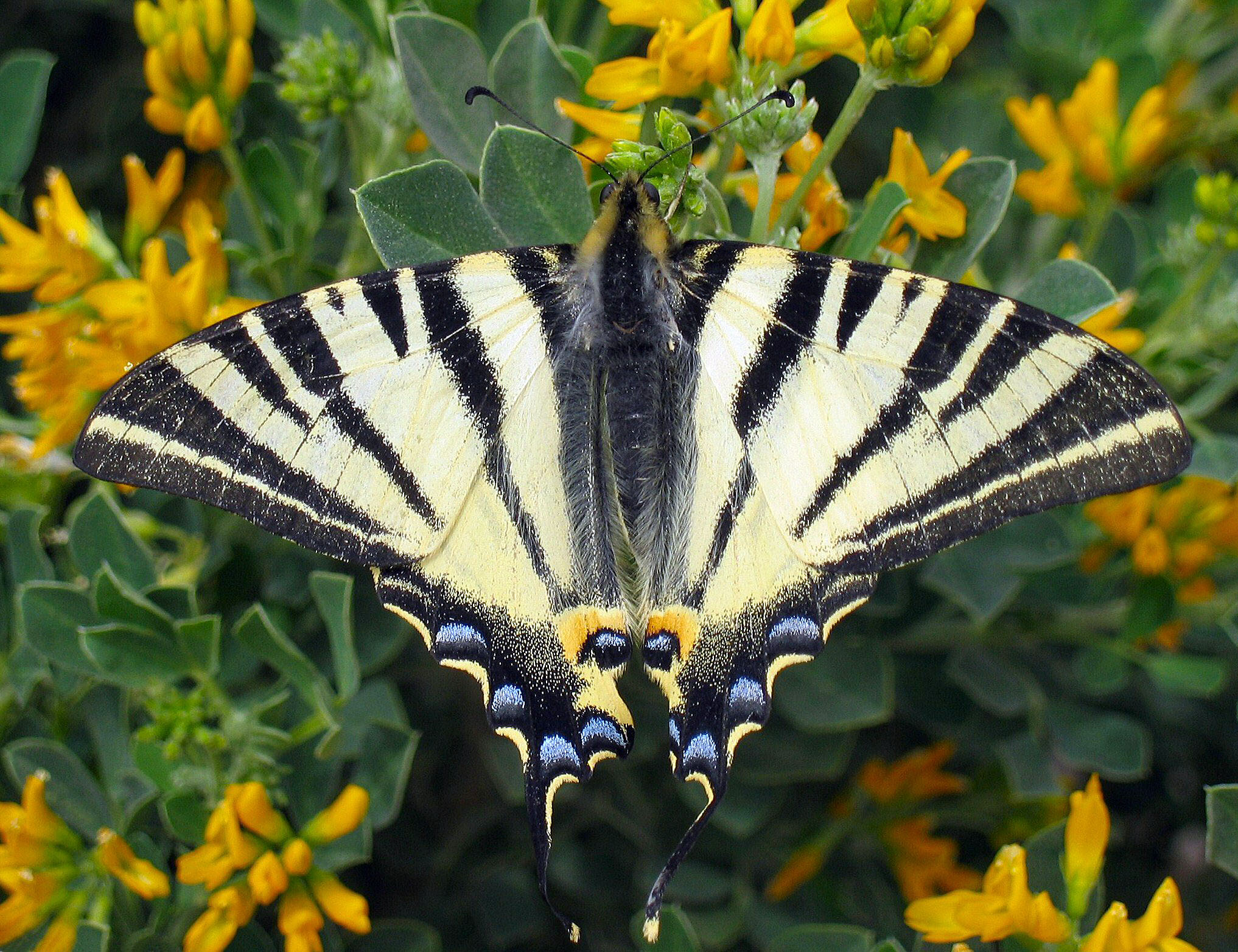
- Iphiclides podalirius, the scarce swallowtail

Scientific classification
- Kingdom: Animalia
- Phylum: Arthropoda
- Clade: Pancrustacea
- Class: Insecta
- Order: Lepidoptera
- Family: Papilionidae
- Tribe: Leptocircini
- Genus: Iphiclides; Hübner, [1819]

Species
- See text.

= Iphiclides =

Genus of insects

Iphiclides is a genus of butterflies of the family Papilionidae (swallowtails).

== Taxonomy ==
The genus was described by Jacob Hübner in 1819. It contains three species: I. feisthamelii (Duponchel, 1832) (in some schemes as a subspecies instead), the poorly known I. podalirinus (Oberthür, 1890), and the type species I. podalirius (Linnaeus, 1758).

Iphiclides feisthamelii (Duponchel, 1832), the southern swallowtail, is found on the Iberian Peninsula and in Northwest Africa. These are often considered as subspecies of I. podalirius, although some specimens from Northwest Africa can have notable genetic differences.

Iphiclides podalirinus (Oberthür, 1890), the Chinese scarce swallowtail, is a little-known species occurring in China, that was also previously considered a subspecies of I. podalirius. It is not known to be threatened but more data is required on this butterfly.

Iphiclides podalirius (Linnaeus, 1758), the scarce swallowtail, is found in gardens, fields and open woodlands. It is found in places with sloe thickets and particularly orchards. It is widespread throughout Europe with the exception of the northern parts. Its range extends northwards to Germany (Brandenburg) and central Poland and eastwards across Asia Minor and Transcaucasia as far as Kazakhstan, and western-most China. The species is getting rarer in parts of range due to loss of habitat and removal of food plants. It is protected by law in some European countries. It is considered rare or endangered in some provinces of Austria and of indeterminate status throughout Europe.
