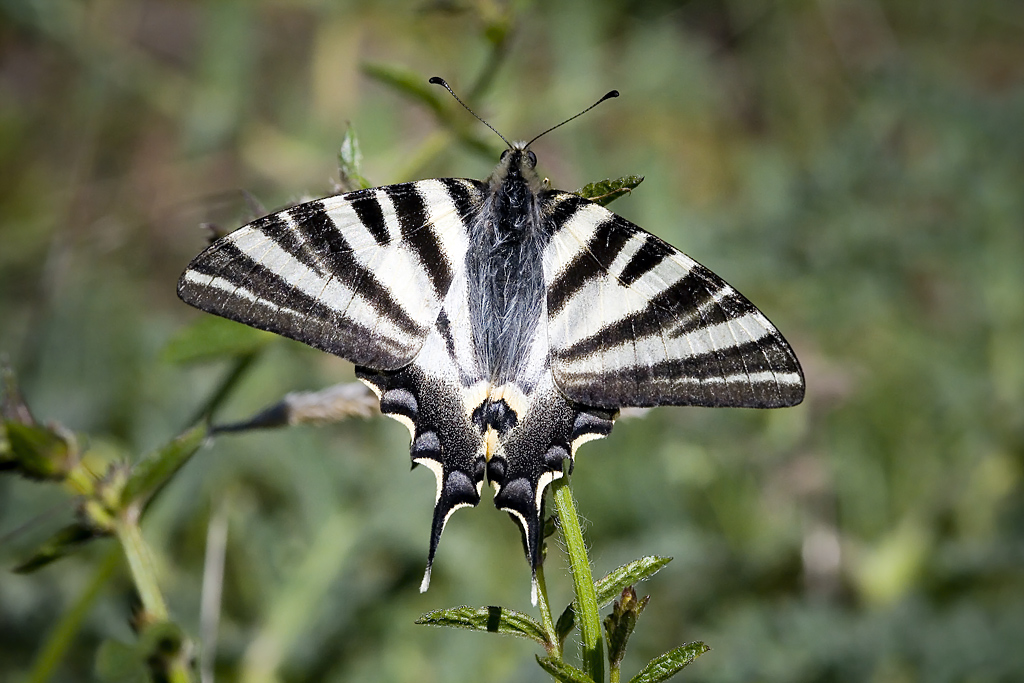
- Female
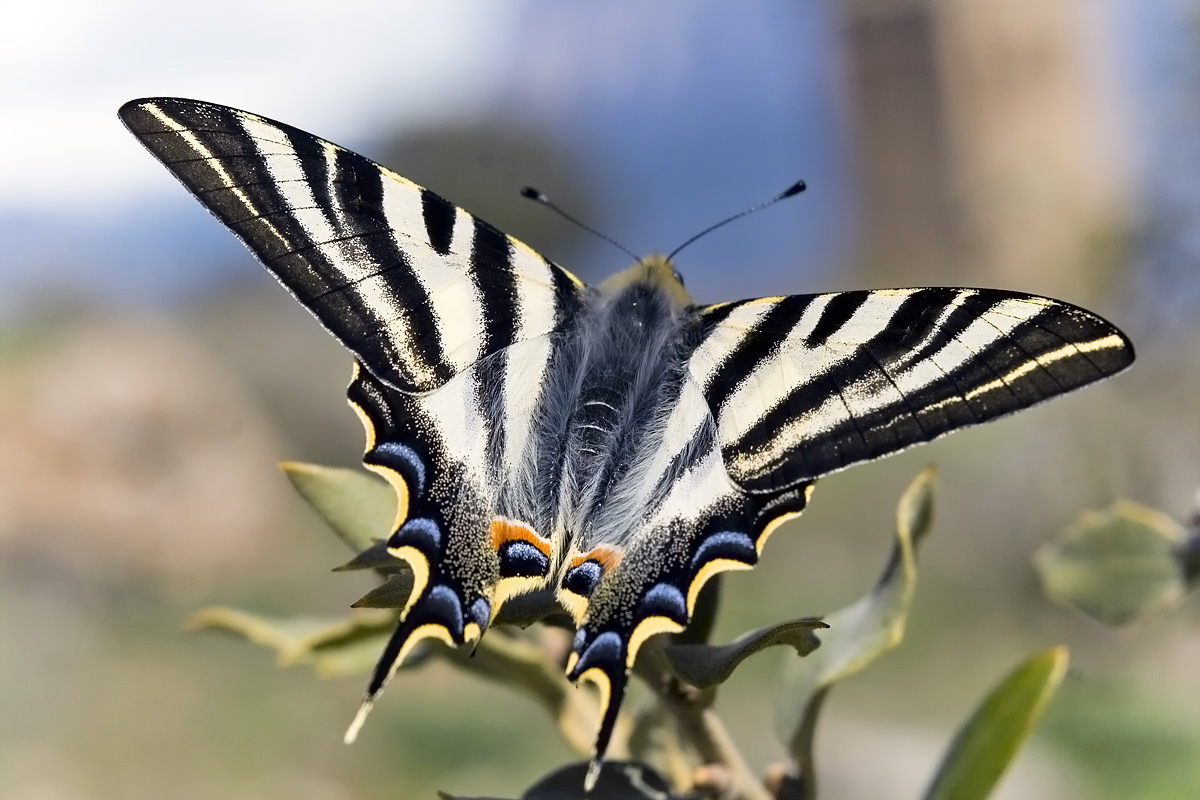
- Male

Scientific classification
- Domain: Eukaryota
- Kingdom: Animalia
- Phylum: Arthropoda
- Class: Insecta
- Order: Lepidoptera
- Family: Papilionidae
- Genus: Iphiclides
- Species: I. feisthamelii

Binomial name
- Iphiclides feisthamelii (Duponchel, 1832)

= Iphiclides feisthamelii =

Species of butterfly

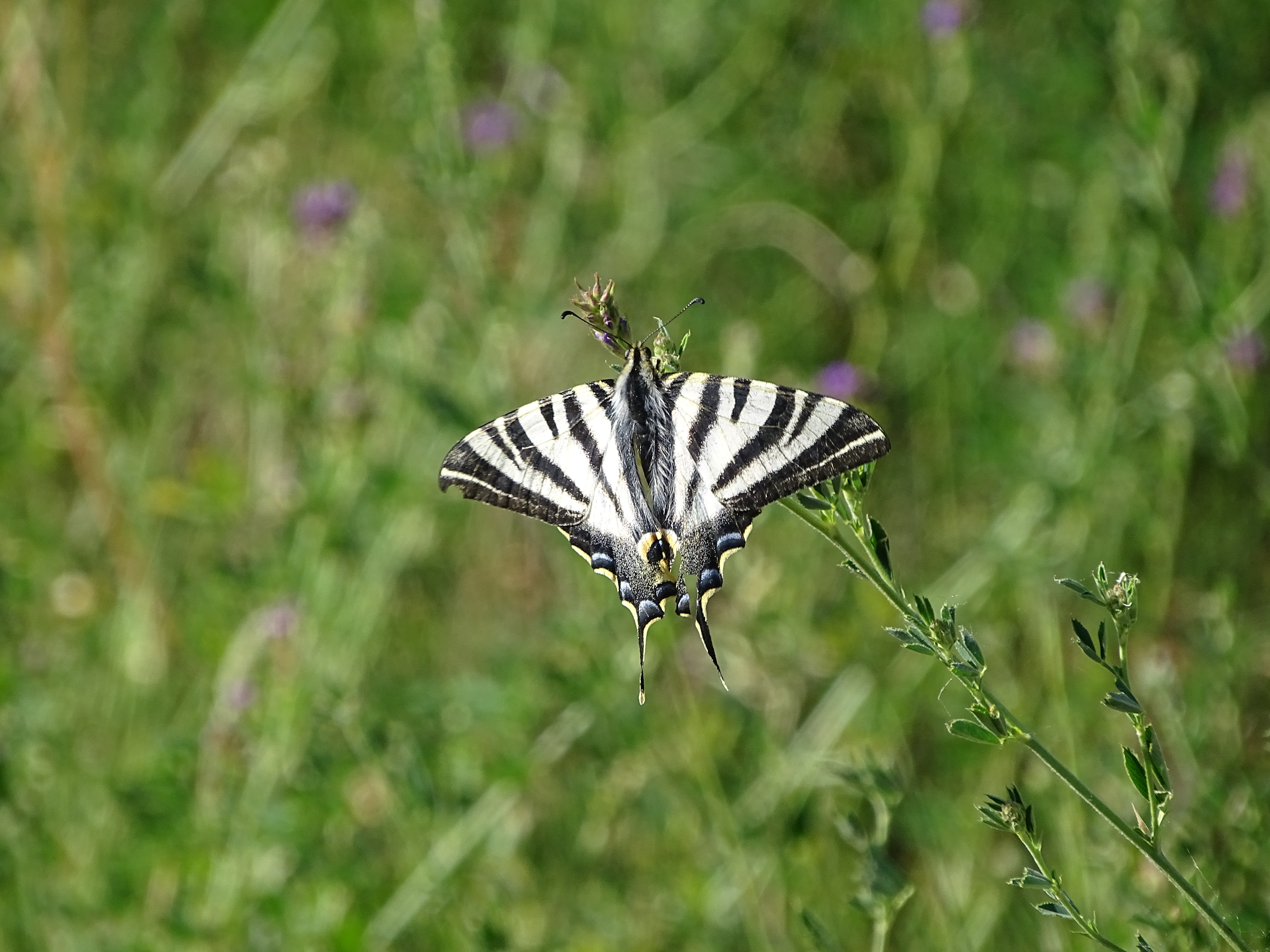
Iphiclides feisthamelii en Aragon

Iphiclides feisthamelii, the southern scarce swallowtail, southern swallowtail or Iberian scarce swallowtail, is a butterfly found in Italy, Slovenia, southern France, Spain, Portugal, Morocco, Algeria Tunisia and Serbia. It is sometimes considered a subspecies of I. podalirius.

== Description ==
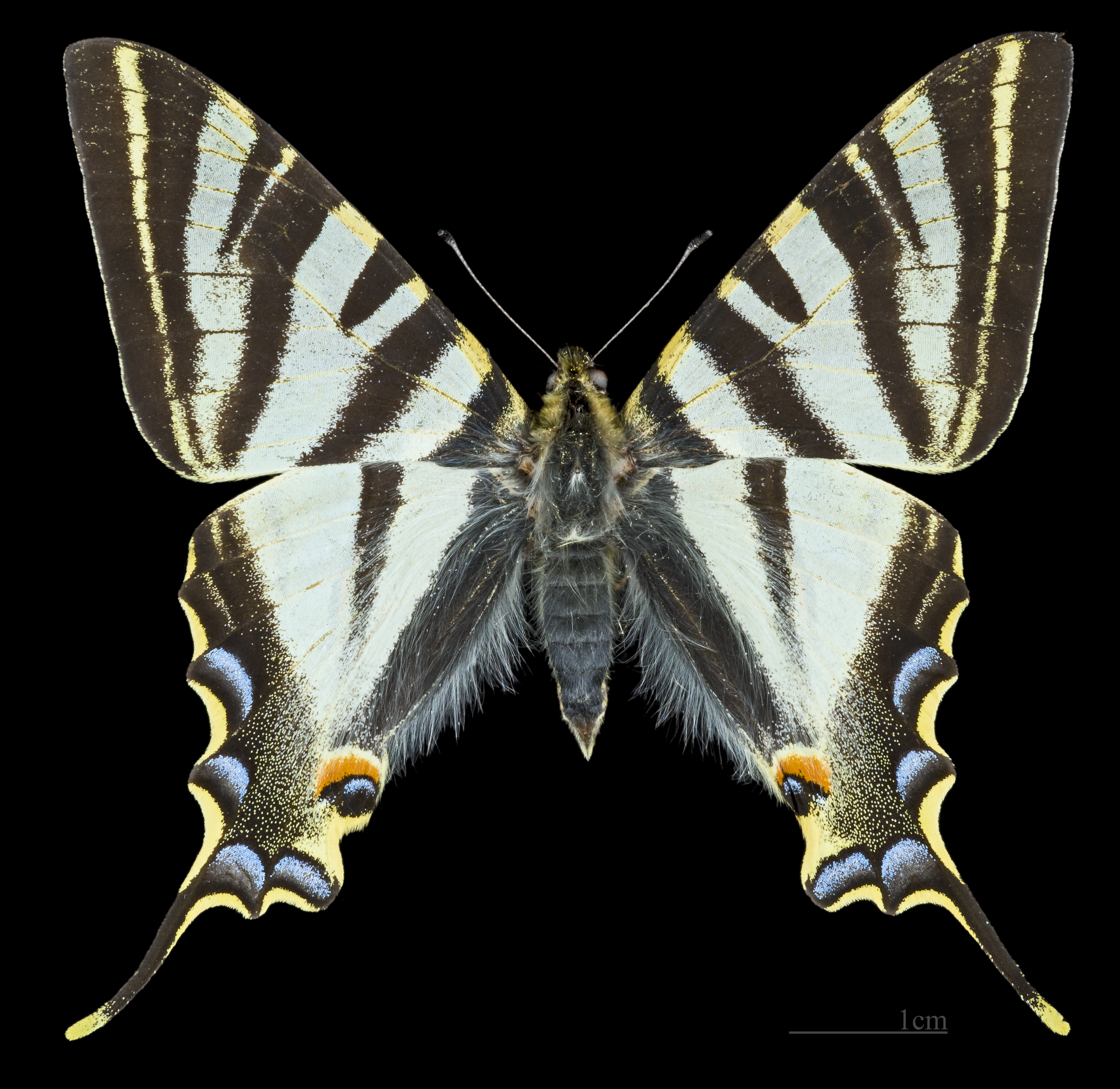
Male

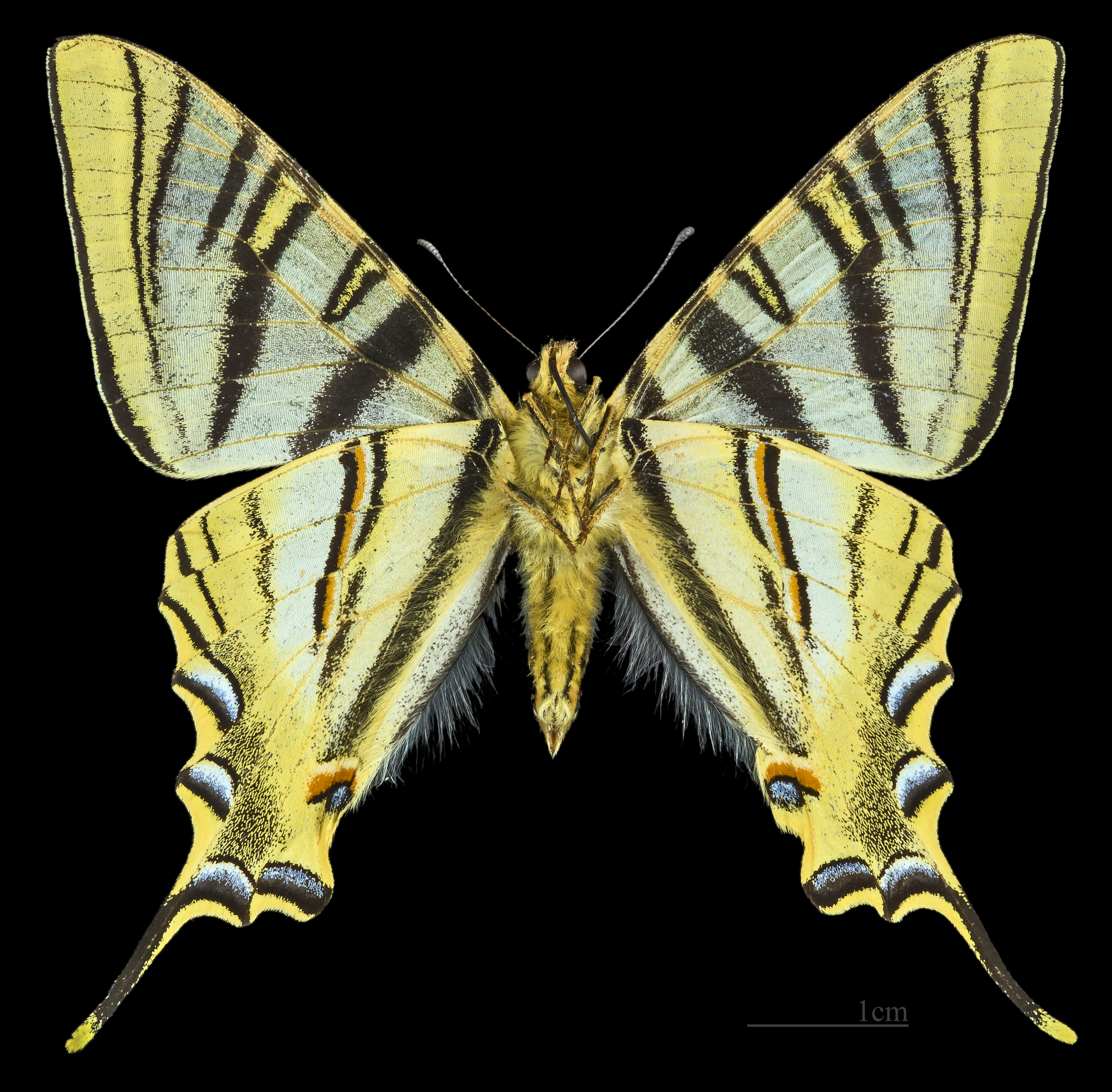
Male underside

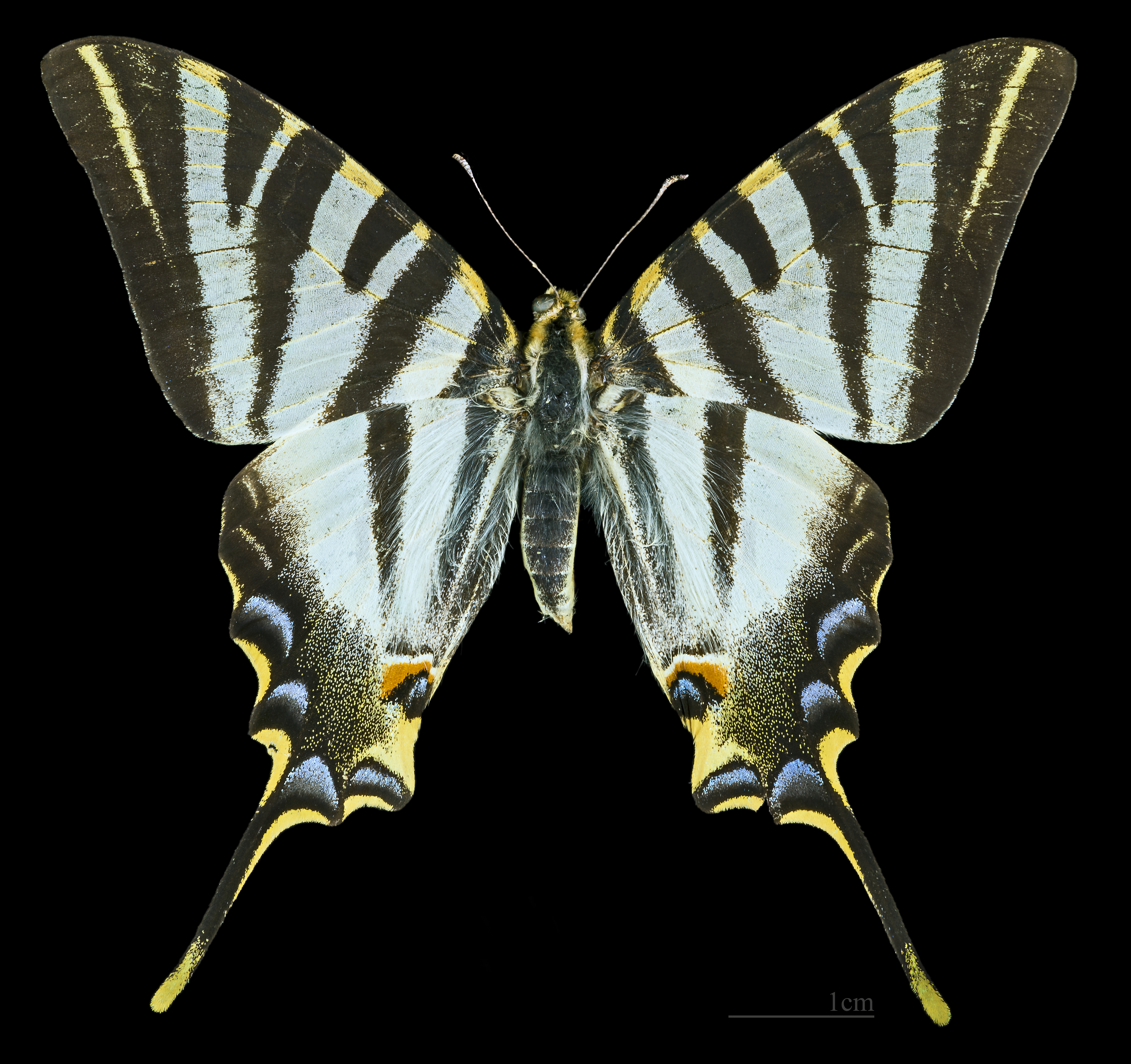
Female

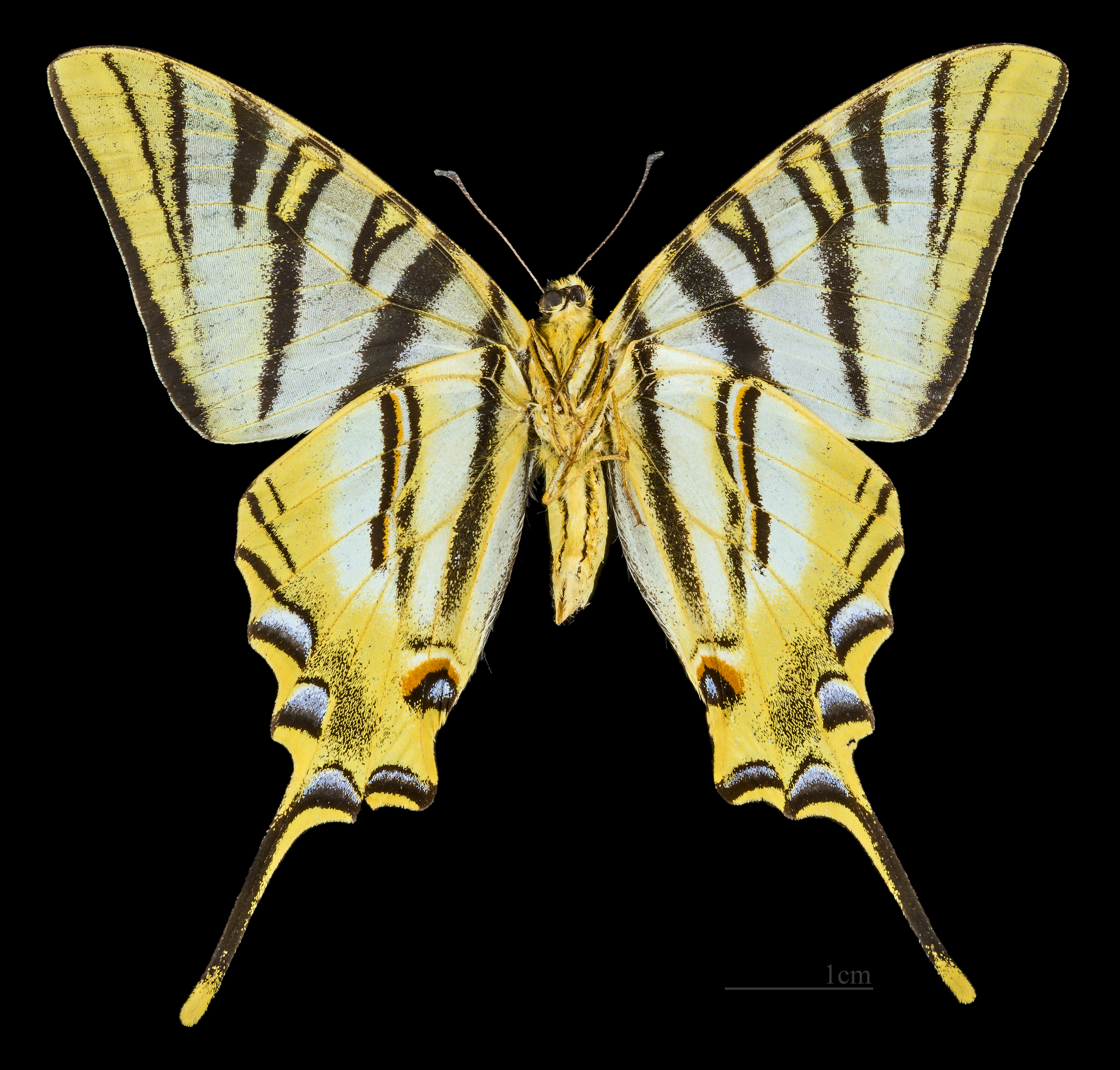
Female underside

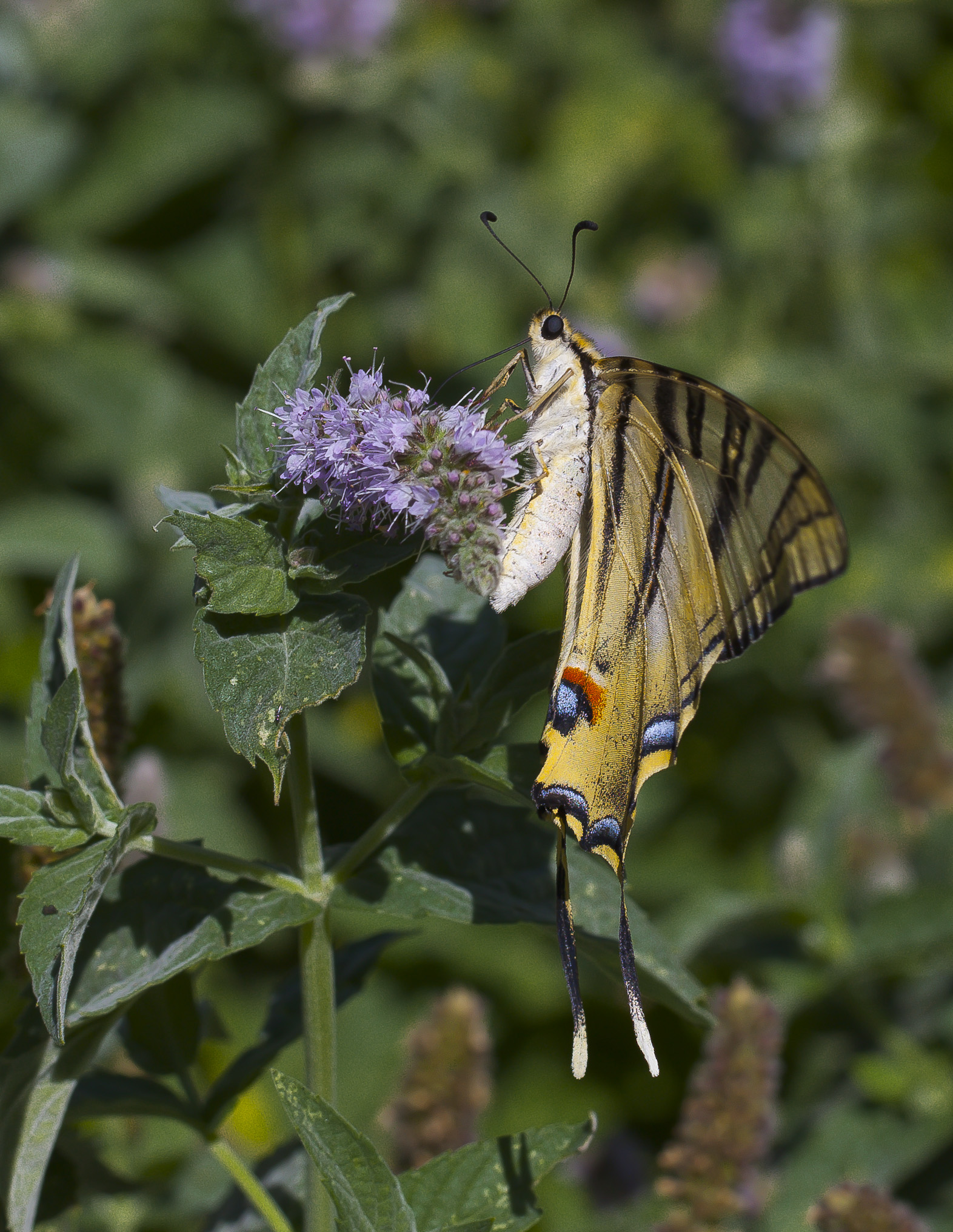
Male side

The larva feeds on Prunus amygdalus (almond), P. persica (peach), P. insititia (a kind of plum), P. longipes, Pyrus communis (common pear), Malus domesticus (apple) and Crataegus oxyacantha.
