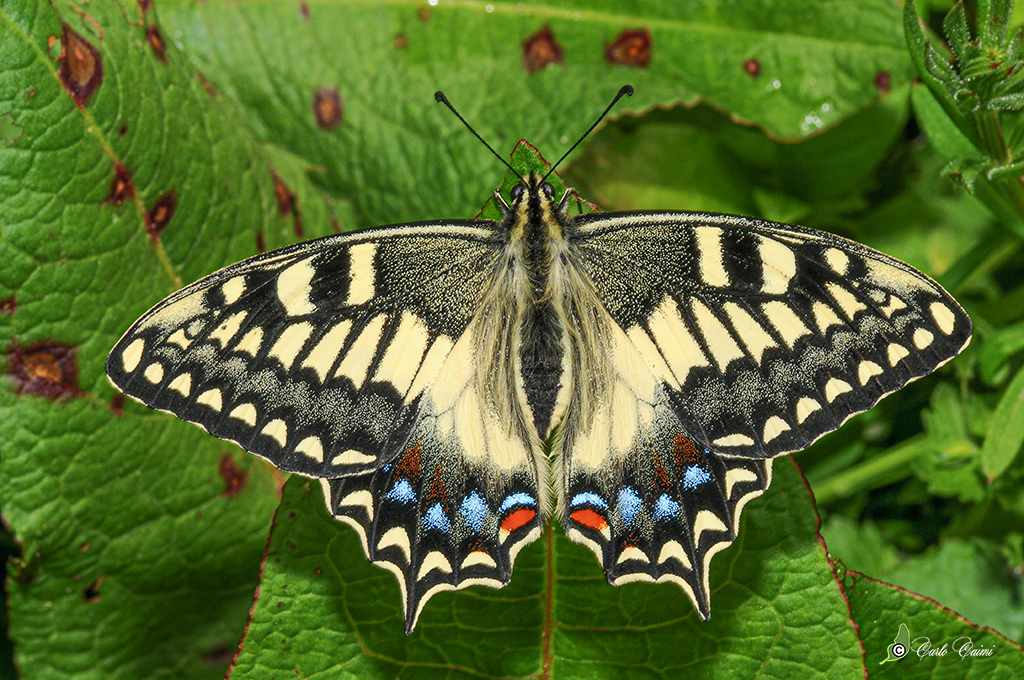
- Upperside
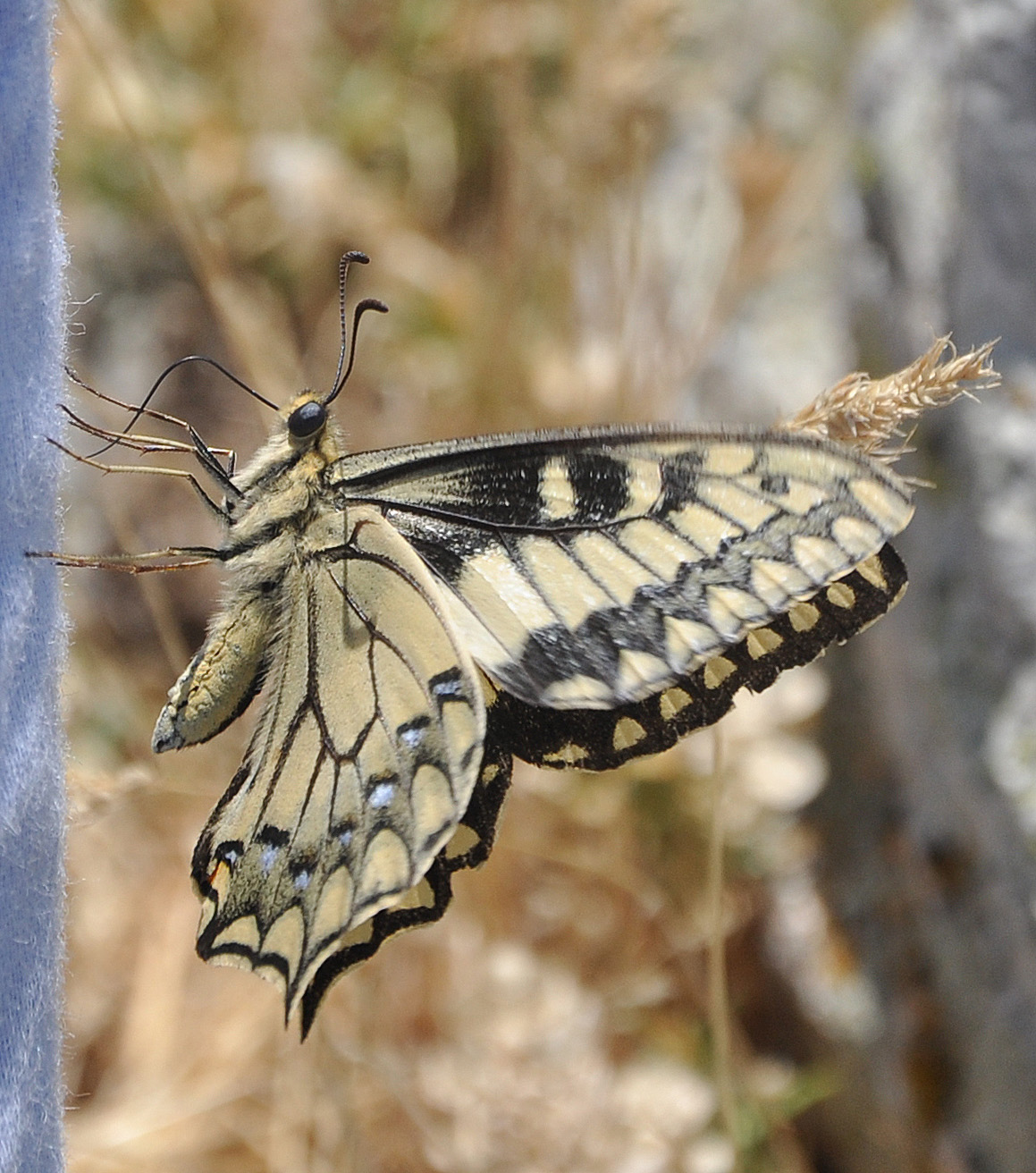
- Underside

Conservation status
- Least Concern (IUCN 3.1)
- CITES Appendix II

Scientific classification
- Kingdom: Animalia
- Phylum: Arthropoda
- Clade: Pancrustacea
- Class: Insecta
- Order: Lepidoptera
- Family: Papilionidae
- Genus: Papilio
- Species: P. hospiton

Binomial name
- Papilio hospiton Gené, 1839

= Papilio hospiton =

Species of butterfly

Papilio hospiton, the Corsican swallowtail, is a species of butterfly in the family Papilionidae. It is found only in Corsica and Sardinia in the Mediterranean Sea.

A medium-sized butterfly with a wingspan of 72–76 millimetres (2.8–3.0 in), Papilio hospiton is a short black-and-yellow swallowtail with short tails. The butterfly has blue and red markings. Sexes are alike.

Papilio hospiton is similar to Papilio machaon, but the wings are more rounded, and the hindwing is provided with a short tooth instead of a tail. The black colour is more extended and more densely powdered with yellow than in P. machaon.

The caterpillar is green, striped with black and dotted with small yellowish-red punctures, the black colour being more extended than in the larva of P. machaon. Chrysalis green, the abdominal tubercles more prominent than in P. machaon.

The Corsican swallowtail inhabits mountainous regions at 400–1,500 metres (1,300–4,900 ft) above sea level on the islands of Corsica and Sardinia. The food plants are from the family Umbelliferae, and include fennel, giant fennel (Ferula communis), Corsican rue (Ruta corsica) and Peucedanum paniculatum though some of these records are disputed. Papilio hospiton is bivoltine with broods in May and August. Habitat destruction and disappearance of food plants as well as excessive collecting are the principal threats to the Corsican swallowtail.
