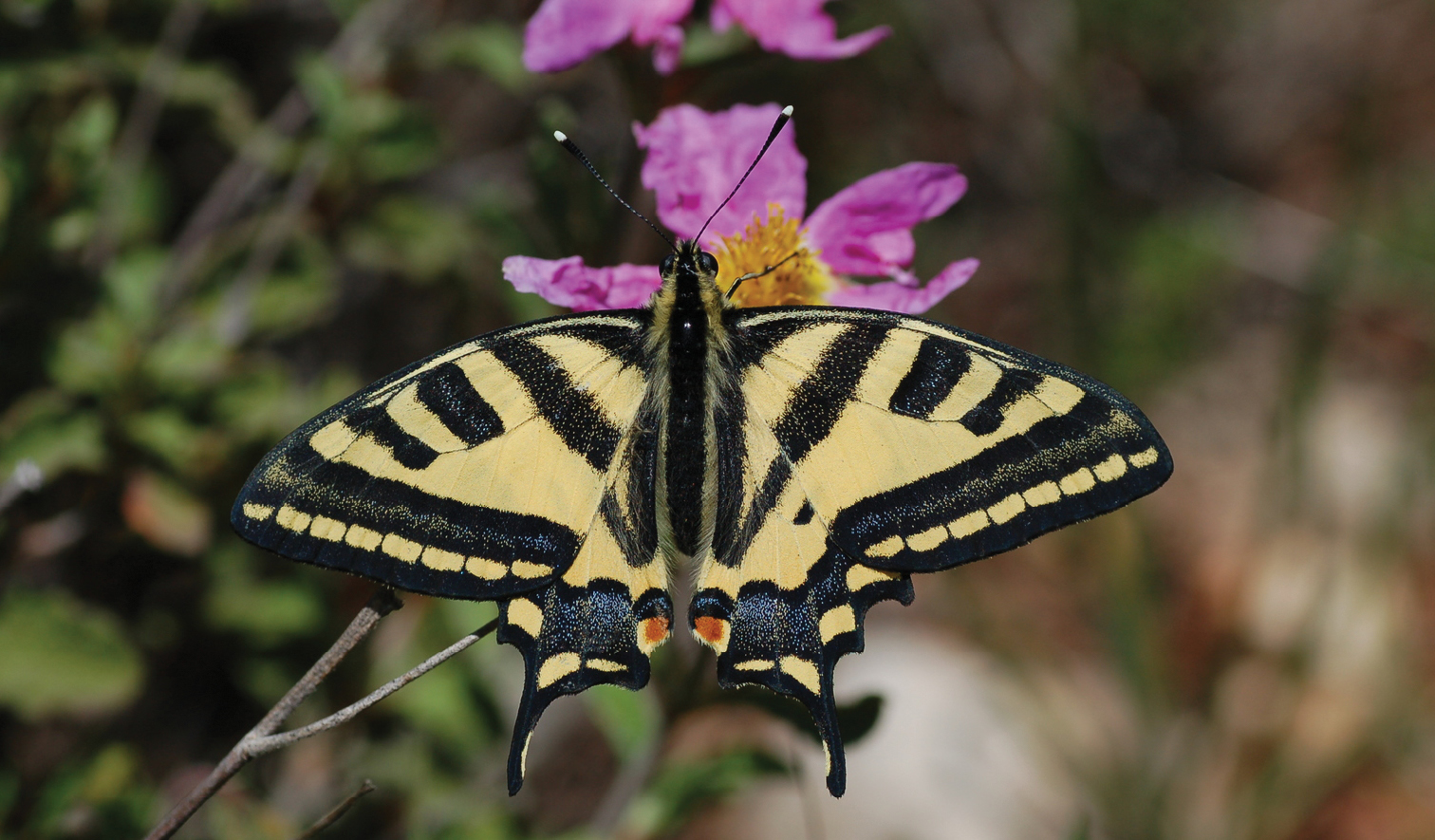

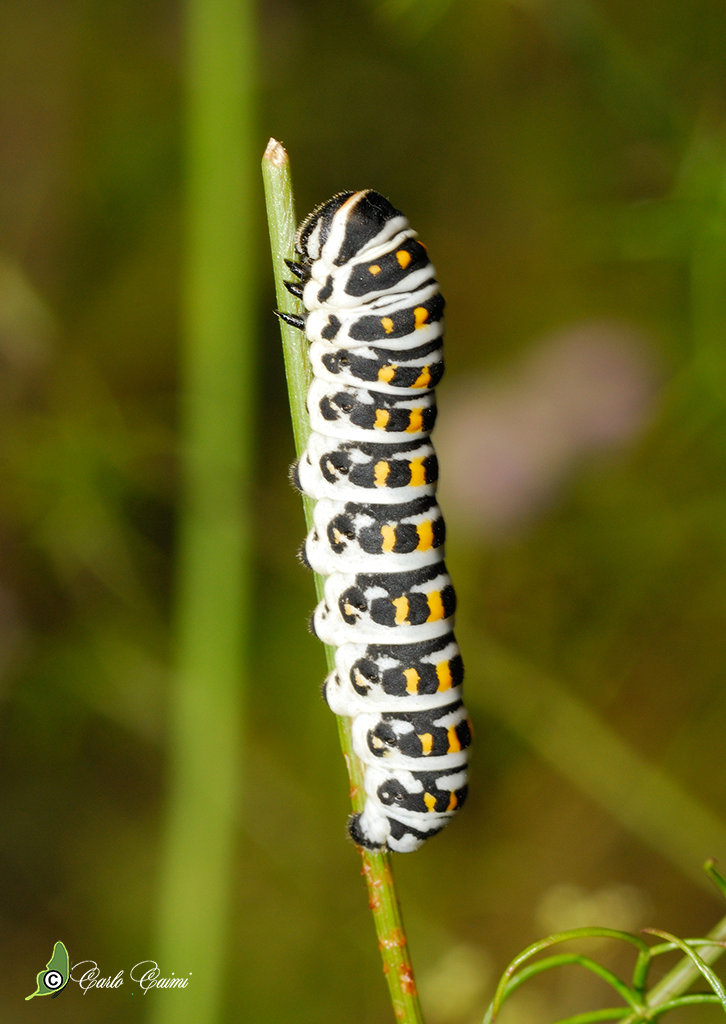

Scientific classification
- Kingdom: Animalia
- Phylum: Arthropoda
- Clade: Pancrustacea
- Class: Insecta
- Order: Lepidoptera
- Family: Papilionidae
- Genus: Papilio
- Species: P. alexanor

Binomial name
- Papilio alexanor Esper, 1799

= Papilio alexanor =

Species of butterfly

Papilio alexanor, the Alexanor or southern swallowtail, is a butterfly species in the Papilionidae or swallowtails.

The insect has a wingspan of 62–70 mm. It flies from April to July in a single generation, in mountainous regions (1700 m) of Europe, Asia Minor, the Balkans, and Asia (Anatolia, Iran, Afghanistan, Pakistan to west Tian-Shan).

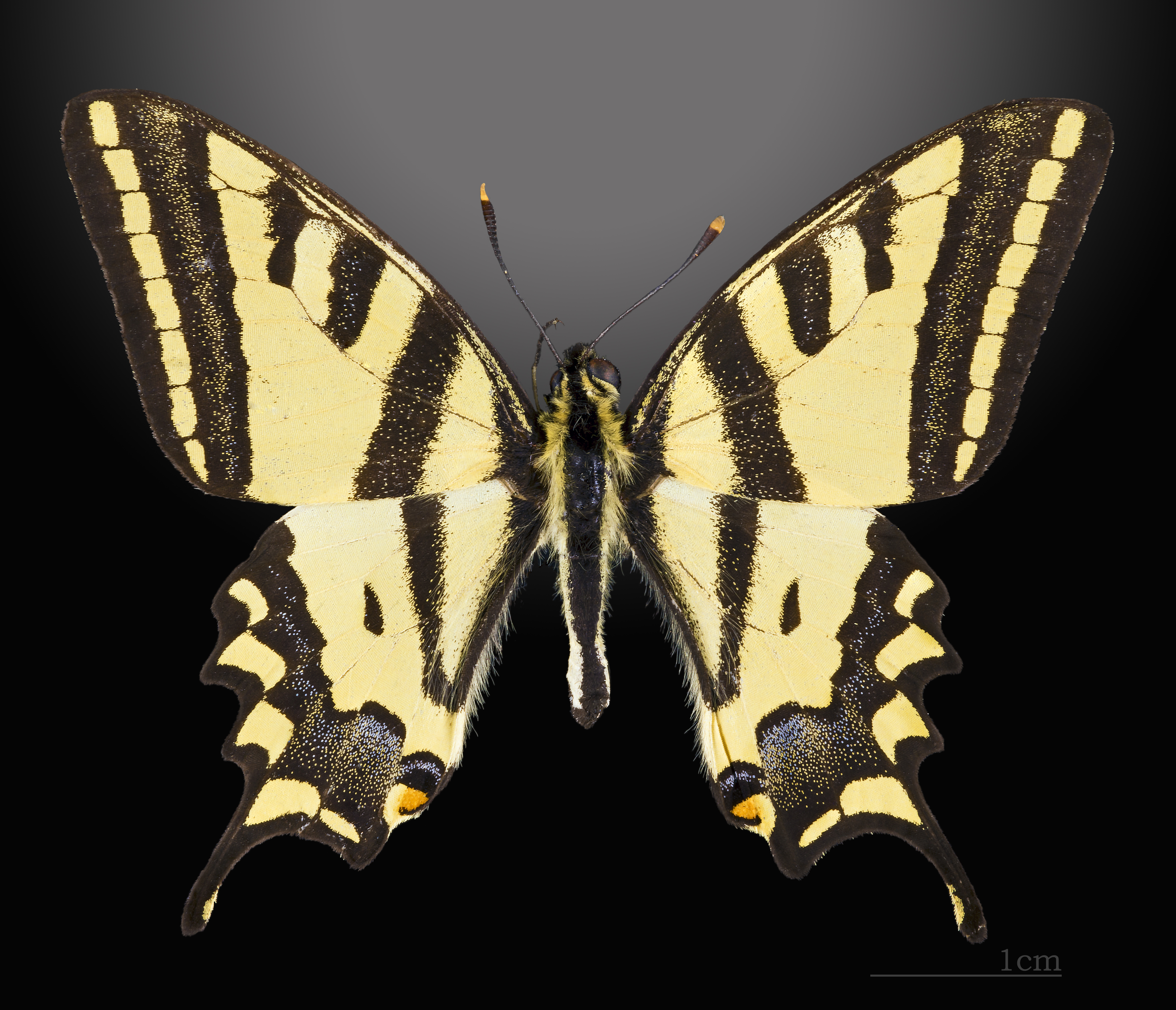
Dorsal view

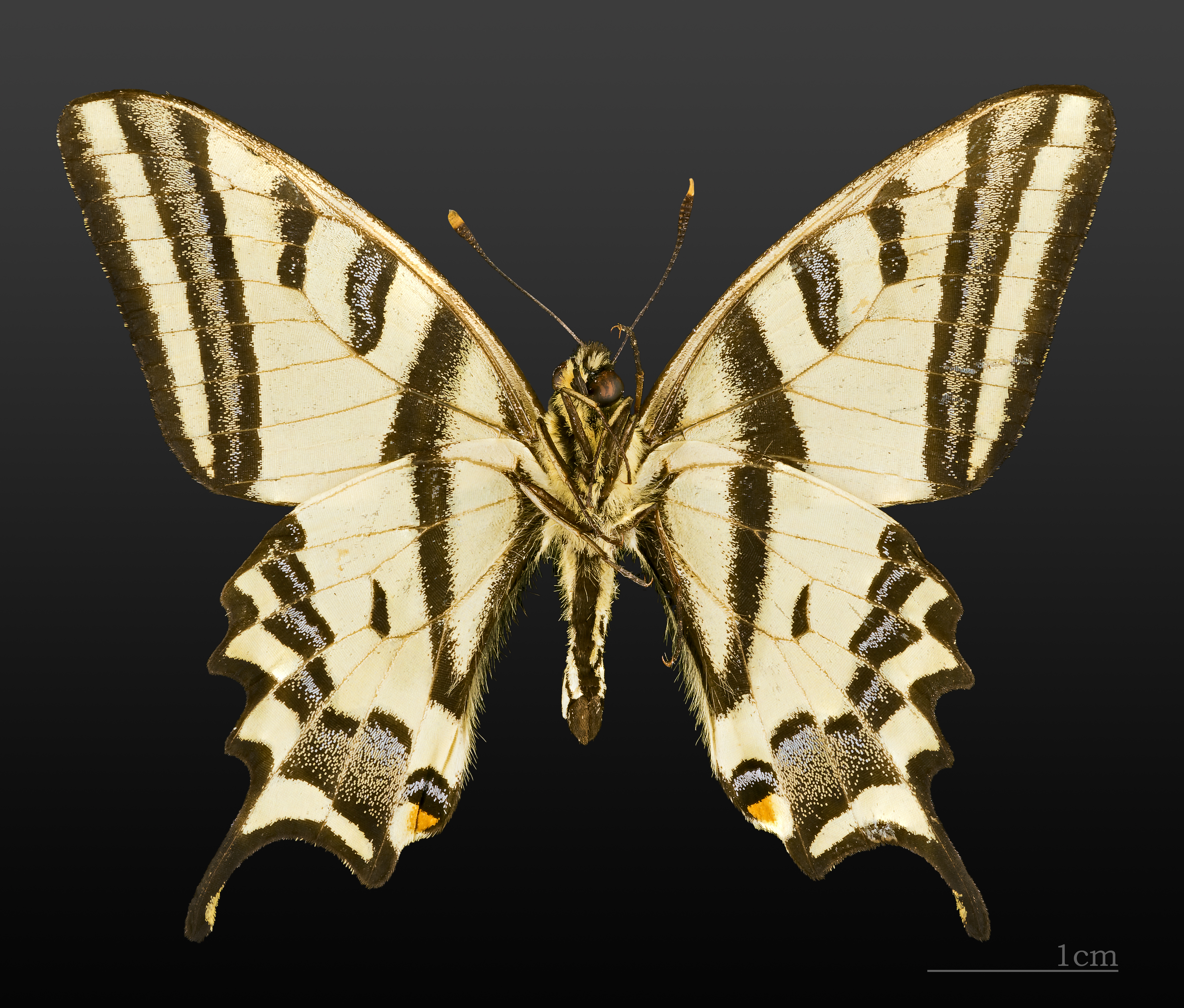
Ventral view

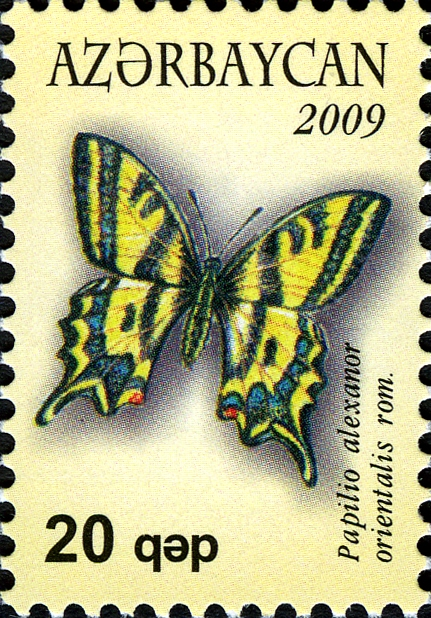
On an Azerbaijan stamp

== Description ==
Papilio alexanor is similar to Papilio machaon, however, the basal third of the forewing is not entirely black, but bordered basally and distally by a broad black band. The bands are continued across the hindwing, bordering also here the yellow basal area.

The larva is similar to that of P. machaon but more variegated, the red dots larger and brighter; it is easy to find, since the stalks of the plants on which it feeds become white, the epidermis being gnawed. Pupa are stone grey, very flat, with carinate sides and uneven surface; fastened on stones and resembling a small stone splinter.

== Subspecies ==
- Papilio alexanor destelensis (Nel & Chauliac, 1983) Southern France
- Papilio alexanor hazarajatica (Wyatt, 1961) Kopet-Dagh south Ghissar
- Papilio alexanor judeus (Staudinger, 1893) Asia Minor, Judea, Transcaucasia - Has broader black bands, especially in the basal area.
- Papilio alexanor orientalis (Romanov, 1884) Armenia - Larger than the European form and has on the whole narrower black bands, only the submarginal band of the hindwing being broadly blue.
- Papilio alexanor radighierii (Sala & Bollino, 1991) Piedmont, Italy
- Papilio alexanor voldemar (Kreuzberg, 1989) west Tian-Shan

== Biology ==
The larva feeds on Umbelliferae, notably Trinia vulgaris, Seseli montanum, Ptychotis saxifraga, Opopanax chironium, and a number of Ferula species.

== Protection ==
It is a protected species.
