= Hol =

HOL, HoL or Hol may refer to:

== Places ==
- Hol, Norway, in Buskerud county
- Hol Municipality (Nordland), a former municipality in Norway
- Hol, Tjeldsund, Norway
- Hol, Ludhiana, Punjab, India
- Hol, a community in Duk County in Jonglei State in South Sudan

== Science and technology ==
- HOL (proof assistant), a family of interactive theorem proving systems
- Head-of-line blocking in computer networking
- Higher-order logic in mathematics and logic
- Holonomy, mathematical symbol Hol, in differential geometry

== Sports ==
- Hol IL, a sports club in Buskerud county, Norway
- Hollingworth Lake Rowing Club, England, boat code HOL
- Holdsworth (cycling team), UCI code HOL
- HOL (IOC country code), 1968–1988 code for the Netherlands

== Transportation ==
- Hol Station, Hol Norway
- Hol station, on the Udhna–Jalgaon line, India
- Hollywood station (Florida), U.S., station code HOL
- Holmesglen railway station, Melbourne, Australia, station code HOL
- Holsworthy railway station, Sydney, Australia, station code HOL
- Holton Heath railway station, England, station code HOL

== Other uses ==
- Hol (surname), including a list of people with the name
- HoL (role-playing game)
- Hands On Learning Australia, a charity
- Hellas Online (hol), a Greek telephony and Internet service provider
- Holiday Airlines (US airline) (ICAO airline code HOL)
- Holu language, ISO 639 language hol
- HOL (ITU letter code) for the Netherlands
- House of Lords (HoL), the upper chamber in the UK Parliament

== See also ==
- Hol Church (disambiguation)
- HOI (disambiguation)
- Holl, a surname
