= Hoel (surname) =

Hoel is a Norwegian surname. Notable people with the surname include:

- Adolf Hoel (1879–1964), Norwegian geologist and polar researcher
- Arne Hoel (1927–2006), Norwegian ski jumper
- Brit Hoel (born 1942), Norwegian politician
- Gudmund Hoel (1877–1956), Norwegian architect
- Jørn Hoel (born 1957), Norwegian composer, guitarist and singer
- J.C. Hoel (1904–1989), American co-founder of the Sturgis Motorcycle Rally
- Nils Astrup Hoel (1899–1986), Norwegian businessperson
- Oddmund Hoel (1910–1983), Norwegian politician
- Pearl Hoel (1905–2005), American co-founder of the Sturgis Motorcycle Rally
- Sigrun Hoel (born 1951), Norwegian lawyer, academic, government official and feminist
- Sigurd Hoel (1890–1960), Norwegian author
- William R. Hoel (1824–1879), American Civil War Union Navy officer
- Richard Hol (1825–1904), Dutch composer and conductor

== See also ==
- Hoel (disambiguation)
- Hol (surname)
