= Hols =

Hols may refer to:

- Hols: Prince of the Sun, a Japanese anime film
- Holidays
- House of Large Sizes, an American alternative rock band

== See also ==
- Hol (disambiguation)
