= Hoel (disambiguation) =

Hoel is a king of Brittany in the Arthurian legend.

Hoel may also refer to:

== People ==
- Hoël I, Duke of Brittany (reigned 960–981)
- Hoël II, Duke of Brittany (c.1031–1084)
- Hoel, Count of Nantes (died 1156)
- Hoel (surname)

== Other uses ==
- USS Hoel, several U.S. Navy ships named after William Hoel
- Hoel Mountains, Antarctica
- Hoel Glacier, Greenland
