= Hoi =

HOI or Hoi may refer to:

- Home insurance, or homeowners insurance (HOI)
- Hypoiodous acid, chemical formula HOI
- Carsten Høi (born 1957), Danish chess Grandmaster

== Places ==
- Hoi District, Aichi, Japan
- Hao Airport, French Polynesia, IATA code HOI

== Video games ==
- Hoi (video game), 1992
- Hearts of Iron (HOI) a grand strategy video game series by Paradox Development Studio
  - Hearts of Iron (HOI), a 2002 video game and the first entry in the eponymous video game series
  - Hearts of Iron II (HOI2), a 2005 video game
  - Hearts of Iron III (HOI3), a 2009 video game
  - Hearts of Iron IV (HOI4), a 2016 video game and the latest entry in the series

== See also ==
- H0i, or H0f, a rail transport modelling scale
- HO-1 (disambiguation), including HO1
- H1 (disambiguation), including H01
- Hoe (food), various Korean raw fish dishes
- Hoi polloi
- Holl, a surname
- Oi (interjection)
