= USS Hoel =

Three ships of the United States Navy have borne the name USS Hoel in honor of William R. Hoel, a naval officer in the American Civil War:

- USS Hoel (DD-533), a Fletcher-class destroyer commissioned in 1943 and sunk in 1944 during the Battle off Samar
- USS Hoel (DD-768), a Gearing-class destroyer canceled during construction on 13 September 1946
- USS Hoel (DDG-13), a Charles F. Adams-class destroyer commissioned in 1962 and struck in 1992
