= Hol (surname) =

Hol is a surname. Notable people with the surname include:

- Dag Hol (born 1951), Norwegian painter
- Diederik Hol (born 1972), Dutch designer
- Erik Hol (born 1985), Dutch darts player
- Jacoba Hol (1886–1964), physical geographer; daughter of Richard Hol
- Jon Hol (1851–1941), Norwegian engineer and activist
- Petter Hol (1883–1981), Norwegian gymnast
- Richard Hol (1825–1904), Dutch composer and conductor

== See also ==
- Kʼinich Popol Hol (died 470), Mayan leader
- Hol (disambiguation)
- Hoel (surname)
