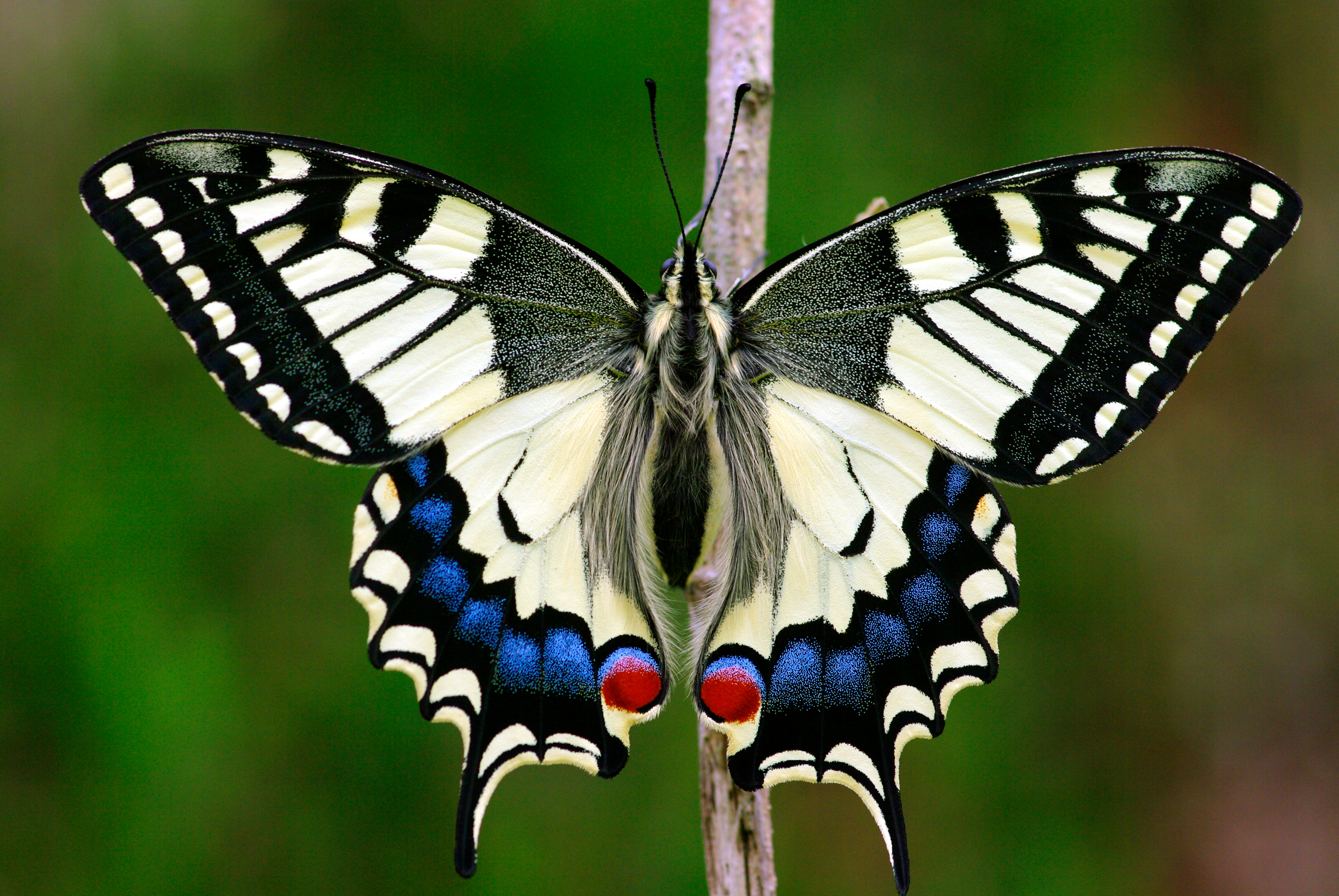
- Dorsal side, recently emerged from its chrysalis, France
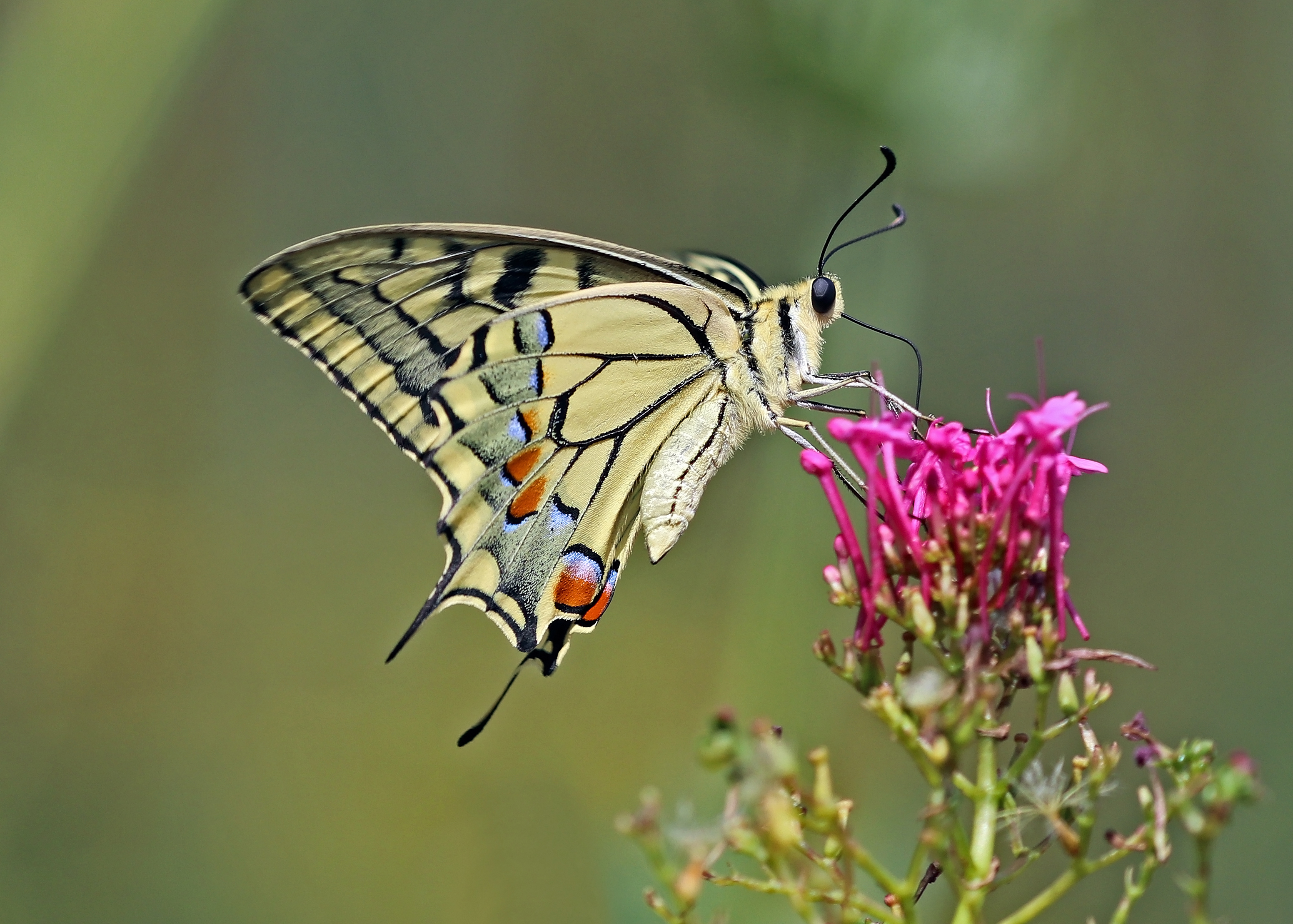
- Ventral side of P. m. gorganus, Italy

Conservation status
- Secure (NatureServe)

Scientific classification
- Kingdom: Animalia
- Phylum: Arthropoda
- Clade: Pancrustacea
- Class: Insecta
- Order: Lepidoptera
- Family: Papilionidae
- Genus: Papilio
- Species: P. machaon

Binomial name
- Papilio machaon Linnaeus, 1758

Synonyms
- List: Papilio machaon var. marginalis Robbe, 1891; Papilio machaon ab. nigrofasciata Rothke, 1895; Papilio machaon ab. niger Heyne, [1895]; Papilio machaon var. aurantiaca Speyer, 1858; Papilio machaon var. asiatica Ménétriés, 1855; Papilio hippocrates C. & R. Felder, 1864; Papilio machaon var. micado Pagenstecher, 1875; Papilio bairdii Edwards, 1866; Papilio asterius var. utahensis Strecker, 1878; Papilio hollandii Edwards, 1892; Papilio aliaska Scudder, 1869; Papilio machaon joannisi Verity, [1907]; Papilio machaon petersii Clark, 1932; Papilio hippocrates var. oregonia Edwards, 1876; Papilio ladakensis Moore, 1884; Papilio sikkimensis Moore, 1884; Papilio machaon var. centralis Staudinger, 1886; Papilio brucei Edwards, 1893; Papilio brucei Edwards, 1895; Papilio machaon dodi McDunnough, 1939; Papilio machaon var. montanus Alphéraky, 1897; Papilio machaon alpherakyi Bang-Haas, 1933; Papilio machaon minschani Bang-Haas; Papilio machaon chinensomandschuriensis Eller, 1939; Papilio machaon hieromax Hemming, 1934; Papilio machaon mauretanica Verity, 1905; Papilio machaon var. mauretanica Blachier, 1908; Papilio machaon var. mauretanica Holl, 1910; Papilio machaon var. asiatica ab. caerulescens Holl, 1910; Papilio machaon var. asiatica ab. djezïrensis Holl, 1910; Papilio sphyrus Hübner, [1823]; Papilio machaon machaon maxima Verity, 1911; Papilio machaon maxima gen.aest. angulata Verity, 1911; Papilio machaon f. chrysostoma Chnéour, 1934; Papilio machaon f. archias Fruhstorfer, 1907; Papilio machaon chishimana Matsumura, 1928; Papilio machaon sylvia Esaki, 1930; Papilio machaon venchuanus Moonen; Papilio machaon schantungensis Eller, 1936

= Papilio machaon =

Old World swallowtail

Species of insect

Papilio machaon, the Old World swallowtail, is a butterfly of the family Papilionidae. The butterfly is also known as the common yellow swallowtail or simply the swallowtail (a common name applied to all members of the family, but this species was the first to be given the name). It is the type species of the genus Papilio. This widespread species is found in much of the Palearctic and in North America.

== Etymology ==
This species is named after Machaon (Ancient Greek: Μαχάων, romanized: Makháōn) a figure in Greek mythology. He was a son of Asclepius in the works of Homer.

== Taxonomy ==
Papilio machaon was named by Carl Linnaeus in the 10th edition of Systema Naturae in 1758, alongside nearly 200 other species of butterfly. Later, Pierre André Latreille designated it as the type species of the genus Papilio.

== Subspecies ==
There are 41 recognized subspecies, that include:

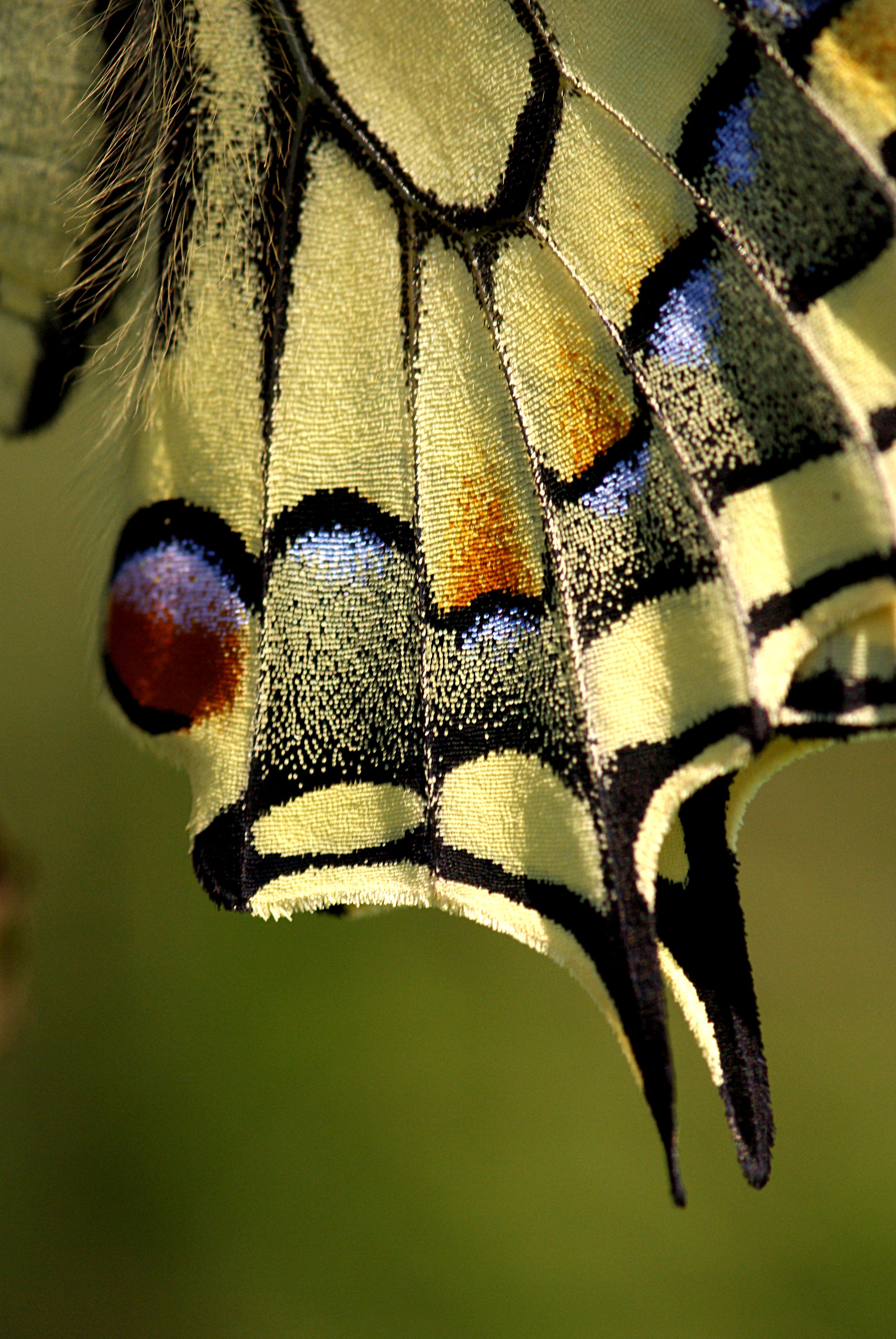
Trailing edges of the hindwings resemble the tails of swallows

- P. m. aliaska Scudder, 1869 (Chukot Peninsula, Alaska to northern British Columbia)
- P. m. annae Gistel, 1857
- P. m. archias Fruhstorfer, 1907 (southern Sichuan)
- P. m. asiaticus Ménétriés, 1855
- P. m. baijangensis Huang & Murayama, 1992 (China: Xinjiang)
- P. m. bairdii Edwards, 1866 (California east to Colorado, New Mexico & Wyoming, perhaps into northern Mexico)
- P. m. birmanicus Rothschild, 1908 (southern Shan States)
- P. m. britannicus (Seitz, 1907) (Great Britain)
- P. m. brucei Edwards, 1893 (Alberta, Saskatchewan to Nebraska, Utah)
- P. m. centralis Staudinger, 1886 (Turan, western Tian-Shan, Ghissar, Darvaz, Alai, western Pamirs)
- P. m. chinensis Verity, 1905 (Sichuan)
- P. m. gorganus Fruhstorfer, 1922 (southern Europe, Ural, Caucasus Major)
- P. m. hippocrates C. & R. Felder, 1864 (Japan)
- P. m. hudsonianus Clark, 1932 (Alberta to Quebec)
- P. m. kamtschadalus Alphéraky, 1897 (Kamchatka)
- P. m. kiyonobu Morita, 1997 (Tibet)
- P. m. kunkalaschani Eller, 1939 (western Sichuan)
- P. m. ladakensis Moore, 1884 (eastern Pamirs)
- P. m. lapponica Verity, 1911 (northern Europe)
- P. m. machaon (Central Europe)
- P. m. mauretanica Verity, 1905 (North Africa)
- P. m. maxima gen.aest. angulata Verity, 1911
- P. m. melitensis Eller, 1936 (Malta)
- P. m. montanus Alphéraky, 1897 (western Sichuan, south-western Gansu, eastern Qinghai, north-western Yunnan)
- P. m. muetingi Seyer, 1976 (southern Arabia, United Arab Emirates)
- P. m. neochinensis Sheljuzhko, 1913 (Ta-tsien-lu)
- P. m. oregonius Edwards, 1876 (southern British Columbia to Oregon, Idaho)
- P. m. oreinus Sheljuzhko, 1919 (Tian-Shan)
- P. m. orientis Verity, 1911 (Altai, Sayan, Transbaikalia, northern Amur, Far East)
- P. m. pikei Sperling, 1987 (Quebec, British Columbia)
- P. m. sachalinensis Matsumura, 1911 (Sakhalin)
- P. m. schapiroi Seyer, 1976 (southern Ussuri)
- P. m. septentrionalis Verity, 1911 (Kurils)
- P. m. sikkimensis Moore, 1884 (Tibet)
- P. m. suroia Tytler, 1939 (Manipur, Assam, northeastern India)
- P. m. sylvina Hemming, 1933 (Taiwan)
- P. m. syriacus Verity, 1908 (Caucasus Minor, Armenia, Talysh Mountains)
- P. m. taliensis Eller, 1939 (northern Yunnan)
- P. m. ussuriensis Sheljuzhko, 1910 (southern Amur, northern and central Ussuri)
- P. m. verityi Fruhstorfer, 1907 (northern Burma, Shan States, southern Yunnan)
- P. m. weidenhofferi Seyer, 1976 (Kopet-Dagh)

Papilio machaon gorganus is strongly migratory in Europe and may be found in almost all habitats. In the UK, P. m. britannicus is an endemic subspecies, but occasionally individuals of the continental subspecies P. m. gorganus breed temporarily on the south coast. Subspecies P. m. britannicus differs from the continental subspecies in being more heavily marked in black. The Maltese Islands are home to another endemic subspecies, P. m. melitensis.

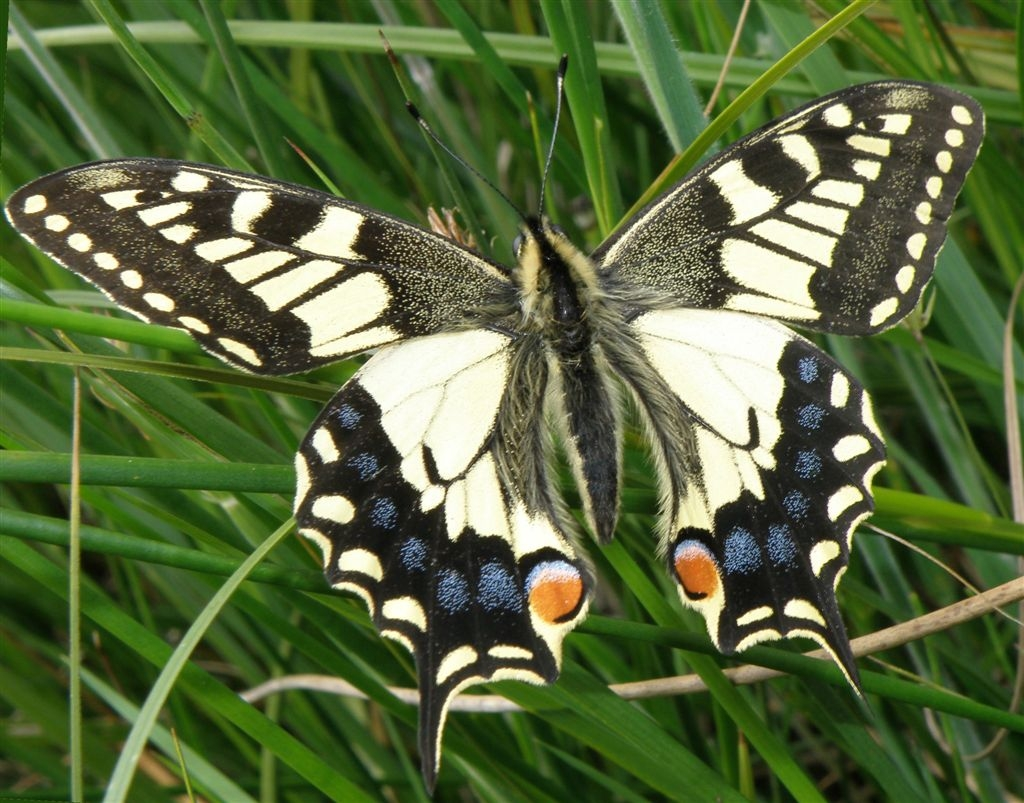
P. m. britannicus

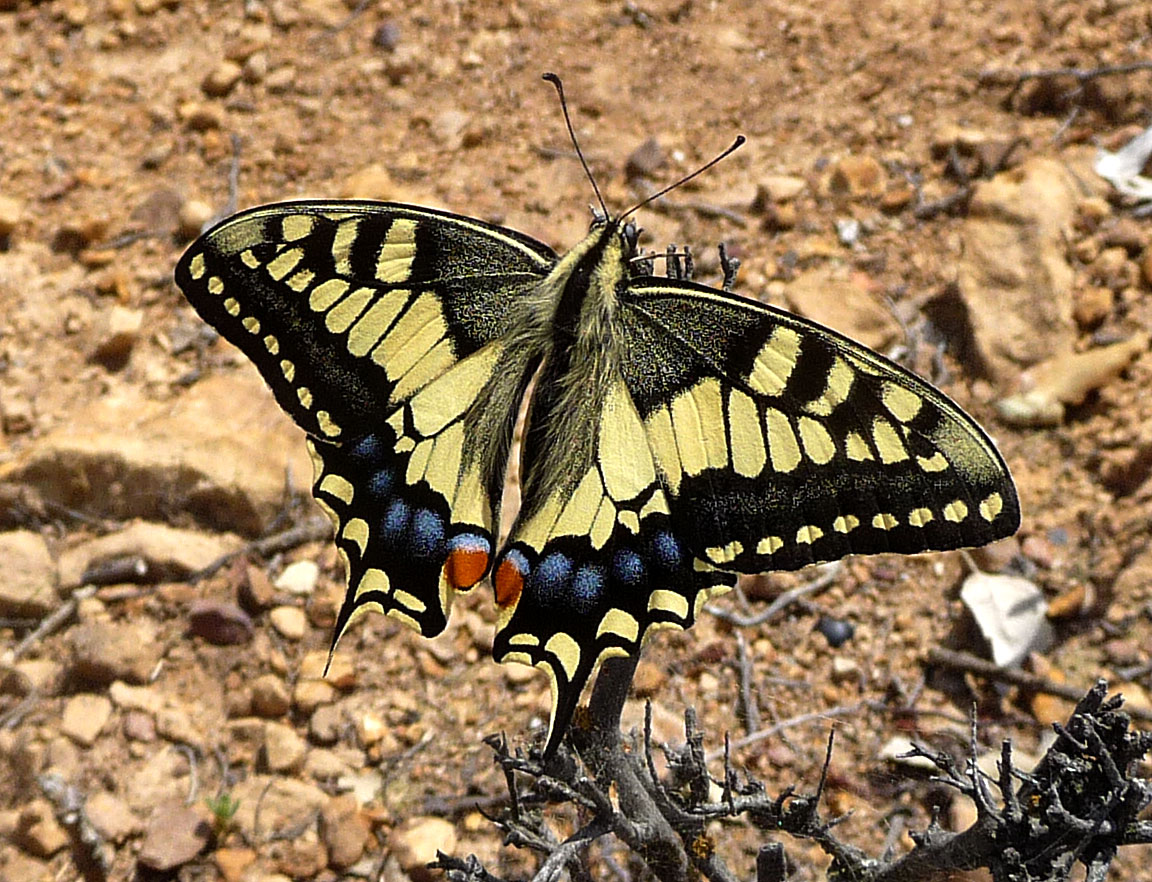
P. m. gorganus

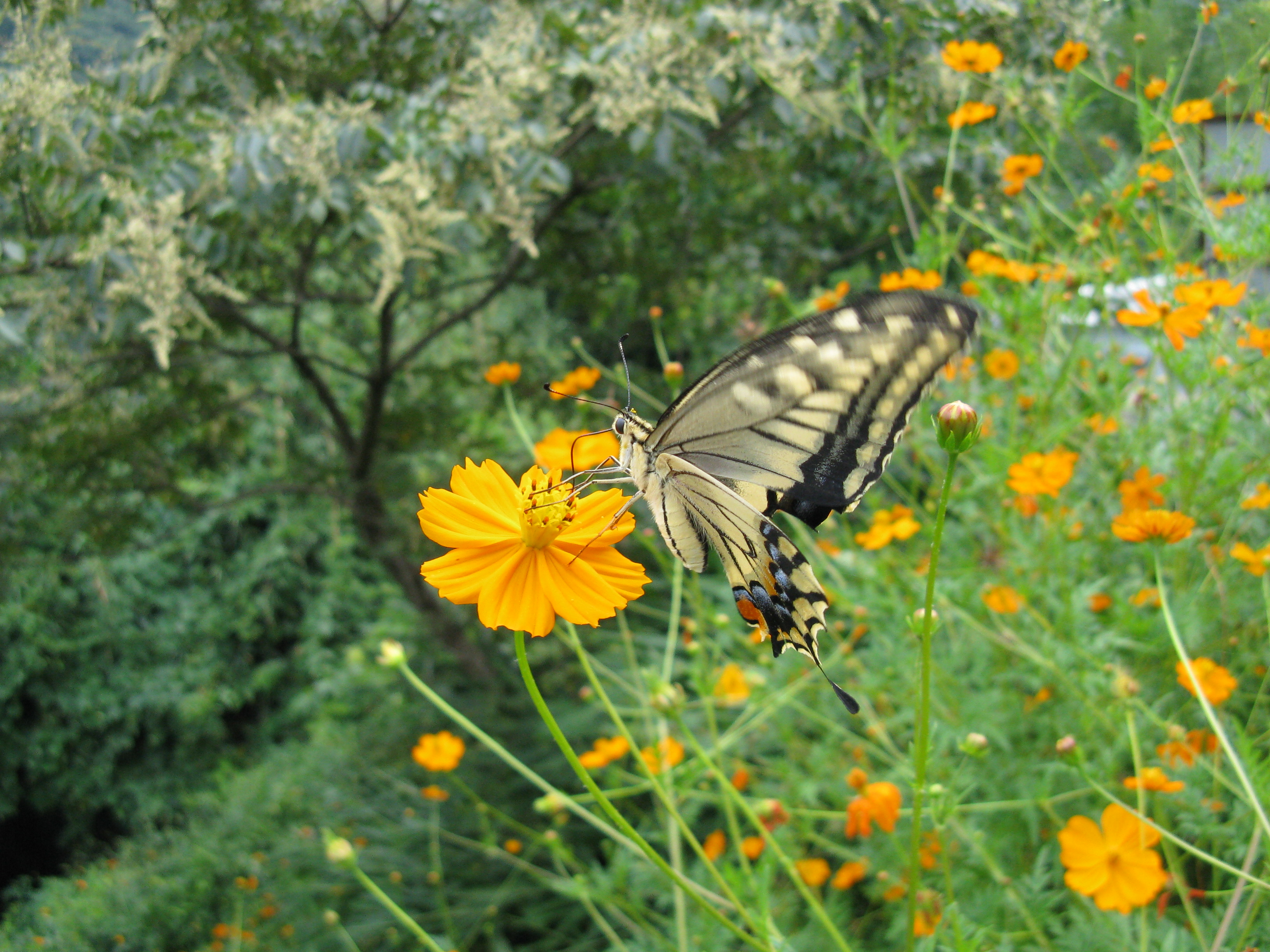
P. m. hippocrates

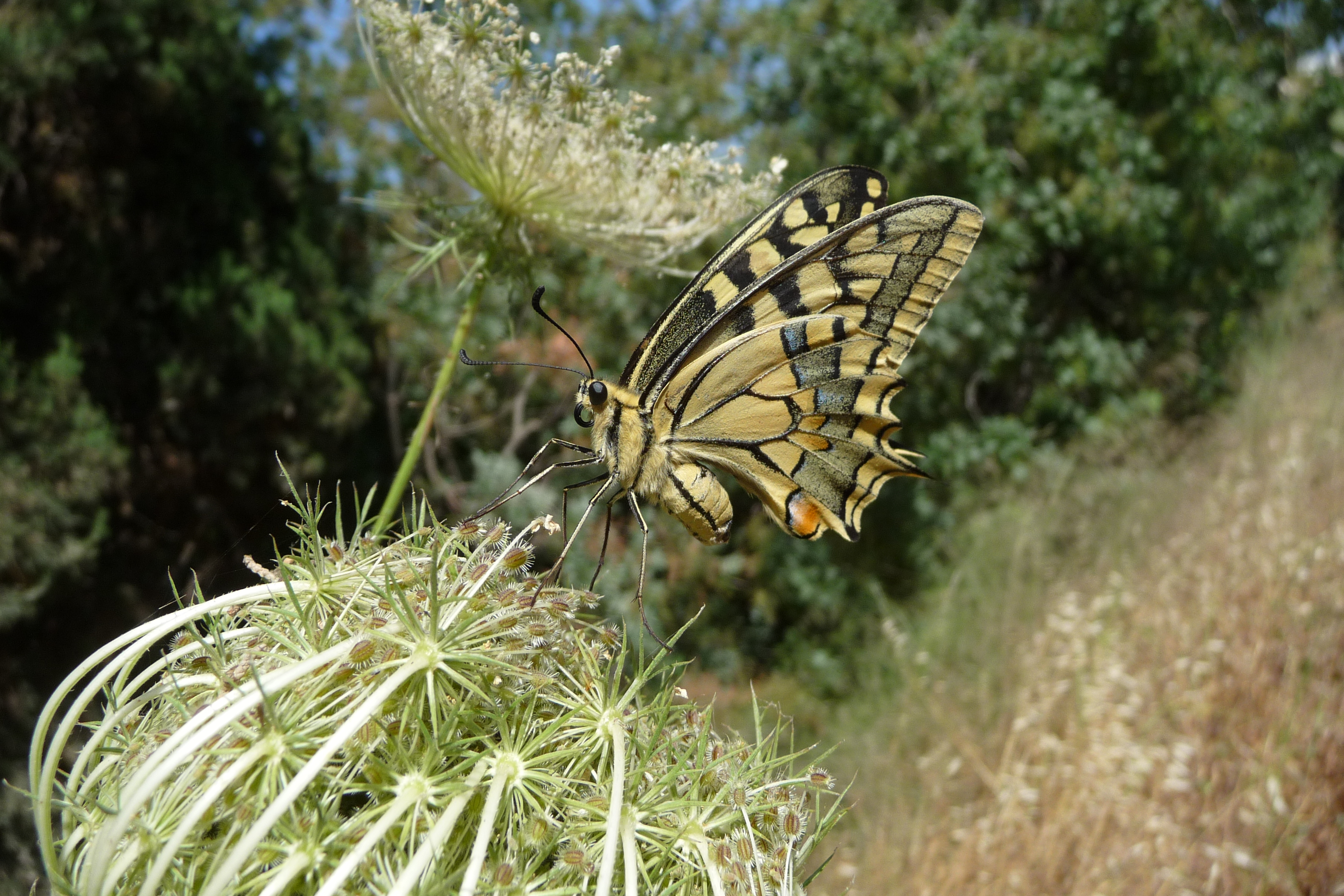
P. m. syriacus

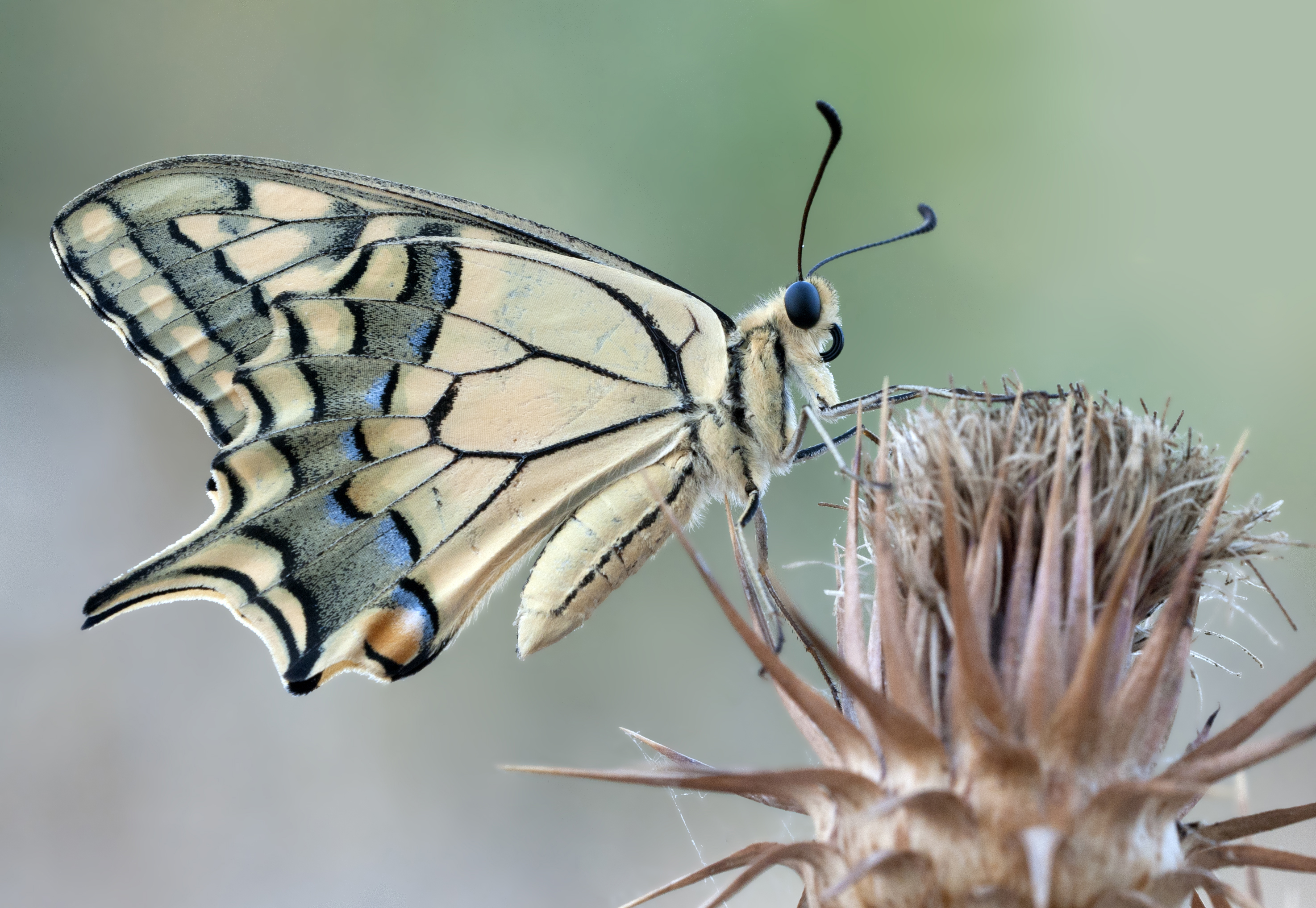
In Turkey

== Distribution and status ==
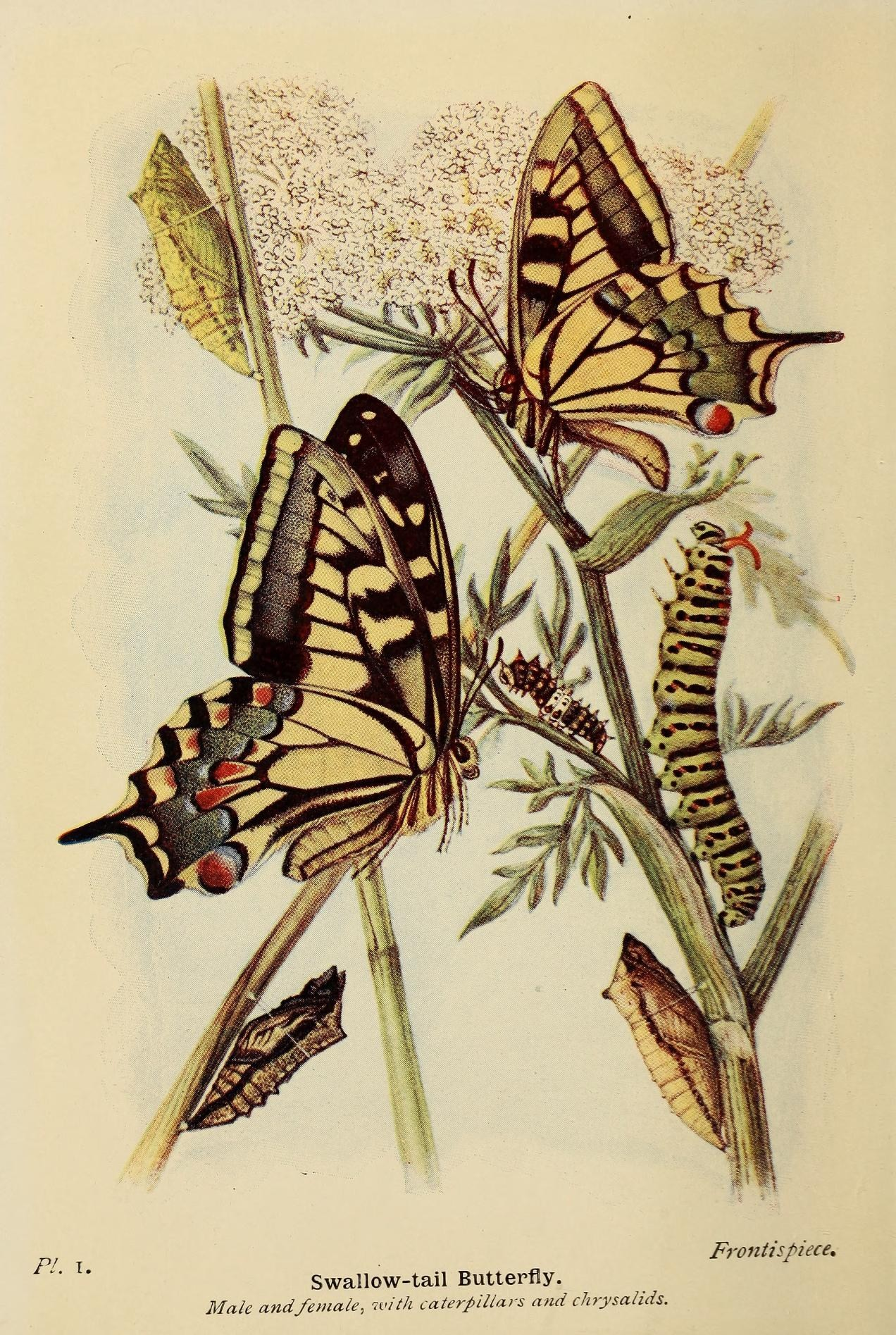
Illustration from The butterflies of the British Isles

in Japan

This butterfly is present throughout the entire Palearctic region, ranging from Russia to China and Japan, (including the Himalayas and Taiwan), and across into Alaska, Canada, and the United States, and thus, is not restricted to the Old World, despite the common name. In Asia, it is reported as far south as Saudi Arabia, Oman, the high mountains of Yemen, Lebanon, Iran and Israel. In southern Asia, it occurs in Pakistan and Kashmir, northern India (Sikkim, to Assam, and Arunachal Pradesh), Nepal, Bhutan, and northern Myanmar.

This butterfly is widespread in Europe. In the United Kingdom, it is limited to a few areas in the Norfolk Broads of East Anglia. It is the UK's largest resident butterfly. The monarch (Danaus plexippus) is slightly larger, but is only a rare vagrant.

As P. machaon is widespread throughout Eurasia and often common, it is not threatened as a species. It is listed as "vulnerable" in the South Korean and Austrian Red Data Books, and in the Red Data Book of the former Soviet Union. In Armenia the species demonstrates stable population trend and is assessed as Least Concern.

In some countries, P. machaon and its subspecies are protected by law. Papilio machaon machaon is protected by law in six provinces of Austria, Czech Republic, Slovakia, Hungary, Romania, and Moldova. The species is protected in the United Kingdom, and subspecies verityi is protected in India.

In late 2017, P. machaon was among several species of butterflies selected by the Estonian Society of Lepidopterists as contenders for the National Butterfly of Estonia. Nearly 5,000 members of the public voted online, with P. machaon receiving 2,664 votes, overwhelmingly winning the title. As well as becoming the National Butterfly of Estonia, P. machaon was named as the Butterfly of the Year for 2018; an honorary title given to a native butterfly species in Estonia annually.

== Description ==
The imago typically has yellow wings with black vein markings, and a wingspan of 65–86 millimetres (2.6–3.4 in). The hindwings of both sexes have a pair of protruding tails which give the butterfly its common name from the resemblance to the birds of the same name. Just below each tail is one red and six blue eye spots.

In the caterpillar stage, P. machaon has a length of 45 millimetres (1.8 in). When young, the caterpillar resembles a bird dropping, giving it camouflage. The caterpillar also protects itself using a large orange fork which protrudes behind its head.

It can be distinguished from Papilio hospiton, which occurs sympatrically with it on Corsica and Sardinia, by the longer "tails" on the hindwings. It can be told apart from the Algerian species Papilio saharae only by counting the segments on the antennae.

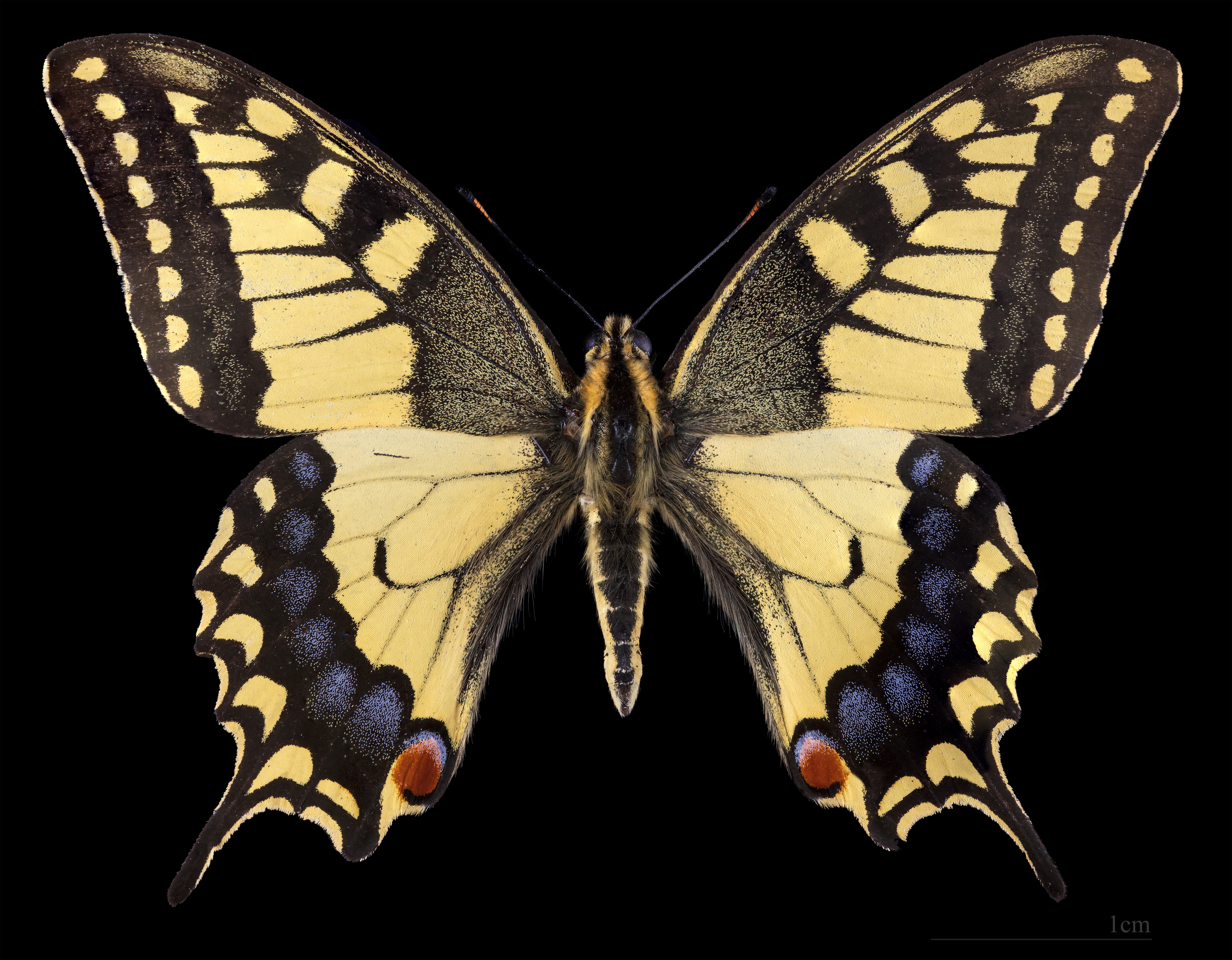
♂

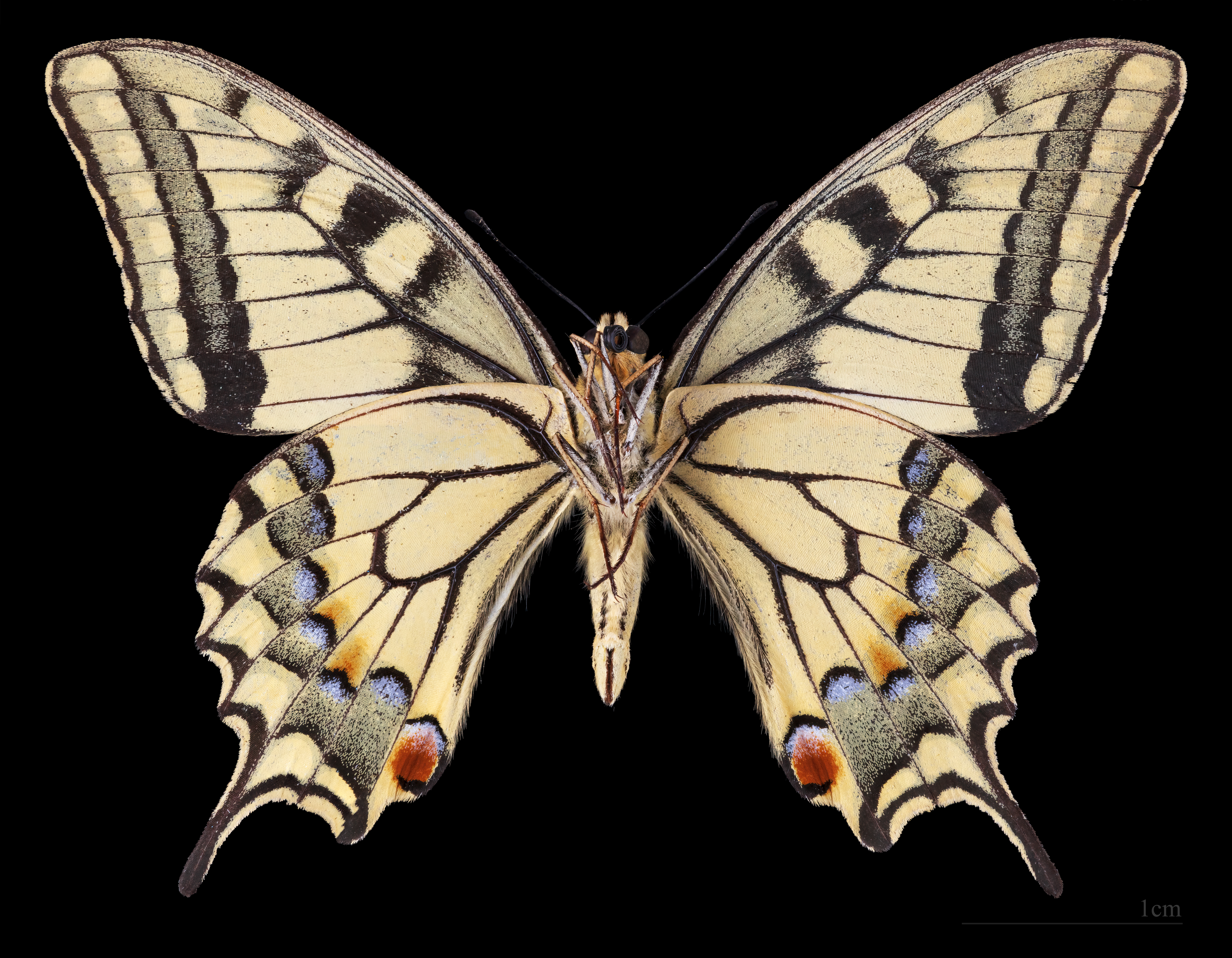
♂ △

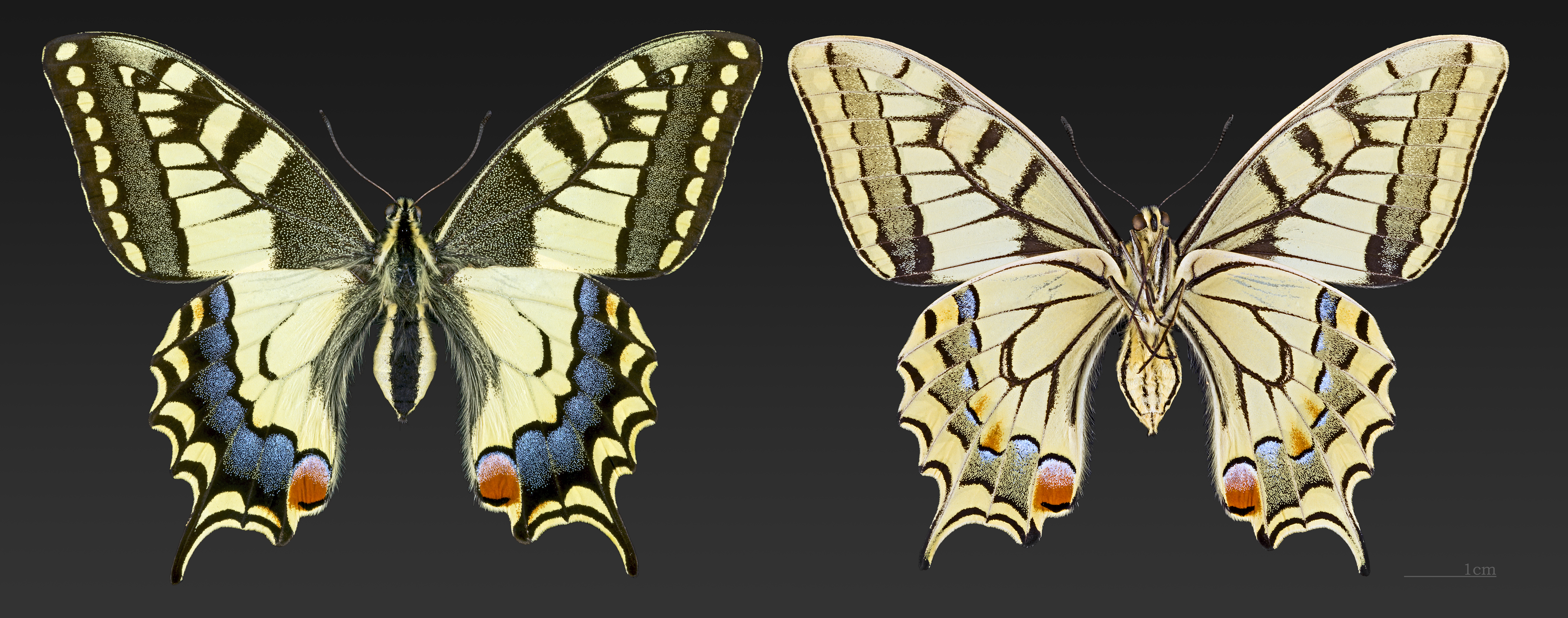
♀ Top (L) and bottom (R) sides, (MHNT)

== Ecology ==
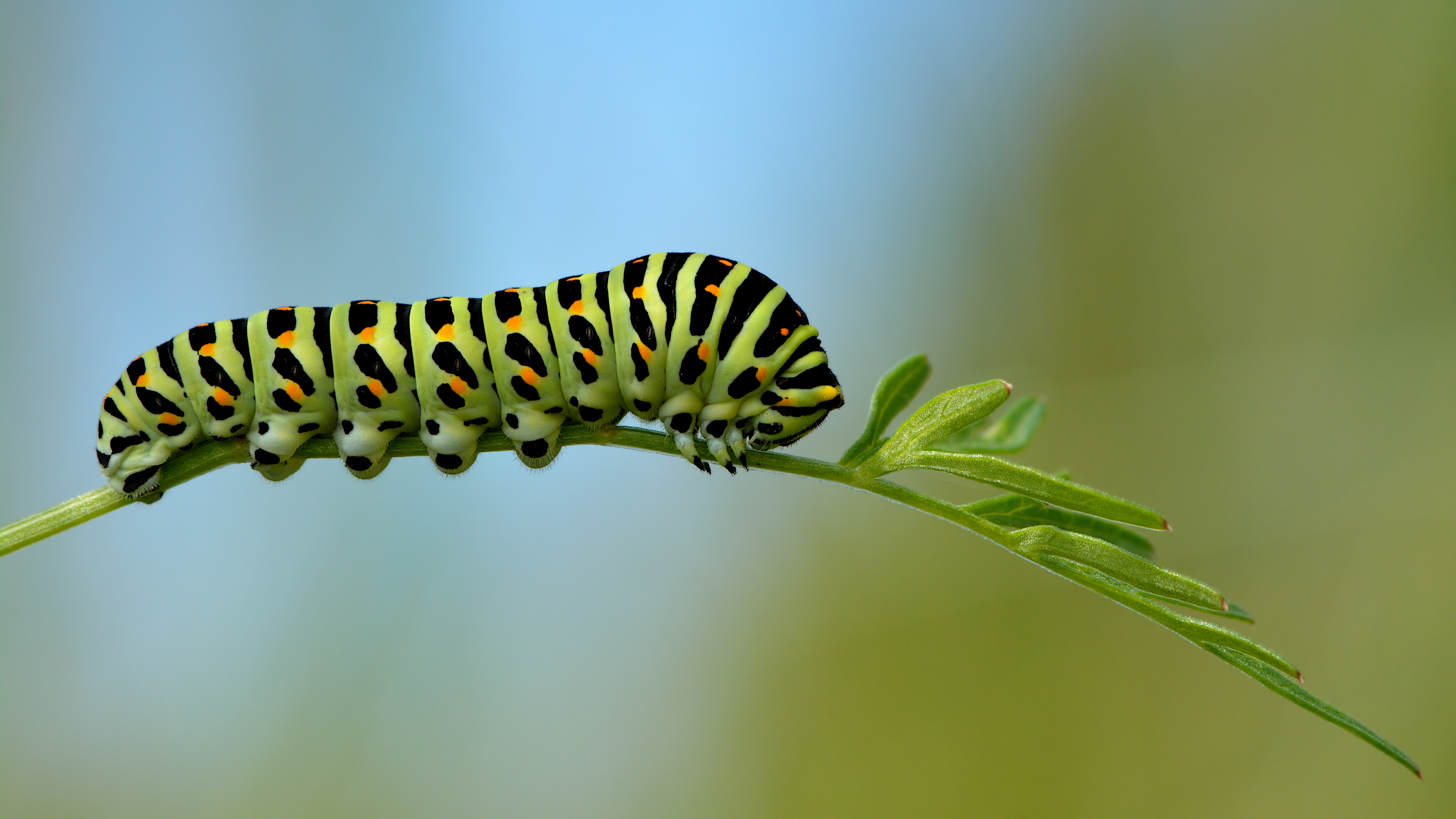
Caterpillar on wild carrot

The butterfly has a strong and fast flight, but frequently pauses to hover over flowering herbs and sip nectar. It frequents alpine meadows and hillsides, and males are fond of 'hilltopping', congregating near summits to compete for passing females. At lower elevations, it can be seen visiting gardens.

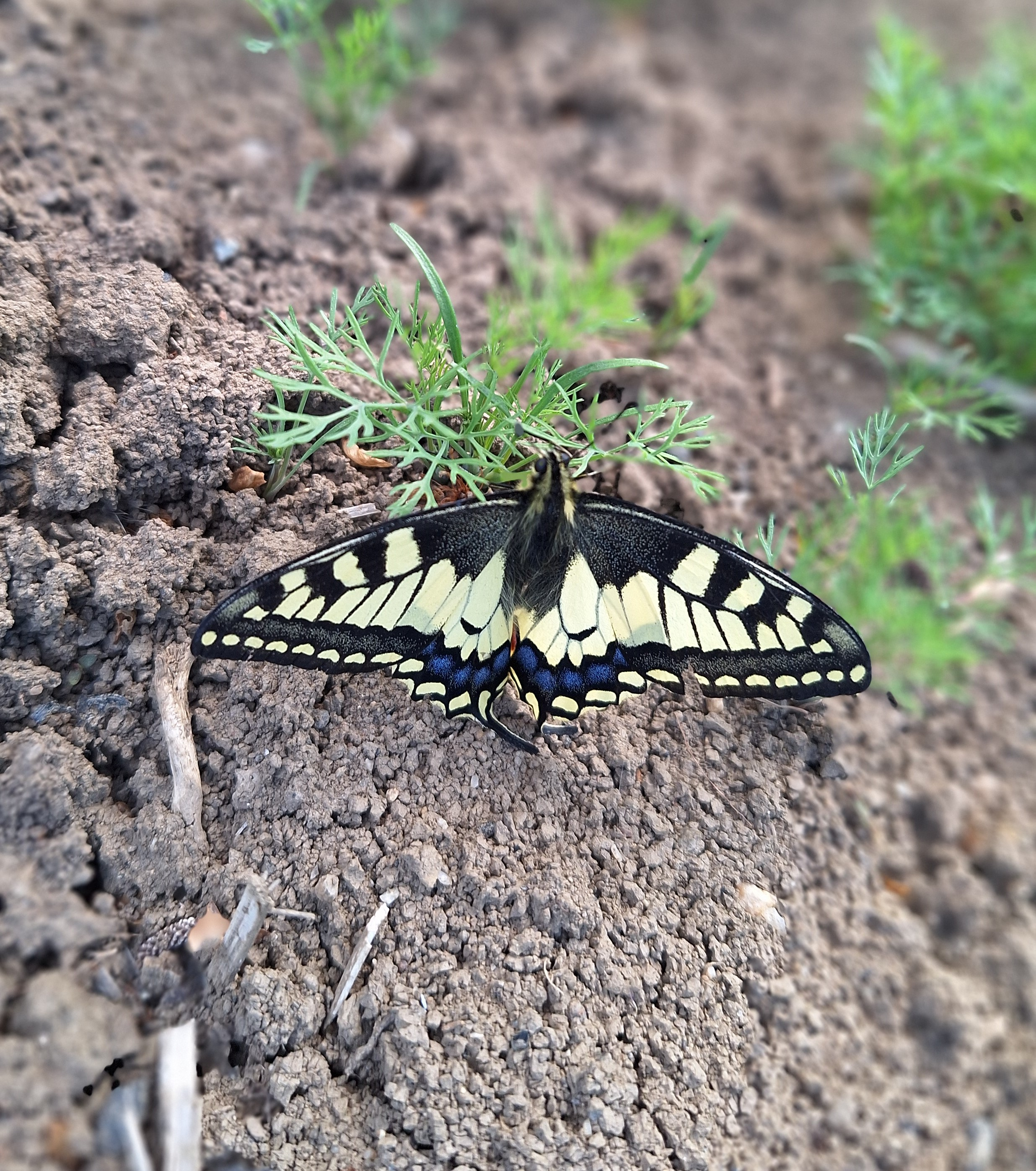
A female P. machaon on a young dill sprout in a garden. In continental Europe, cultivated dill is a frequent host plant for the spring generation.

In Central Europe, the species frequently colonizes cultural landscapes and domestic gardens where host plants are available. Female butterflies are often observed ovipositing on young sprouts of cultivated umbellifers such as dill (Anethum graveolens) or parsley (Petroselinum crispum), even in early spring (April). These plants provide a high-quality nutritional source for the first generation of caterpillars.

Unlike other swallowtails which specialise on Rutaceae, this species mostly feeds on plants of family Umbelliferae, females laying eggs singly. Milk parsley (also known as marsh hog's fennel) is normally the only food plant used by the caterpillars of the British subspecies. The food plants of the swallowtail in Europe, Asia, and North America are more varied than in the UK. It uses a wide variety of umbellifers including wild carrot (Daucus carota), wild angelica (Angelica sylvestris), fennel (Foeniculum vulgare), and hogweeds (Heracleum). In the Maltese Islands, the caterpillar feeds on plants such as rue (Ruta chalepensis) in addition to Umbelliferae such as fennel.

In Kashmir, the common yellow swallowtail, as Papilio machaon is called there, inhabits alpine meadows in the Himalayas occurring from 2,000 feet (610 m) in Kashmir valley to 16,000 ft (4,900 m) in the Garhwal Himalayas. In India, in Himachal Pradesh, it is found over 4,000 ft (1,200 m) only and in Sikkim over 8,000 ft (2,400 m) only.

At lower elevations, these butterflies fly from March to September; at higher elevations, they are limited by the short summer seasons.

The British subspecies P. m. brittanicus is less mobile than its European continental counterpart and stays within, or close by, its fenland habitat.

== Life cycle ==
There are usually two to three broods in a year, but in northern areas, the species may be univoltine. In some places such as the UK, some will pupate and emerge in the same year and others will overwinter as pupae before emerging the following year, a situation known as being partially bivoltine.

The caterpillar spends the first part of its life with the appearance of a bird dropping, an effective defense against predators. As the caterpillar grows larger, it becomes green with black and orange markings. It has a defense against predators in the form of an osmeterium, which consists of retractable, fleshy projections behind its head that can release a foul smell if disturbed, which deters insects, but not birds.

Life cycle of Papilio machaon

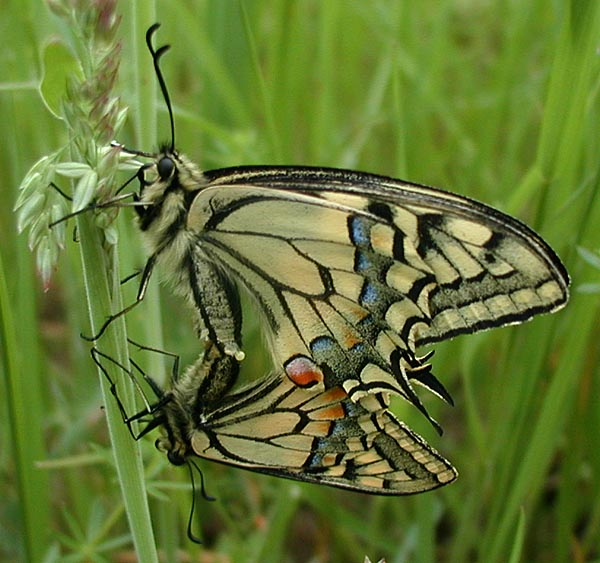
Mating pair

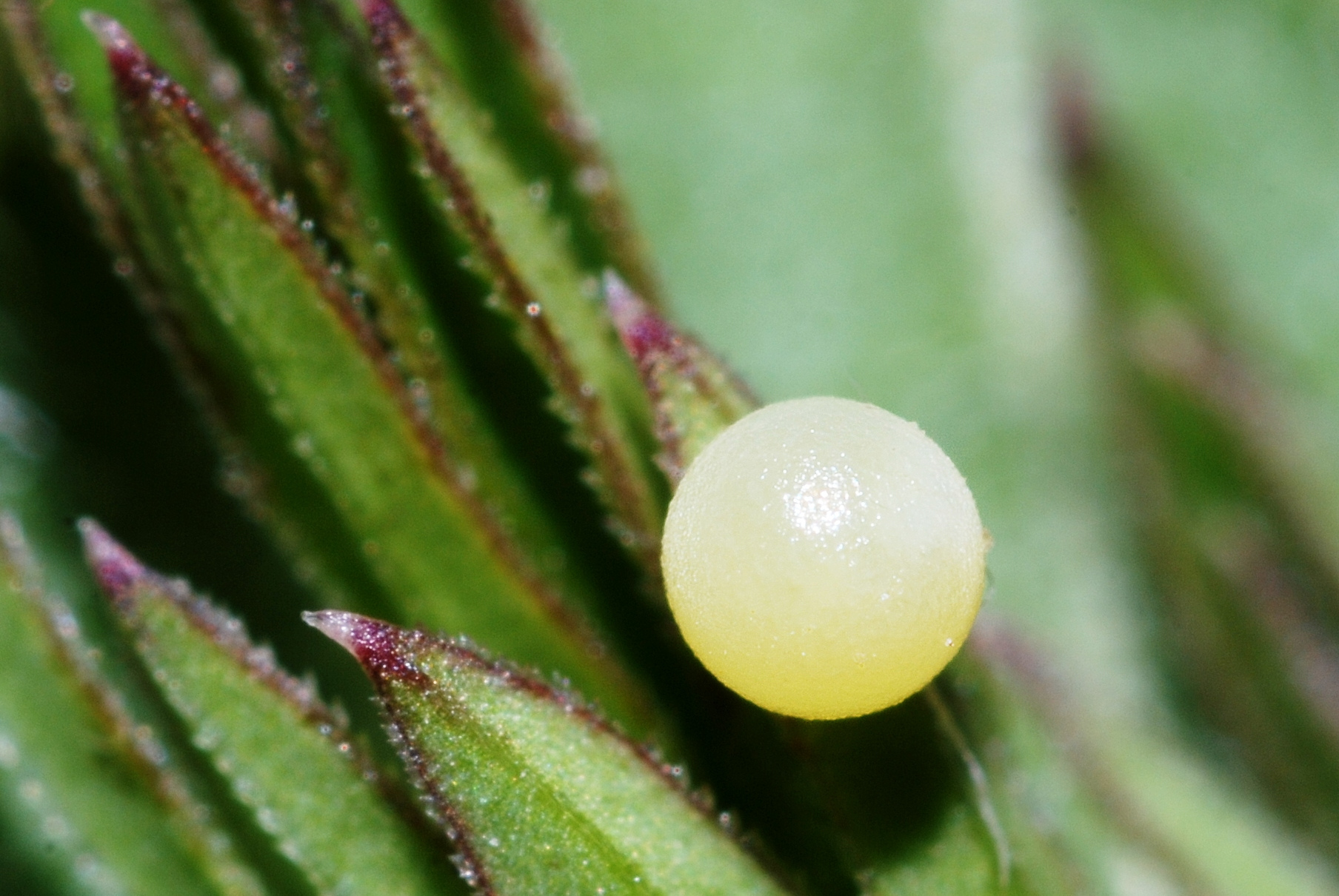
Egg

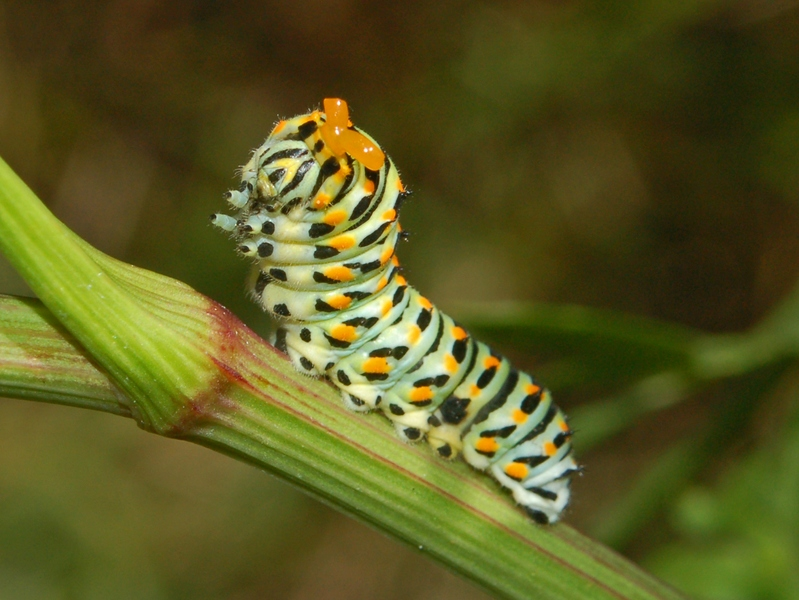
Caterpillar in threatening posture

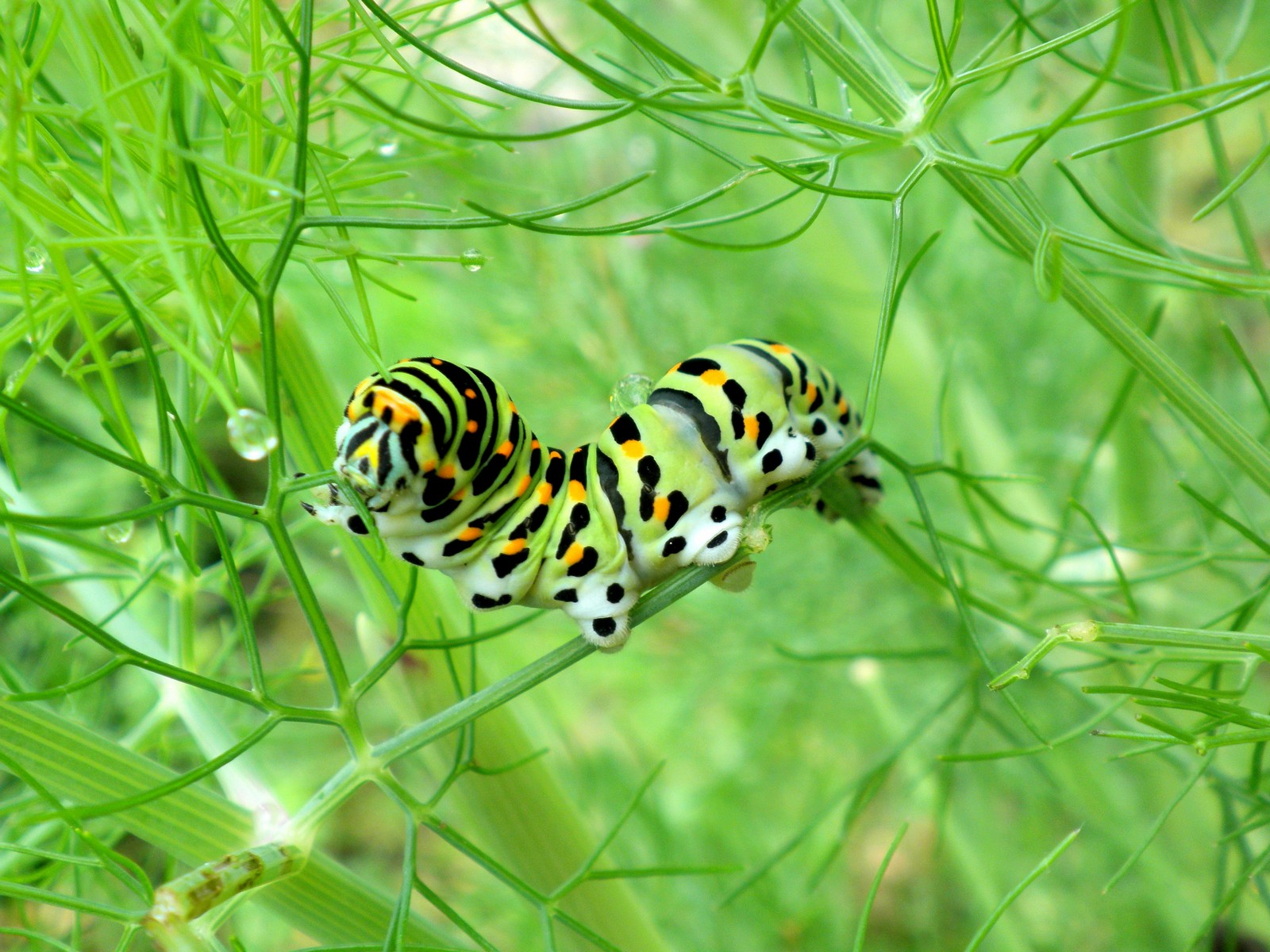
Caterpillar feeding on fennel

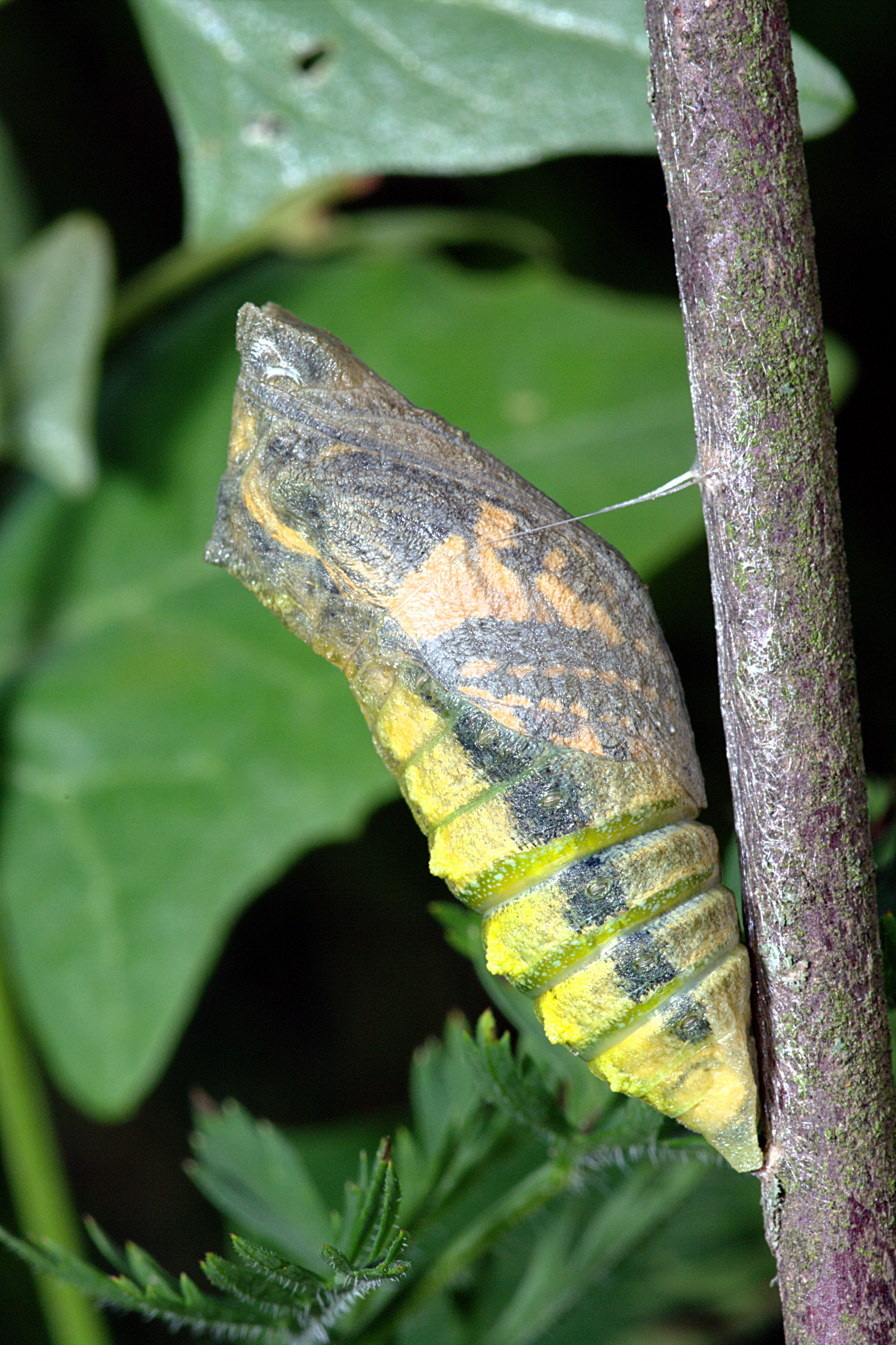
Pupa

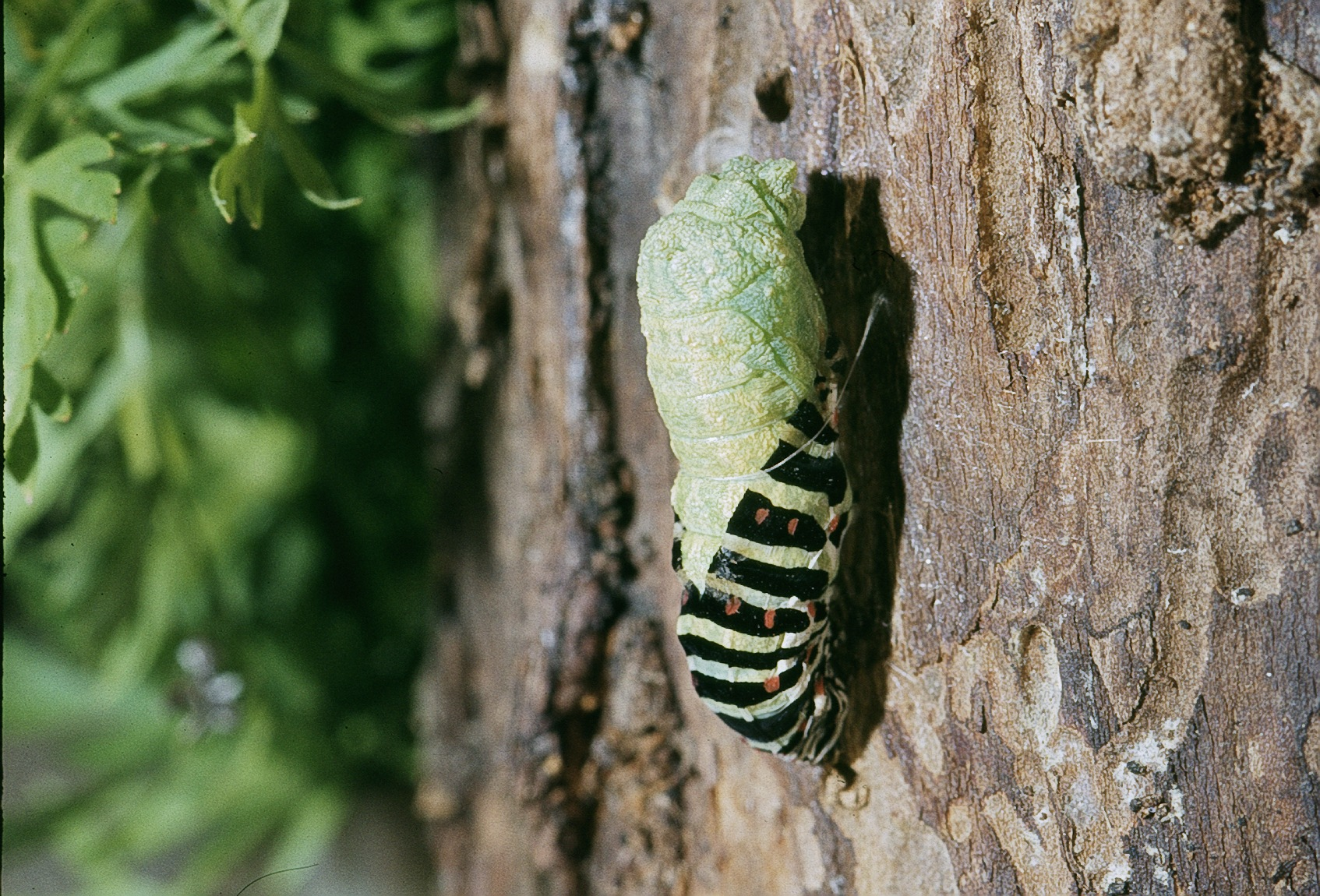
Pupa emerges from skin

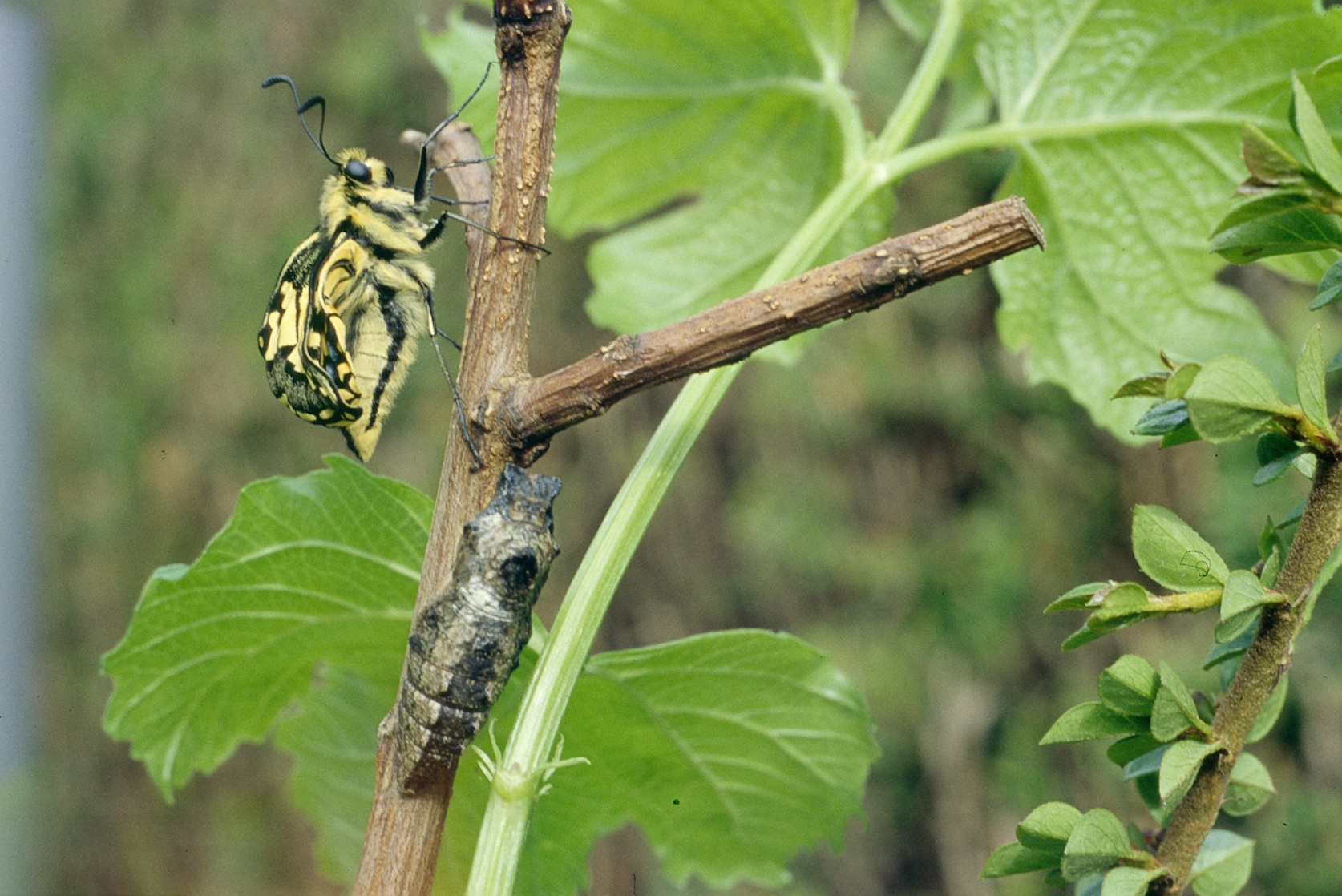
The butterfly emerges spreading its wings

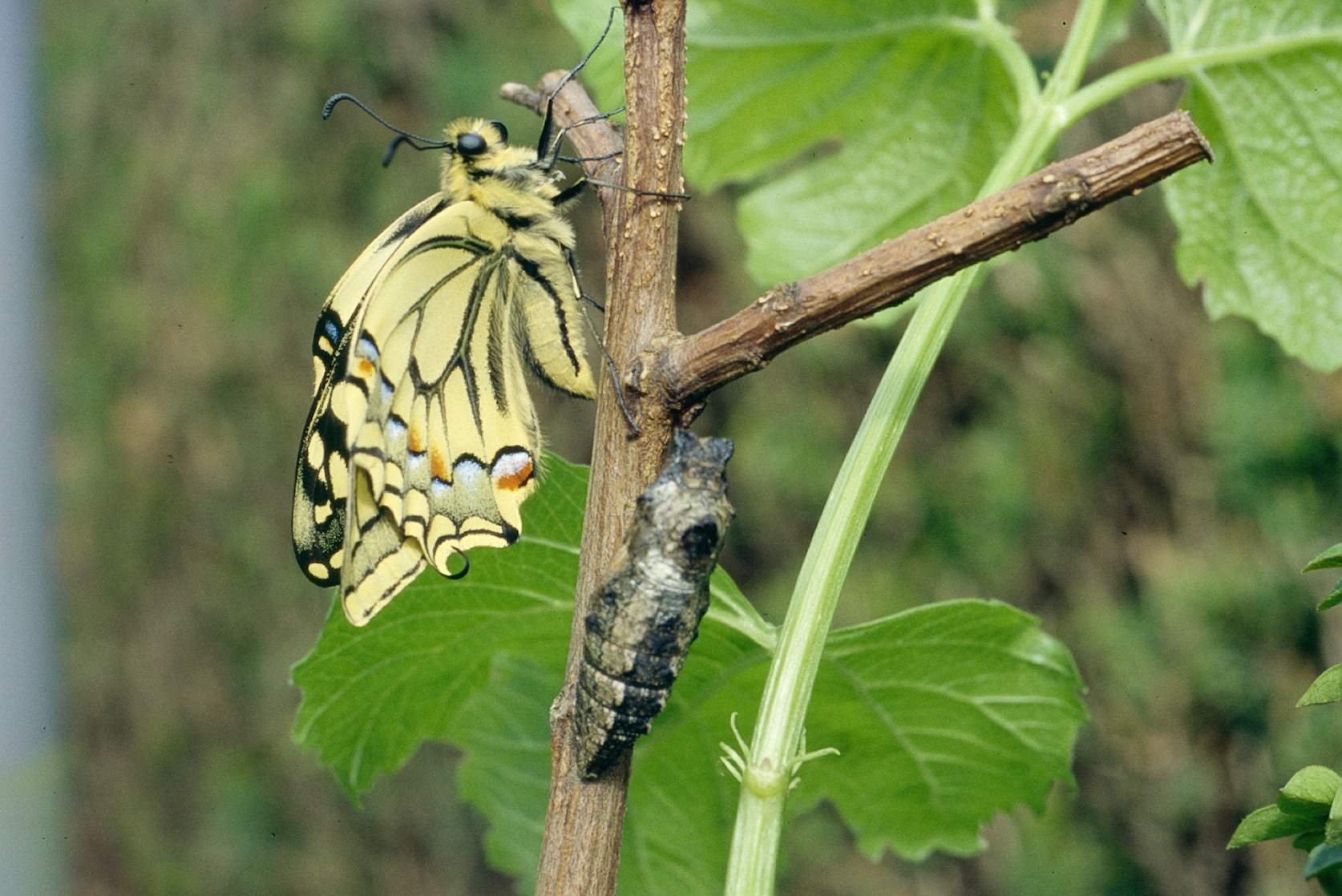
The wings begin to become harder

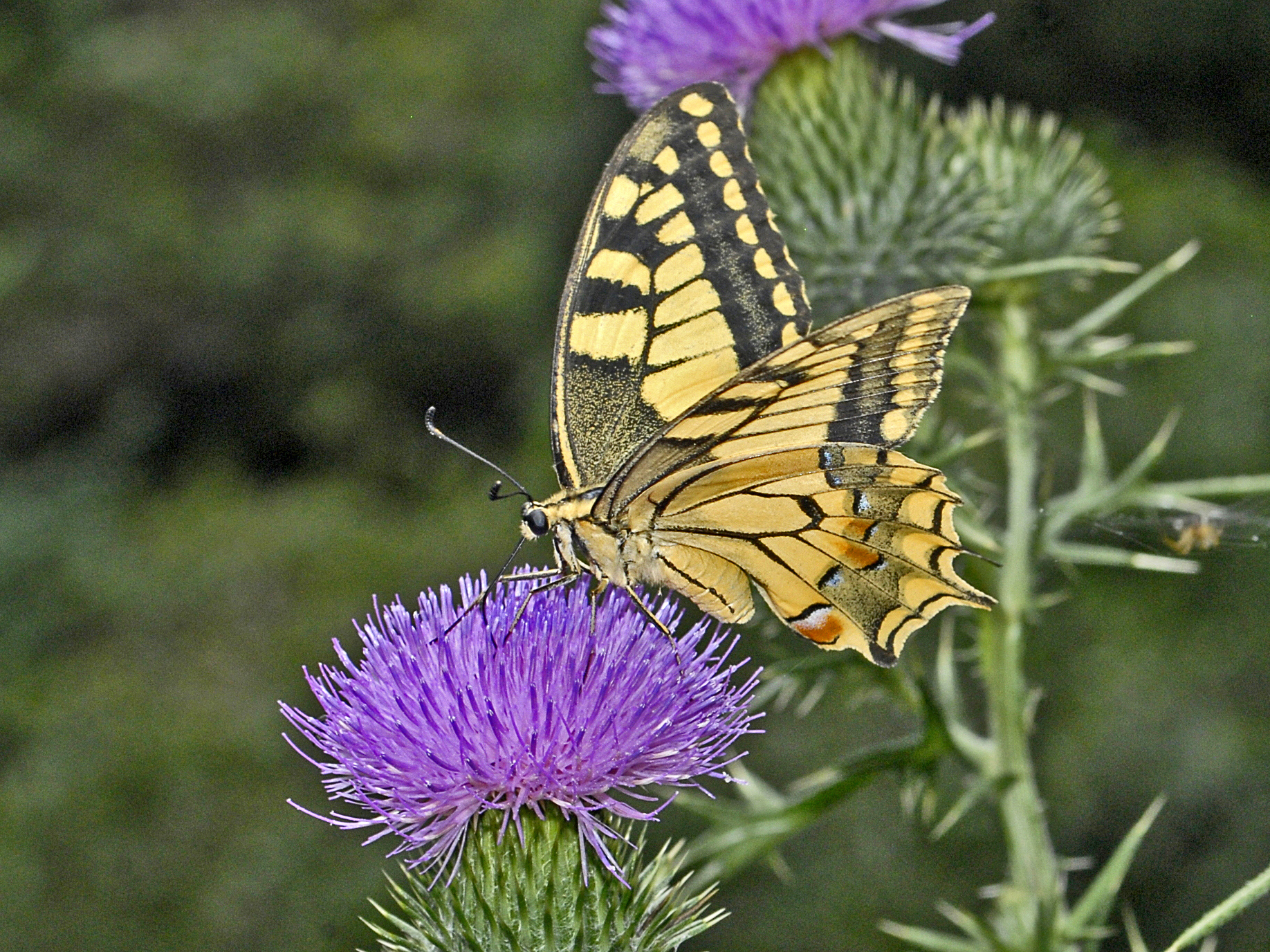
Imago or imaginal stage, in which the insect attains maturity.

== Breeding ==
Old World swallowtails can easily be bred in captivity. Butterflies can be lured to lay eggs in a backyard garden by keeping plenty of caterpillar food plants in it. Common rue plants are highly appropriate for this.

Movie of Papilio machaon caterpillar

Once eggs or young caterpillars have been collected, they can be kept in a pot with holes on its top to allow air circulation. More than one caterpillar may be kept in a single pot since they do not attack each other (although they might sometimes get frightened by other caterpillars moving). They can be fed any of their food plants. Fennel is one of the easiest to find in the wild. Care must be taken with fennel as well as dill, though, because they will not eat hard, woody stems; they need to be fed the tender leaves. They can also be fed rue or milk parsley. Feeding them with unsuitable plants will lead to death from starvation.

Caterpillars are very fast eaters; they will spend their time eating or resting before they resume their eating again. Once a sufficient size has been attained, they will attach themselves to any available structure with their silky threads. They will then stay still until they become pupae. This will take about a day.

Once in the pupa stage, they can be very carefully removed from the pot and placed in a warm location. The time the butterfly takes to form and come out depends on the temperature. If kept in warm summer temperatures, it will take about one or two weeks to form. On the other hand, if the temperature is lower, it might take as long as several months until it feels the weather is warm enough.

Pupae should not be kept on an impermeable surface, since when they eclose a bit of liquid will be released, this means the butterfly would stay wet and might not be able to fly. Absorbing paper such as the one used in kitchens is advisable.

== See also ==
- List of butterflies of India (Papilionidae)
- List of butterflies of Great Britain
