= USS Hoel (DDG-13) =

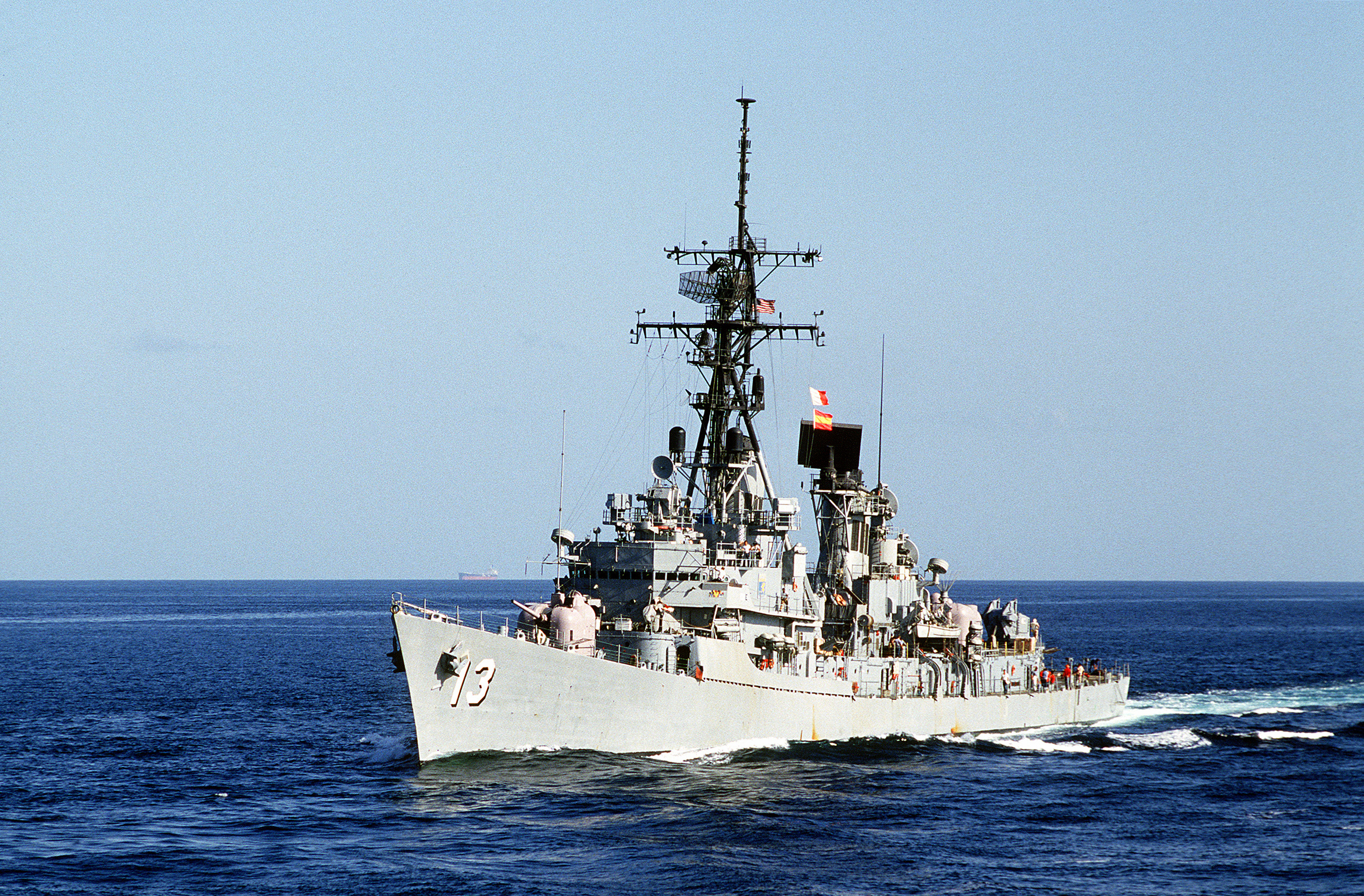
- USS Hoel underway on 1 November 1987

History

United States
- Name: Hoel
- Namesake: William R. Hoel
- Ordered: 17 January 1958
- Builder: Defoe Shipbuilding Company
- Laid down: 3 August 1959
- Launched: 4 August 1960
- Acquired: 5 June 1962
- Commissioned: 16 June 1962
- Decommissioned: 1 October 1990
- Stricken: 20 November 1992
- Identification: Callsign: NNYX; Hull number: DDG-13
- Motto: Prima Inter Optimas; (First among the best)
- Fate: Sold for commercial use, 20 June 1994
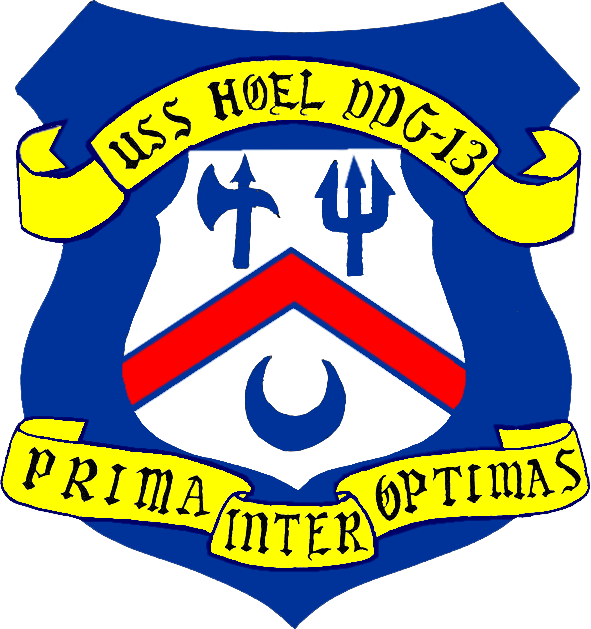
- Badge

General characteristics
- Class & type: Charles F. Adams-class destroyer
- Displacement: 3,277 tons standard, 4,526 full load
- Length: 437 ft (133 m)
- Beam: 47 ft (14 m)
- Draft: 15 ft (4.6 m)
- Propulsion: 2 × General Electric steam turbines providing 70,000 shp (52 MW); 2 shafts; 4 × Babcock & Wilcox 1,275 psi (8,790 kPa) boilers
- Speed: 33 knots (61 km/h; 38 mph)
- Range: 4,500 nautical miles (8,300 km) at 20 knots (37 km/h)
- Complement: 354 (24 officers, 330 enlisted)
- Sensors & processing systems: AN/SPS-39 3D air search radar; AN/SPS-10 surface search radar; AN/SPG-51 missile fire control radar; AN/SPG-53 gunfire control radar; AN/SQS-23 Sonar and the hull mounted SQQ-23 Pair Sonar for DDG-2 through 19; AN/SPS-40 Air Search Radar
- Armament: 1 Mk 11 missile launcher for RIM-24 Tartar SAM system, or later the RIM-66 Standard (SM-1) and Harpoon antiship missile; 2 × 5 in/54 caliber Mark 42 (127 mm) gun; 1 × RUR-5 ASROC Launcher; 6 × 12.8 in (324 mm) torpedo tubes (2 × Mark 32 Surface Vessel Torpedo Tubes)
- Aircraft carried: None

USS Hoel (DDG-13), named for Lieutenant Commander William R. Hoel USN (1824–1879), was a Charles F. Adams-class guided missile destroyer.

Hoel was laid down by Defoe Shipbuilding Company in Bay City, Michigan, on 3 August 1959, launched on 4 August 1960 by Mrs. Harry H. Long, granddaughter of Lieutenant Commander Hoel and commissioned on 16 June 1962, Commander Allen W. Slifer in command.

Hoel served as plane guard for aircraft carriers on Yankee Station in the Tonkin Gulf, participated in Sea Dragon operations, patrolled on Search and rescue duties and carried out Naval Gunfire Support missions during the Vietnam War.

== History ==
=== 1960s ===
After fitting out at Boston, Hoel got underway for her first homeport, San Diego, putting in at Norfolk, Virginia; Mayport and Fort Lauderdale, Florida; Guantanamo Bay; Cartagena, Colombia; Canal Zone; and Acapulco, Mexico, during the voyage. During the passage from Cartagena to the Canal Zone she came upon sailing yacht Stardrift becalmed and adrift en route to Sydney, Australia, from London. Hoel towed the 36-foot (11 m) craft 100 miles (161 km) to safety in Panama.

Hoel arrived in San Diego on 11 September 1962 and spent the ensuing months completing the various inspections, tests, and trials by the Board of Inspection and Survey. When successful firing of ASROC and Tartar missiles completed her qualification and acceptance trials, Hoel joined the ready 1st Fleet.

After a 3-week cruise to Esquimalt, British Columbia, Hoel spent April and May 1963 in Pearl Harbor conducting special exercises. She then returned to waters off San Diego to participate in the Presidential Demonstration held for President John F. Kennedy.

The months of July, August, and part of September were spent at Long Beach Naval Shipyard for the post-shakedown availability assigned each new ship approximately 1 year after commissioning. At this time improved fire-control radars were installed and tested by successful missile firings. Hoel departed Long Beach on 17 October 1963 for duty in the Western Pacific to serve as the flagship of Commander Destroyer Division 12.

In ensuing years she alternated deployments in the Far East with operations off the West Coast. Her 1966 deployment to the Western Pacific began when she departed San Diego 28 July. On September she was on search and rescue patrol off Da Nang, Vietnam. On 8 December the guided missile destroyer became naval gunfire support ship in the Corps I area. She fired 2,100 rounds destroying at least 20 enemy structures and two trench networks; damaging 61 buildings, three bunkers, eight trench networks, and five roads; and killing 24 Viet Cong while wounding seven. Hoel retired to Hong Kong 21 December but headed for Yankee Station the day after Christmas to screen the aircraft carrier Coral Sea. On this patrol she helped to rescue a pilot after his A-4 Skyhawk had crashed.

On 19 October 1987, Hoel was one of 4 ships participating in Operation Nimble Archer, destroying 2 militarized oil platforms in the Persian Gulf. Twenty minutes before the surface action group opened fire, USS Thach radioed the platforms, telling the crews to abandon them. At 2 pm, four U.S. destroyers opened fire: USS Hoel, USS Leftwich, USS Kidd, and USS John Young. One platform was boarded by U.S. special forces, who recovered teletype messages and other documents, then planted explosives to destroy the platform. Air cover was provided by the cruisers USS Long Beach and USS William H. Standley, two F-14 Tomcat fighters and an E-2 Hawkeye from USS Ranger. The high-explosive shells did negligible blast damage to the steel-lattice platforms, but eventually set them ablaze. Hoel fired nearly 400 rounds during this operation.

=== Decommissioning ===
Hoel was decommissioned on 1 October 1990, stricken from the Naval Vessel Register on 20 November 1992 and sold on 20 June 1994.

Hoel was one of seven decommissioned US naval vessels purchased by Charleston Shipbuilders Inc. (CSI) in 1994. The corporation planned to use the ships' power plants to generate electricity which they would then sell commercially. In theory, each ship would be able to generate approximately fifty megawatts of electricity, enough to supply approximately 150,000 households.

=== Power Barge ===
The city of Manaus, Brazil had rapidly expanded since it was declared a tax-free zone by the Brazilian government in 1967. Eletronorte, the local power utility service, had been unable to keep up with the increasing demand and Manaus experienced frequent blackouts. In 1997, CSI negotiated a thirty million dollar contract to supply power to Manaus.

The ex-Hoel was chosen as the ship to be used. However, the plans of both companies were too optimistic. Eletronorte announced that ex-Hoel would be delivering power within only a few days of its arrival in Manaus. CSI had failed to test the ship's equipment fully before departing for Brazil and failed to appreciate how many repairs the ship's 38-year-old power plant might require. The ship ended up needing weeks of work after its arrival in Brazil before it could begin generating power and numerous repairs after that. Repairs were much more difficult to accomplish in Brazil because the parts and technicians now had to be brought in from CSI's headquarters back in the United States. Meanwhile, many people in Manaus had become angry over the failed power delivery and there were violent protests. The ex-Hoel was never able to generate more than a quarter of the electricity that had been promised and that only periodically. After a year of failed attempts, Eletronorte cancelled its contract with CSI.

Research on this can be found here... https://sites.google.com/site/usshoelddg13site/home/hoel-history/post-decomm
