= Holl =

Holl and Höll are surnames that may refer to:

- Adolf Holl (1930–2020), Austrian Roman Catholic writer and theologian
- Barbara Höll, (born 1957), German politician
- Diane Holl (born 1964), British motor racing engineer
- Edwin Holl (1916–2005), American politician
- Elias Holl (1573–1646), German architect
- Francis Holl (1815–1884), English engraver, son of William Holl the Elder
- Frank Holl (1845–1888), English painter
- Gussy Holl (1888–1966), German actress and singer
- Hartmut Höll (born 1952), German pianist and music professor
- Harvey Buchanan Holl (1820–1886), British surgeon and naturalist
- John Holl (1802–1869), Prince Edward Island politician
- Justin Holl (born 1992), American hockey player
- Karl Holl (1866–1926), German professor of theology and church history
- Nicolas Josef Eugene Holl (1855–c. 1919), French entomologist
- Robert Holl (born 1947), Dutch opera singer
- Steven Holl (born 1947), American architect
- Ursula Holl (born 1982), German football player and coach
- Valentina Höll (born 2001), Austrian mountainbiker
- Werner Holl (born 1970), German pole vaulter
- William Holl the Elder (1771–1838), English engraver
- William Holl the Younger (1807–1871), English engraver, son of Willi

== Fictional ==
- the title character of Dr. Holl, a 1951 West German film

== See also ==
- Hall (disambiguation),
