= USS Hoel (DD-768) =

History

United States
- Name: USS Hoel
- Namesake: William R. Hoel
- Builder: Bethlehem Shipbuilding Corporation, San Francisco, California
- Laid down: 21 April 1944
- Stricken: 13 September 1946
- Fate: Construction contract cancelled 13 September 1946; Scrapped incomplete on building ways

General characteristics
- Class & type: Gearing-class destroyer
- Displacement: 2,425 long tons (2,464 t) (standard); 3,460 long tons (3,520 t) (full)
- Length: 390 ft 6 in (119.0 m) (overall)
- Beam: 40 ft 10 in (12.45 m)
- Draft: 14 ft 4 in (4.37 m)
- Propulsion: 2 × geared turbines; 2 × propellers
- Speed: 35 kn (65 km/h; 40 mph)
- Range: 4,500 nmi (8,300 km; 5,200 mi) at 20 kn (37 km/h; 23 mph)
- Complement: 336 officers and enlisted
- Armament: 6 × 5 in (127 mm)/38 caliber guns; 12 × 40 mm (1.6 in) Bofors AA guns; 11 × 20 mm (0.79 in) Oerlikon AA cannons; 10 × 21 in (533 mm) torpedo tubes; 6 × depth charge projectors; 2 × depth charge tracks

USS Hoel (DD-768) was a planned United States Navy Gearing-class destroyer laid down during World War II but never completed. The ship was to be named after William R. Hoel (1824–1879), a United States Navy officer Navy Cross recipient.

Hoel was laid down by the Bethlehem Shipbuilding Corporation at San Francisco, California on 21 April 1944. The end of World War II in August 1945 resulted in the termination of the contract for her construction on 13 September 1946. She was stricken from the Naval Vessel Register that day and scrapped on the building ways.
