= Pearl Hoel =

Pearl Hoel (November 10, 1905–February 7, 2005) was co-founder of the Sturgis Motorcycle Rally, along with her husband J.C. Hoel. She was inducted to the Motorcycle Hall of Fame in 1991, and the South Dakota Hall of Fame in 2005.

She served as Meade County Clerk of Courts, Register of Deeds, and County Auditor.
