= Hol, Ludhiana =

Hol
- village
- Location in Punjab, India Hol (India)
- Coordinates: 30°37′20″N 76°06′45″E
- Country: India
- State: Punjab
- District: Ludhiana

Population (2011)
  - Total: 1,475

Languages
  - Official: Punjabi
- Time zone: UTC+5:30 (IST)
- PIN: 141414
- Telephone code: 01628
- Vehicle registration: PB 26
- Nearest city: Khanna

Hol is a village located near Khanna in Ludhiana district of the Indian state of Punjab. Youth in this village is surprisingly talented and excel in academics. Udvir Singh scored the highest in the whole district and pursued his studies in Northern College, Canada.
