= Hol Church =

Hol Church may refer to the following churches in Norway:

- Hol Church and Old Holl Church, in Hol, Norway, in Buskkerud county
- Hol Church (Nordland), in Vestvågøy Municipality, Nordland county, Norway
