= HO-1 =

HO-1 may refer to:

- HO-1 or HMOX1 (Heme oxygenase 1), a human gene
- Hiller VZ-1 Pawnee, early military designation HO-1, a 1953 direct-lift rotor aircraft
- Ho-1 cannon, a Japanese World War II weapon
- Cherry Grove, HO-1, a site on the National Register of Historic Places in Maryland
- (8037) 1993 HO1, a near-Earth asteroid

== See also ==
- OH-1, Ohio's 1st congressional district
- Kawasaki OH-1, a helicopter
