= Harvey Buchanan Holl =

British botanist (1820–1886)

Harvey Buchanan Holl (28 September 1820 – 11 September 1886, Worcestershire) was a British medical doctor, surgeon, geologist, paleontologist, lichenologist, and bryologist.

== Biography ==
His father was William Holl, Esq., who edited The Analyst (Simpkin & Marshall, 1834–1840), a monthly journal of literature and natural history, with a focus on England's midland counties. Harvey Buchanan Holl's brother was William Haworth Holl (1824–1908), who was appointed in 1884 a circuit judge.

After education at the King's School, Worcester, Harvey Buchanan Holl, when he was about seventeen years old, entered the Medical College in Birmingham. He soon became acquainted with Sir Henry de la Beche, who invited him as a companion to geologise in Devon and Cornwall. This expedition, which extended over about six months, led Holl to abandon his medical studies. Henry de la Beche recommended Holl to Henry Darwin Rogers at the University of Pennsylvania. As an assistant to Rogers, Holl participated in the 2nd Pennsylvania Geological Survey, working on the geological survey for about three years. For an additional year in the United States, he used his own financial resources to geologise. Upon returning to England, Holl became a medical student at St George's Hospital and successfully qualified on 3 December 1849 as a Member of the Royal College of Surgeons of England. Upon the start in October 1853 of the Crimean War, he was appointed as one of the senior civil surgeons to aid the British Army's medical staff. He served partly in Crimea but mostly in Turkey at the Scutari Hospital (made famous by Florence Nightingale). Holl remained abroad until the conclusion of the Crimean War in 1856. Upon his return to England, he practised medicine for some years at St George's Square in Pimlico, Central London. In 1859 he graduated with the research degree M.D. from King's College, Aberdeen.

His two most important papers might be On the Geological Structure of the Malvern Hills and adjacent Districts (1865) and On the Older Rocks of South Devon and East Cornwall (1868). He was elected a Fellow of the Geological Society of London in 1862, at approximately the time that he gave up his medical practice and moved to Tower Lodge, The Link, Malvern, where he devoted himself to geological studies.

Holl donated 295 lichen specimens in 1868 and bequeathed his herbarium of lichens and mosses to the British Museum.

== Selected publications ==
- Holl, Harvey B. (1863). "On the Correlation of the several Subdivisions of the Inferior Oolite in the Middle and South of England". Quarterly Journal of the Geological Society. 19 (1–2): 306–317. doi:10.1144/GSL.JGS.1863.019.01-02.32. S2CID 129121054.
- Holl, Harvey B. (1864). "On the Geological Structure of the Malvern Hills and adjacent District". Quarterly Journal of the Geological Society. 20 (1–2): 413. doi:10.1144/GSL.JGS.1864.020.01-02.50. S2CID 219216759. (abstract for 1865 paper)
- Holl, Harvey B. (1865). "On the Geological Structure of the Malvern Hills and adjacent Districts". Quarterly Journal of the Geological Society. 21 (1–2): 72–102. doi:10.1144/GSL.JGS.1865.021.01-02.15. S2CID 197536608.
- Jones, T. Rupert; Holl, H.B. (1865). "XLVII.—Notes on the Palæozoic Bivalved Entomostraca. No. VI. Some Silurian species (Primitia)". Annals and Magazine of Natural History. 16 (96): 414–425. doi:10.1080/00222936508679460.
- Holl, Harvey B. (1866). "Goniophyllum Pyramidale, HIS". Geological Magazine. 3 (27): 430–431. doi:10.1017/S0016756800167779. S2CID 128905059.
- Holl, Harvey B. (1868). "On the Older Rocks of South Devon and East Cornwall". Quarterly Journal of the Geological Society. 24 (1–2): 400–454. doi:10.1144/GSL.JGS.1868.024.01-02.45. S2CID 140598210.
- Jones, T. Rupert; Holl, H.B. (1868). "VII.—Notes on the Palæozoic Bivalved Entomostraca. No. VIII. Some Lower-Silurian species from the Chair of Kildare, Ireland". Annals and Magazine of Natural History. 2 (7): 54–62. doi:10.1080/00222936808695746.
- Jones, T. Rupert; Holl, H.B. (1869). "XXX.—Notes on the Palæozoic Bivalved Entomostraca. No. IX. Some Silurian species". Annals and Magazine of Natural History. 3 (15): 211–229. doi:10.1080/00222936908695920.
- Holl, Harvey B. (1872). "IV.—Notes on Fossil Sponges". Geological Magazine. 9 (97): 309–315. doi:10.1017/S0016756800465179. S2CID 248533700.
- Holl, Harvey B. (1872). "III.—Notes on Fossil Sponges". Geological Magazine. 9 (98): 343–352. doi:10.1017/S0016756800465301. S2CID 224576734.
- Jones, T. Rupert; Holl, H.B. (1886). "XXX.—Notes on the Palœozoic Bivalved Entomostraca.—No. XX. On the genus Beyrichia and some new species" (PDF). Annals and Magazine of Natural History. 17 (100): 337–363. doi:10.1080/00222938609460153.
- Jones, T. Rupert; Holl, H.B. (1886). "XXXVI.—Notes on the Palœozoic Bivalved Entomostraca.—No. XXI. On some Silurian genera and species". Annals and Magazine of Natural History. 17 (101): 403–414. doi:10.1080/00222938609460165.
