= Hol Station =

Railway station in Hol, Norway

Hol
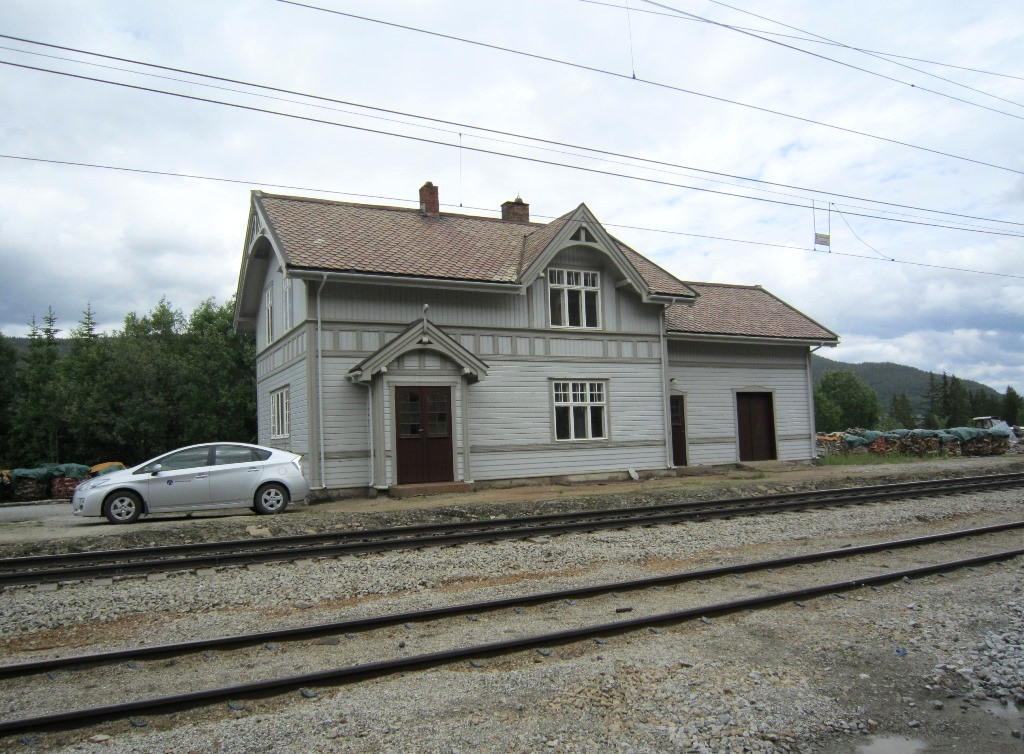
- Hol Station (2013)

General information
- Location: 3576 Hol, Buskerud; Norway
- Coordinates: 60°34′34″N 8°22′1″E
- Operator: Norges Statsbaner
- Line: Bergen Line
- Distance: 287.38 kilometres (178.57 mi)
- Platforms: 1
- Tracks: 2

Construction
- Architect: Harald Kaas

History
- Opened: 21 December 1907
- Closed: 1983
Location
- Location within Norway

Hol Station (Norwegian: Hol stasjon) is a disused railway station located on the Bergen Line in Hol municipality, Buskerud county, Norway. It was opened as a Passing loop with a stop in 1907 when the Bergen Railway was opened to Gulsvik Station. It was upgraded to a station in 1931. However, in 1983 the station was closed and all passengers trains do not stop anymore. Meanwhile, the station still provides the passing loop function.
