= Dag Hol =

Norwegian figurative painter (born 1951)

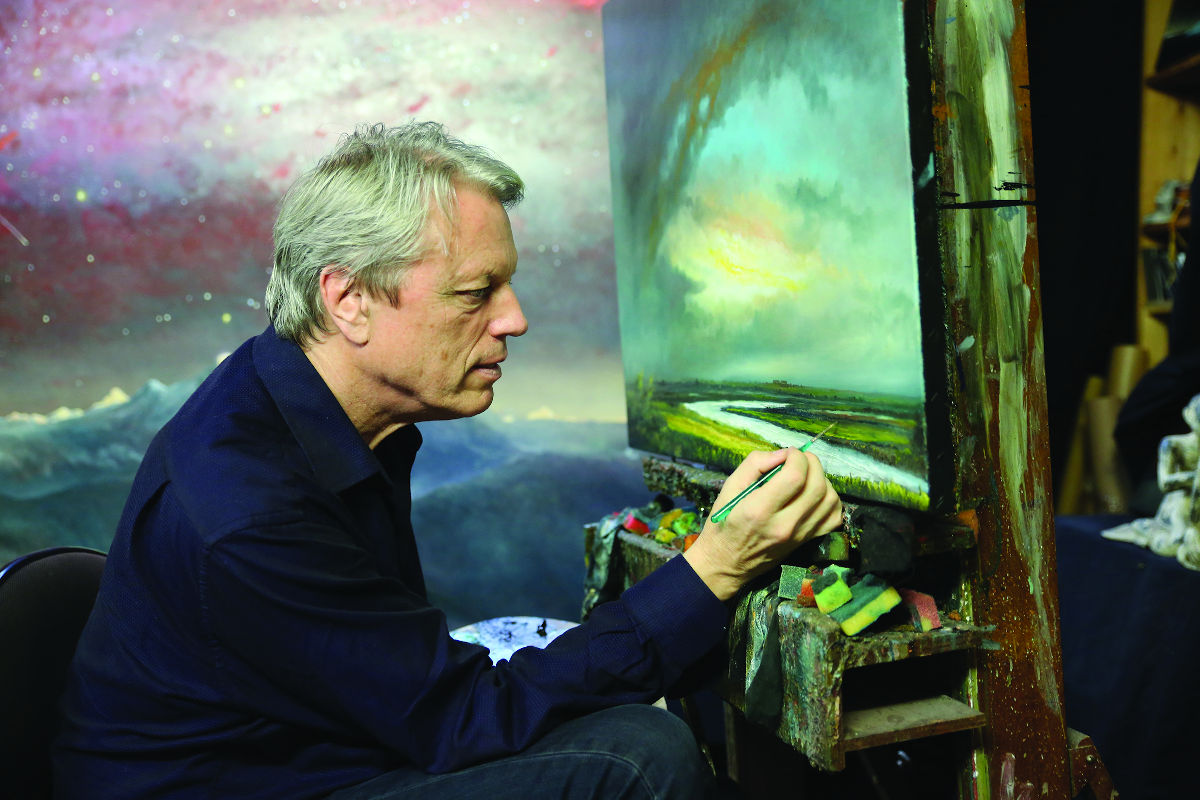
- Hol painting in his workshop, Oslo, Norway
- Born: 21 October 1951 (age 74); Hamburg, Germany
- Known for: Painting

Dag Hol (born 26 October 1951, in Hamburg) is a Norwegian figurative painter and graphic artist.

== Biography ==
He was educated at the Norwegian National Academy of Fine Arts (1980-1984) and has been a student of Gunnar Dietrichson and Odd Nerdrum. Earlier he studied Nordic, French, German and Sanskrit language and literature at the University of Oslo. Since he was 18–19 years old he has practised yoga and Acem-meditation regularly and this has influenced his artistic and philosophical point of view. He made his debut as an artist with his solo exhibition in 1983 in Oslo.

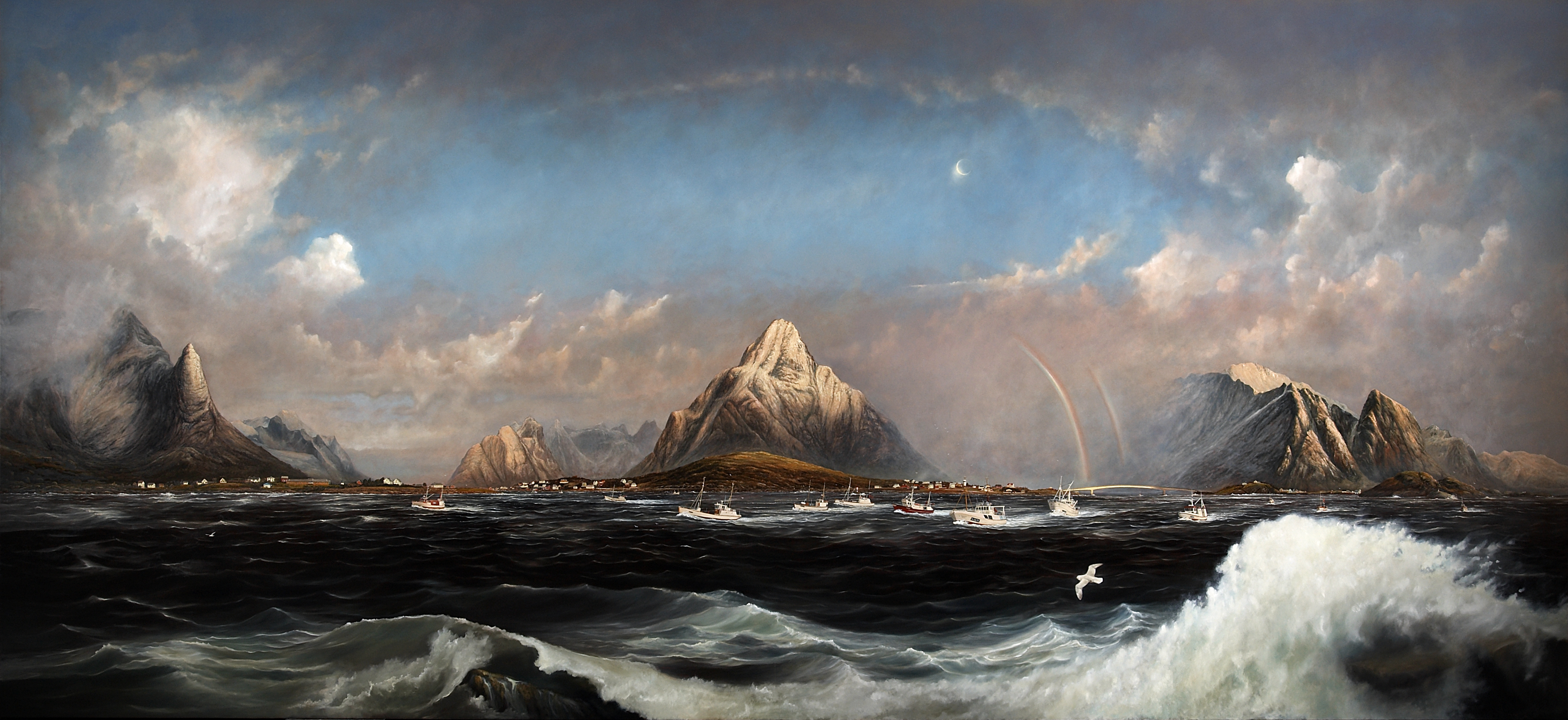
"Reine in Lofoten", 212x460cm, 2006

His work is influenced by the old masters, from Renaissance art to Romanticism.

He has studied Indian, Chinese and Japanese classical art and philosophy as well. He has given several speeches on the philosophy of art in Norway, USA, India, China and Taiwan, some with the title "The Art of Doing". His main philosophy is the focusing on craftmanship as a signature and essence of what art is all about. It is through the attitude and the way art is created that the spiritual energy and power in the artistic expression are decided. He is opposed to the modern view of art that the concept and the ideas in art are the most important and central; his view is that the concept and the ideas emerge from the way the art is done.

At Dag Hol's solo exhibition in the City Hall of Oslo in March 2012 and 2016 more than 3,000 people attended the opening and more than 22,000 people came to the show during the three weeks the exhibition was open (according to the security department at the City Hall), which made the exhibition one of the best visited solo exhibitions ever in Norwegian art history.
