= J.C. Hoel =

American motorcycle racer

J.C. (Clarence) "Pappy" Hoel (May 30, 1904 – February 1, 1989) was an American motorcycle racer, dealer, businessman, and founder of the Sturgis Motorcycle Rally. In 1983, he received the American Motorcyclist Association's (AMA) Dud Perkins Award for outstanding contributions to motorcycling. Both J.C. "Pappy" Hoel and his wife Pearl were inducted to the Motorcycle Hall of Fame in 1998.

The Pappy Hoel campground in South Dakota attracts thousands of visitors yearly for the Sturgis rally. The campground opened in 2016 on the site of a campground operating under another name.
