= Nicolas Josef Eugene Holl =

French entomologist

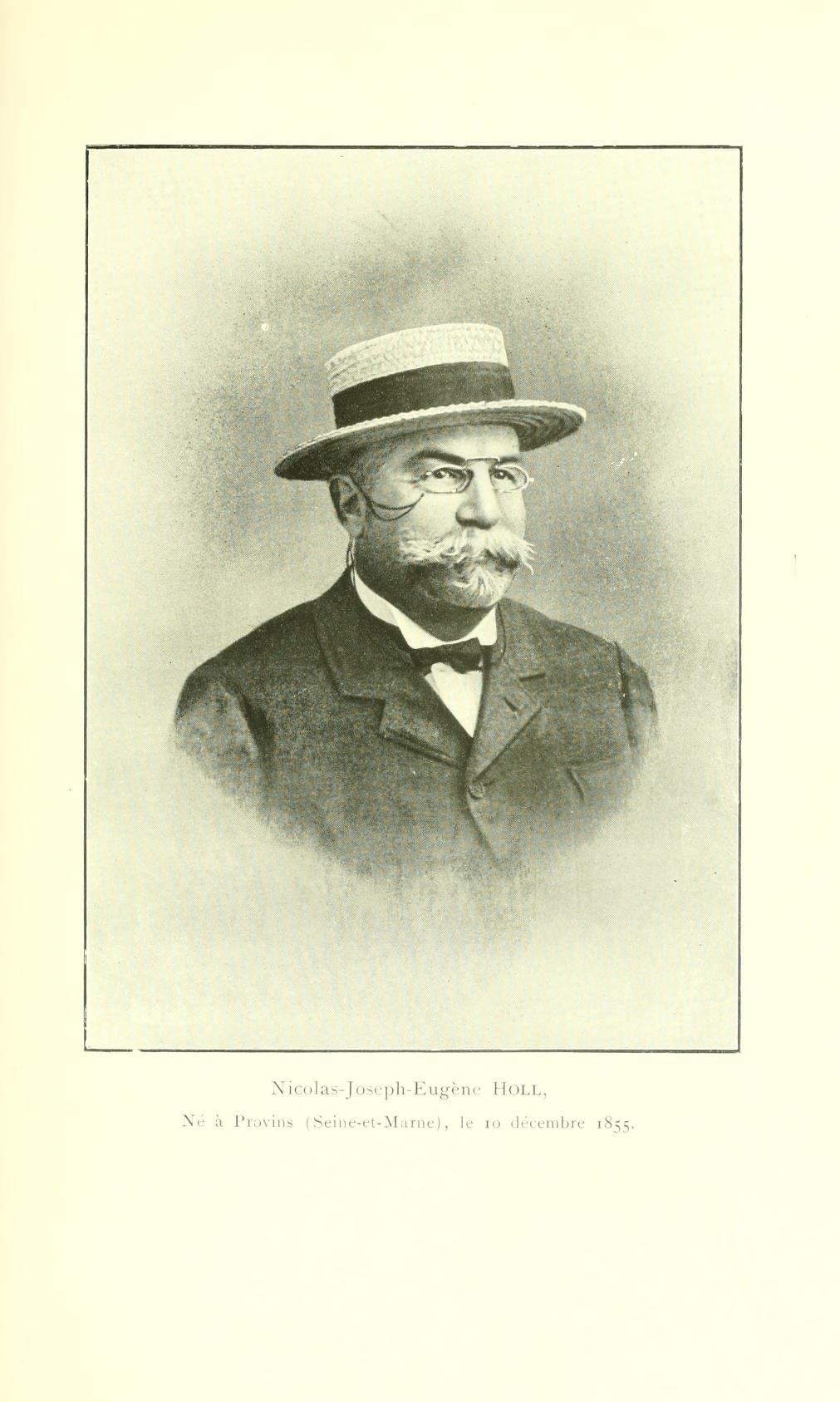
Nicolas Josef Eugene Holl

Nicolas Josef Eugene Holl (10 December 1855 in Provins – c. 1919) was a French entomologist who specialised in Lepidoptera.

Nicolas Holl was a military engineer. Holl collected extensively in Algiers and Blida. His collections were sold to Walter Rothschild. He was a Member of the Société entomologique de France.

== Works ==
partial list

- Holl, 1909 Sur deux variétés de coloration du Thestor Ballus F. [Lep. Lycaenidae] Bull. Soc. ent. Fr. 1909 : 228-229
- Holl, 1910 Description d'une variété nouvelle de Thais rumina L. [Lep. Papilionidae] Bull. Soc. ent. Fr. 1910 : 164
