= William R. Hoel =

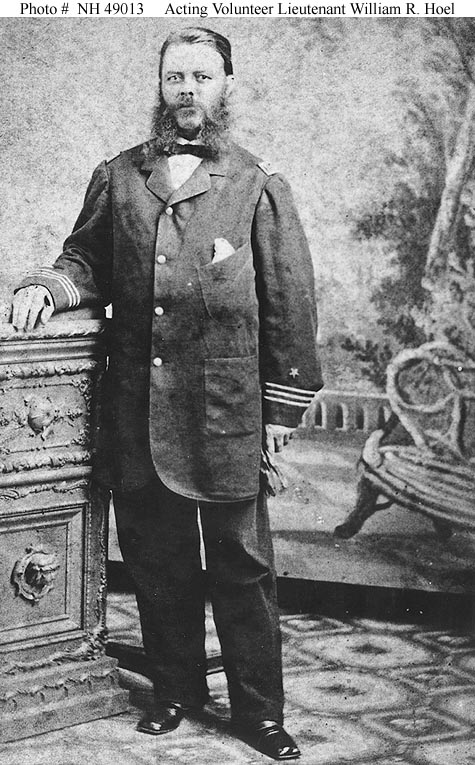
- Hoel as acting volunteer lieutenant of the U.S. Navy
- Born: 7 March 1824; Butler County, Ohio, US
- Died: 23 May 1879 (aged 55); Waynesville, Ohio, US
- Occupations: Steamboat captain Farmer
- Spouses: Mary Riley; Elizabeth Hunt
- Children: 2

William R. Hoel (7 March 1824 – 23 May 1879) was an American naval officer during the American Civil War. A native of Butler County, Ohio, he was a Mississippi River steamboat pilot when he entered the United States Navy 19 October 1861.

== Family life ==
Hoel's first wife was Mary Riley, daughter of Daniel Riley, of Cincinnati. His second wife was Elizabeth Hunt, eldest daughter of Dr. Samuel Pancoast Hunt and his wife Elizabeth Thomas, of Morrow, Warren County, Ohio. Captain Hoel and Elizabeth Hoel had two children: Sarah Elizabeth Hoel and Rion Hoel.

== Opening the Mississippi ==
On 6 February 1862, while serving as the First Master of Cincinnati, Hoel was wounded during the Battle of Fort Henry. Less than two months later, on 4 April, he volunteered to pilot gunboat Carondelet in her famous run past the Rebel batteries at Island Number 10 to reach Maj. Gen. John Pope's Army at New Madrid. The gunboat's valiant dash through a hailstorm of Confederate fire enabled Union forces to cross the river and to take this key island with quantities of cannon, equipment and stores. It thus opened the Mississippi for operations by Union gunboats bringing the Federal armies in a long stride to within sight of Memphis.

Hoel's courageous and skillful service on this occasion won the praise of Flag-Officer Andrew H. Foote, the thanks of the Navy from Secretary Gideon Welles, and promotion to the rank of Acting Volunteer Lieutenant effective 29 April 1862.

On 10 May 1862 Hoel assumed command of Cincinnati when serious wounds incapacitated her captain, Commander Roger N. Stembel. The new commander of the Western Flotilla, Captain Charles Henry Davis, took this opportunity to express his admiration of Hoel. "I can not praise more than they deserve his high valor and ability. He sets the highest example to those below him, and if it were possible to give him a permanent position worthy of his merits, the Navy would be the gainer ..."

== The Vicksburg campaign ==
On 29 October, Hoel then took command of USS Pittsburg on which he served with distinction in the campaign to take Vicksburg. One of Lieutenant Hoel's exploits during this campaign is of special interest since it foreshadowed the heroism of the World War II destroyer which bore his name, USS Hoel.

On 29 April 1863, as Acting Rear Admiral David D. Porter's flotilla was bombarding the Confederate Batteries at Grand Gulf, his flagship, USS Benton, became unmanageable and was caught under heavy fire in a position where she could neither steer nor reply to the enemy guns. On seeing Porter's predicament, Hoel slipped the Pittsburg in between Benton and the flaming Rebel batteries to protect her by taking the fire himself. In the next 10 minutes his heroism cost the Pittsburg 6 men killed and 8 wounded, but the sacrifice allowed Benton to extricate herself from the deadly trap.

The bombardment was so successful that the next day General Ulysses Grant safely moved his troops across the Mississippi to begin the operations which at long last isolated and captured Vicksburg.

Hoel was promoted to Acting Volunteer Lieutenant Commander on 10 November 1864.

== In command of USS Vindicator ==
Detached from Pittsburg, he then took command of USS Vindicator 1 March 1865 on which he served until 7 July 1865. He was honorably discharged on 30 December 1865.

== Postwar ==
Hoel returned to piloting, was active in the Grand Army of the Republic, and eventually served as master of the lighthouse tender Lily.

In 1867, Hoel traveled on the Quaker City ship to Europe and the Holy Land along with other tourists, including Mark Twain, which Twain wrote about in his book The Innocents Abroad.

== Death ==
He married a second time but became suspicious of his wife Elizabeth's relationship with a local doctor. He confronted them with a pistol in May 1879 but was shot and killed in the struggle. After an inquest, the doctor was not charged with any crime.
