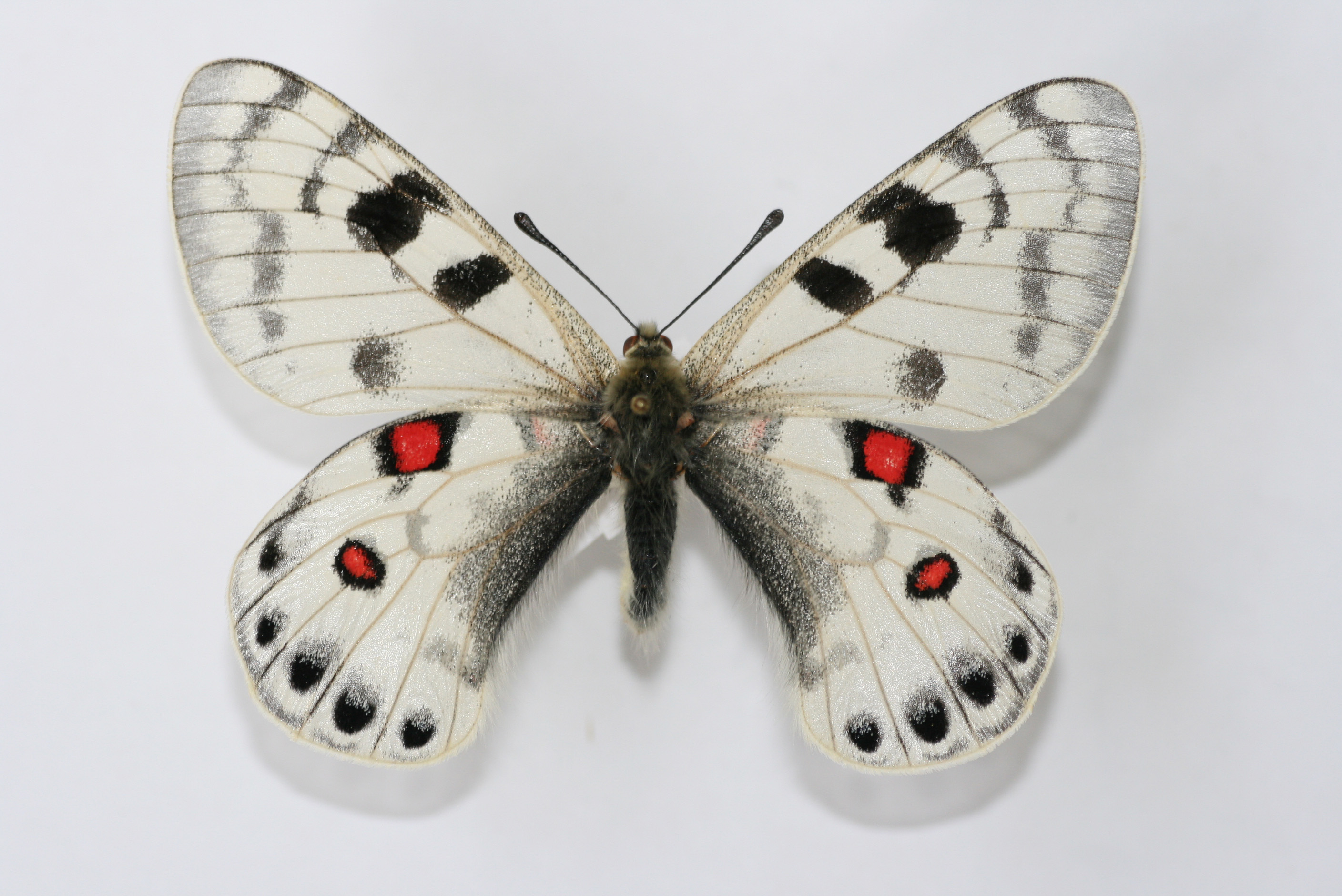
- From the Felix Stumpe collection

Scientific classification
- Kingdom: Animalia
- Phylum: Arthropoda
- Class: Insecta
- Order: Lepidoptera
- Family: Papilionidae
- Genus: Parnassius
- Species: P. davydovi

Binomial name
- Parnassius davydovi Churkin, 2006

= Parnassius davydovi =

Species of butterfly

Parnassius davydovi is a high-altitude butterfly which is found in Kyrgyzstan (Tian Shan). It is a member of the snow Apollo genus (Parnassius) of the swallowtail family (Papilionidae).

Parnassius davydovi is a newly discovered Parnassius species closely related to P. autocrator and P. loxias
