= Parnassius labeyriei =

Scientific classification
- Domain: Eukaryota
- Kingdom: Animalia
- Phylum: Arthropoda
- Class: Insecta
- Order: Lepidoptera
- Family: Papilionidae
- Genus: Parnassius
- Species: P. labeyriei

Binomial name
- Parnassius labeyriei (Weiss & Michel, 1989)

Species of butterfly

Parnassius labeyriei is a high-altitude butterfly which is found in China. It is a member of the snow Apollo genus Parnassius of the swallowtail family, Papilionidae.

The taxonomic status of this butterfly is uncertain. It was described as a separate species and this view was maintained by Chou (1994) and Weiss (1992). Later authors believe it to be conspecific with Parnassius maharaja.
