= Parnassius hide =

Scientific classification
- Kingdom: Animalia
- Phylum: Arthropoda
- Class: Insecta
- Order: Lepidoptera
- Family: Papilionidae
- Genus: Parnassius
- Species: P. hide

Binomial name
- Parnassius hide Koiwaya, 1987

Species of butterfly

Parnassius hide is a high-altitude butterfly which is found in China. It is a member of the snow Apollo genus (Parnassius) of the swallowtail family, Papilionidae. The species was first described by Satoshi Koiwaya in 1987.

== Distribution ==
It is a rare and local species confined to a few areas in western China and Tibet. P. hide was not described until 1987 when it was discovered in the Kunlun Mountains of Qinghai, China.

== Classification ==
This butterfly is closely related to P. patricius subspecies priamus. Five subspecies are described.

- P. h. meveli Weiss & Michel
- P. h. aksobhya Shinkai
- P. h. gamdensis Nose
- P. h. hengduanshanus Nose
- P. h. poshurarinus Nose
