= Parnassius nandadevinensis =

Scientific classification
- Domain: Eukaryota
- Kingdom: Animalia
- Phylum: Arthropoda
- Class: Insecta
- Order: Lepidoptera
- Family: Papilionidae
- Genus: Parnassius
- Species: P. nandadevinensis

Binomial name
- Parnassius nandadevinensis Weiss, 1990

Synonyms
- Parnassius nadadevinensis

Species of butterfly

Parnassius nandadevinensis is a high-altitude butterfly which is found only on Mt Nanda Devi, India. It is a member of the snow Apollo genus (Parnassius) of the swallowtail family (Papilionidae). It was described on the basis of a single worn specimen. The genitalia are said to be intermediate in structure between P. acdestis and P. stoliczkanus and could possibly represent an aberrant specimen of either.
