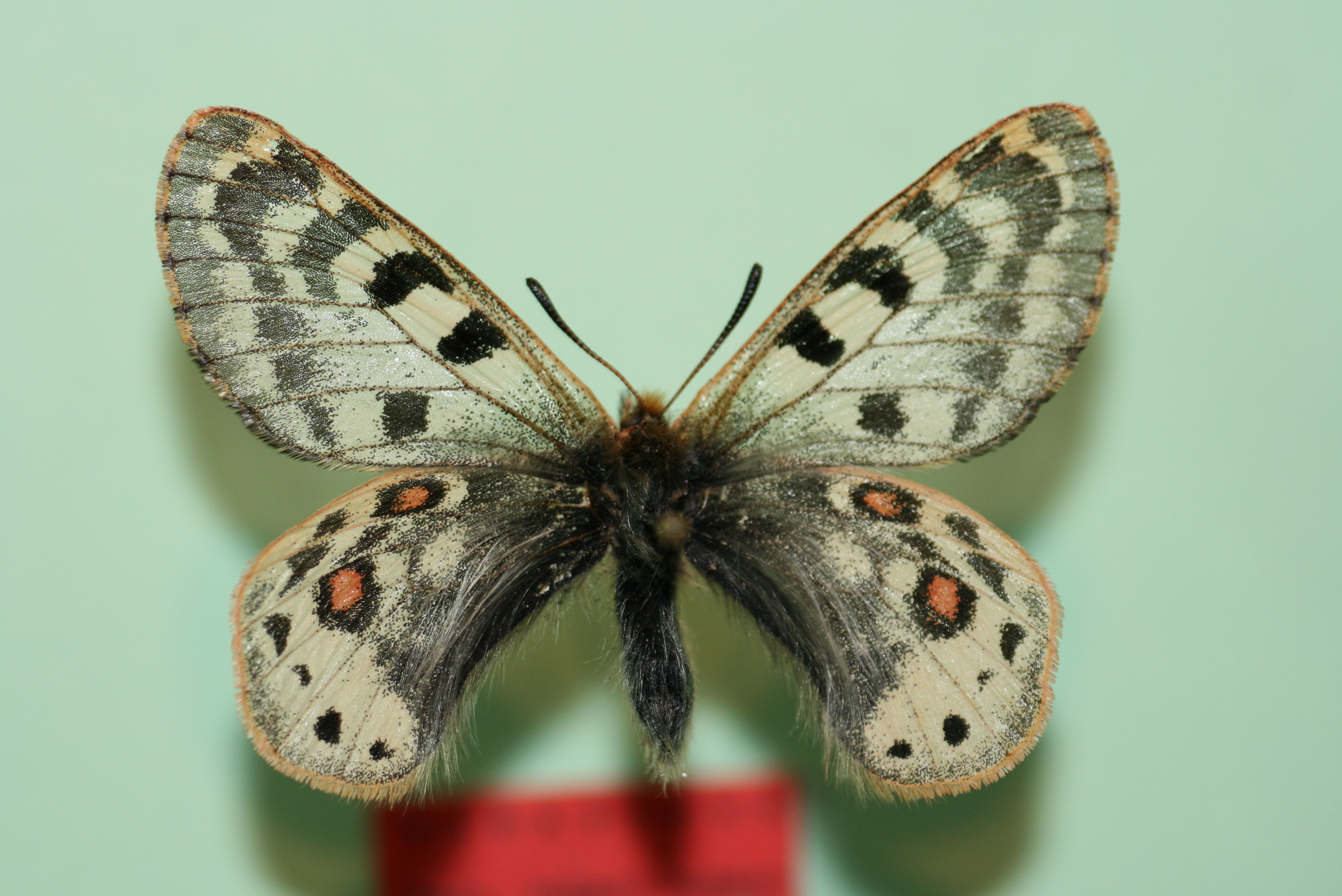
- Male paratype - Felix Stumpe collection

Scientific classification
- Kingdom: Animalia
- Phylum: Arthropoda
- Clade: Pancrustacea
- Class: Insecta
- Order: Lepidoptera
- Family: Papilionidae
- Genus: Parnassius
- Species: P. huberi

Binomial name
- Parnassius huberi Paulus, 1999

= Parnassius huberi =

Species of butterfly

Parnassius huberi is a high-altitude butterfly which is found in Tibet. It is a member of the snow Apollo genus (Parnassius) of the swallowtail family (Papilionidae).

P. huberi is a newly discovered Parnassius species closely related to P. acco and P. schultei.
