= Parnassius nosei =

Scientific classification
- Domain: Eukaryota
- Kingdom: Animalia
- Phylum: Arthropoda
- Class: Insecta
- Order: Lepidoptera
- Family: Papilionidae
- Genus: Parnassius
- Species: P. nosei

Binomial name
- Parnassius nosei (Watanabe, 1989)

Species of butterfly

Parnassius nosei is a high-altitude butterfly found in China. It is a member of the snow Apollo genus Parnassius of the swallowtail family, Papilionidae. The taxonomic status of this butterfly is uncertain. Some authors regard nosei as a subspecies of Parnassius maharaja.
