= Parnassius baileyi =

Bailey's Apollo

Scientific classification
- Domain: Eukaryota
- Kingdom: Animalia
- Phylum: Arthropoda
- Class: Insecta
- Order: Lepidoptera
- Family: Papilionidae
- Genus: Parnassius
- Species: P. baileyi

Binomial name
- Parnassius baileyi South, 1913

Species of butterfly

Parnassius baileyi, or Bailey's Apollo, is a high-altitude butterfly which is found in southwestern China (Sichuan, northern Yunnan and eastern Tibet). It is a member of the snow Apollo genus (Parnassius) of the swallowtail family (Papilionidae).

The taxonomic status of this butterfly is uncertain. P. baileyi was originally described as a subspecies of P. acco, later as a subspecies of P. rothschildianus Bryk, 1931 and also P. przewalskii (Alphérakyi 1887), and now also treated as a separate species (Weiss 1992), (Chou, 1994). Molecular studies suggest it is the sister species of P. acco.

The butterfly was named for Frederick Marshman Bailey who collected the first specimens.

== Subspecies ==
- Parnassius baileyi baileyi
- Parnassius baileyi bubo Bryk, 1938
- Parnassius baileyi rothschildianus Bryk, 1931
