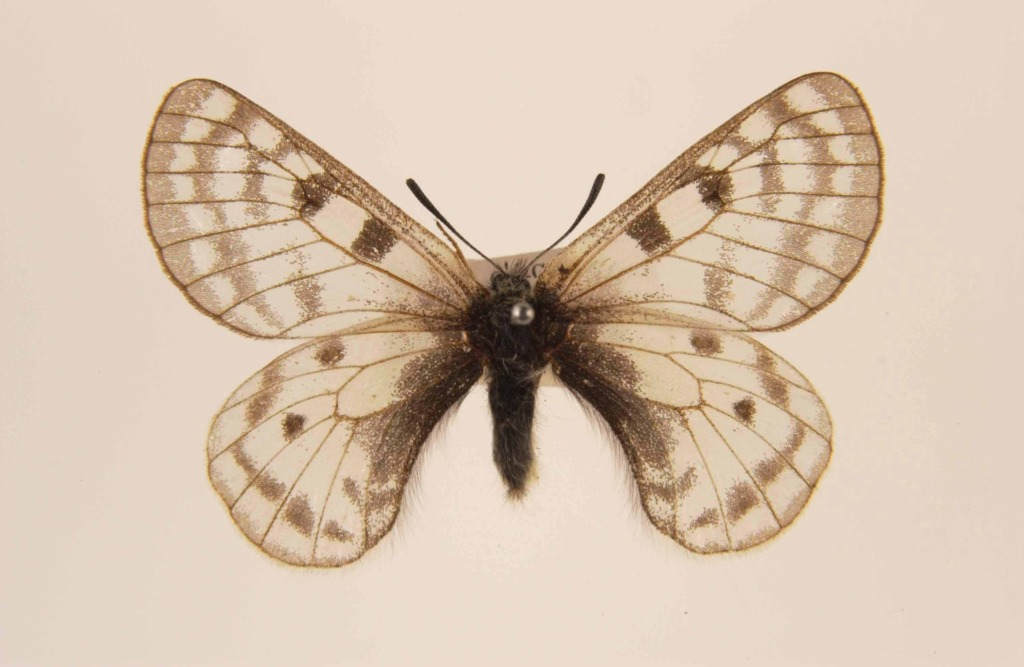

Scientific classification
- Domain: Eukaryota
- Kingdom: Animalia
- Phylum: Arthropoda
- Class: Insecta
- Order: Lepidoptera
- Family: Papilionidae
- Genus: Parnassius
- Species: P. simonius

Binomial name
- Parnassius simonius Staudinger, 1889

= Parnassius simonius =

Species of butterfly

Parnassius simonius is a high-altitude butterfly which is found only in the Pamir Mountains of Central Asia. The type locality is Aram-Kunghei, Zaalaisky Mountains, Kyrgyzstan. It is a member of the snow Apollo genus (Parnassius) of the swallowtail family, Papilionidae.

P. simonius is found on slopes at 3,400-4,500 m flying in July. The larva is associated with Lagotis decumbens and Veronica luetkeana.

== Identification ==
P. simo differs from P. simonius by the upper hindwing having its submarginal band represented by a discontinuous row of arrow-like teeth and from P. boedromius, by the upper hindwing submarginal band being smoothly dentate (tooth like).

=== Subspecies ===
- Parnassius simonius simonius
- Parnassius simonius grayi Avinoff, 1916
- Parnassius simonius nigrificatus Kreuzberg, 1986
- Parnassius simonius taldicus Gundorov, 1991
