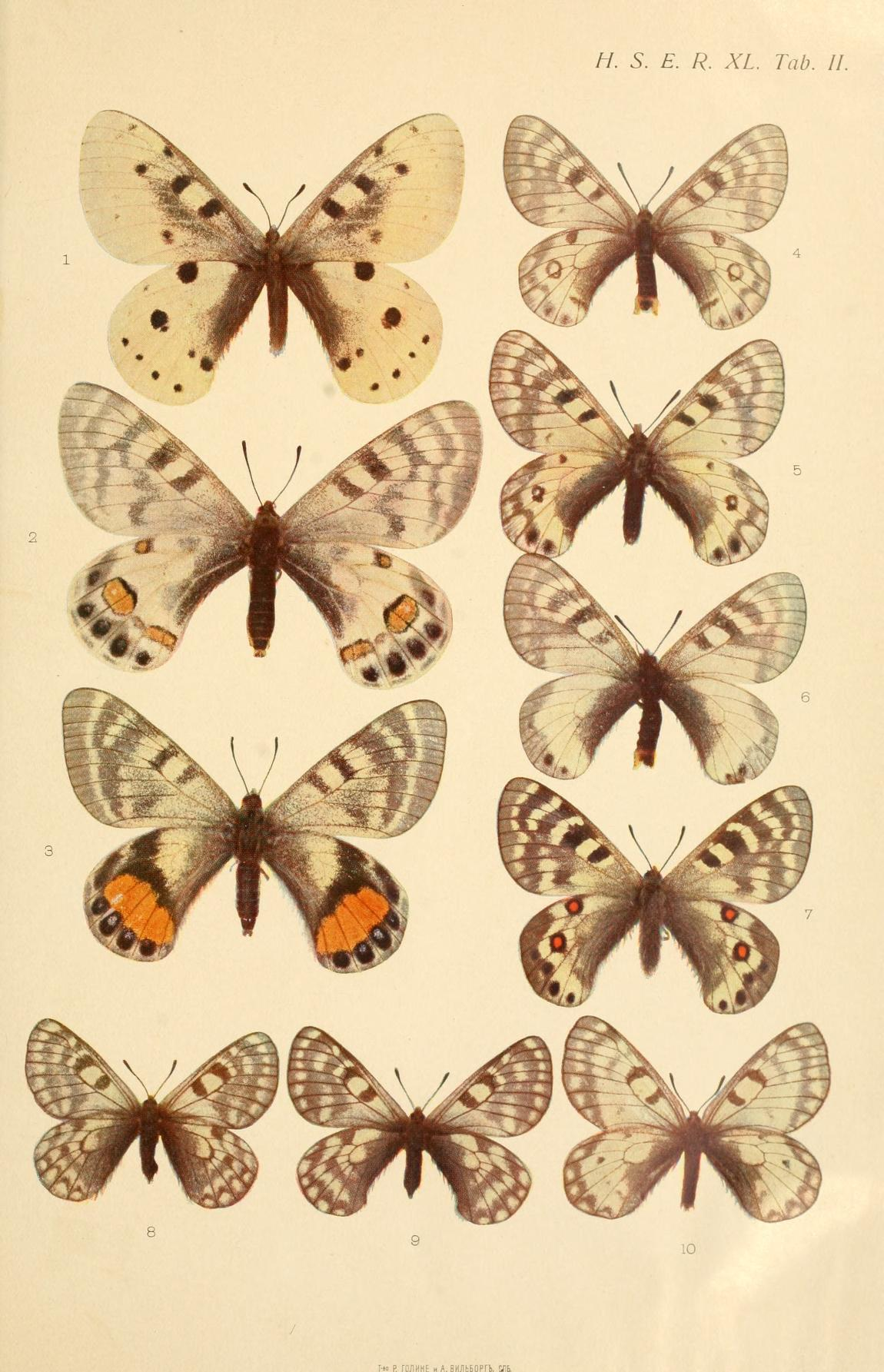
- Plate accompanying original description Parnassius jakobsoni, figures 4 female, 5 male

Scientific classification
- Domain: Eukaryota
- Kingdom: Animalia
- Phylum: Arthropoda
- Class: Insecta
- Order: Lepidoptera
- Family: Papilionidae
- Genus: Parnassius
- Species: P. jacobsoni

Binomial name
- Parnassius jacobsoni (Avinoff, 1913)

Synonyms
- Parnassius staudingeri jacobsoni Avinoff, 1913

= Parnassius jacobsoni =

Species of butterfly

Parnassius jacobsoni is a high-altitude butterfly which is found only in Tajikistan and Afghanistan. It is a member of the snow Apollo genus (Parnassius) of the swallowtail family (Papilionidae).
