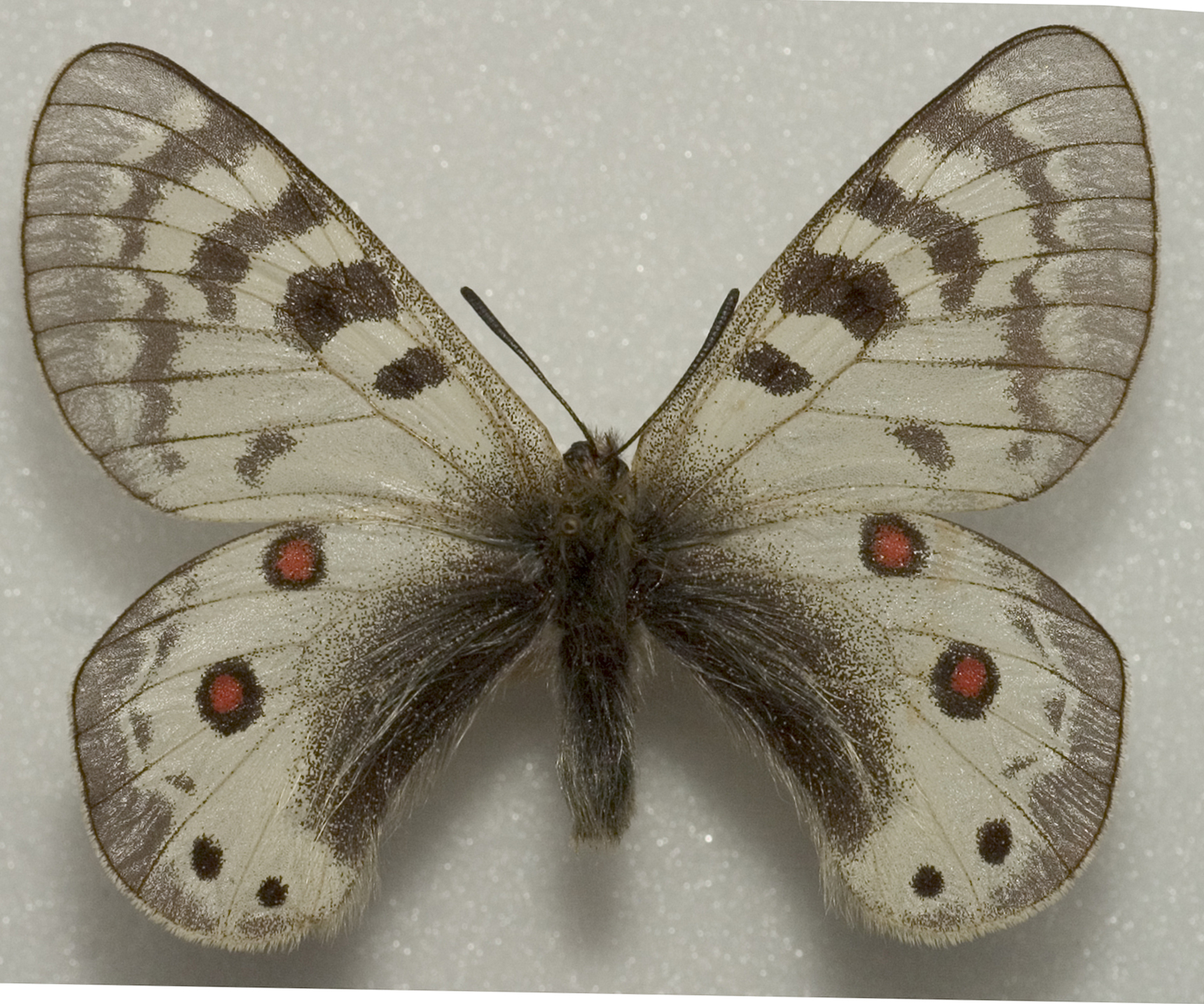
- Museum specimen from Trans Alai Aram Kungei

Scientific classification
- Kingdom: Animalia
- Phylum: Arthropoda
- Clade: Pancrustacea
- Class: Insecta
- Order: Lepidoptera
- Family: Papilionidae
- Genus: Parnassius
- Species: P. cardinal

Binomial name
- Parnassius cardinal Grum-Grshimailo, 1887

= Parnassius cardinal =

Cardinal Apollo

Species of butterfly

Parnassius cardinal, the cardinal Apollo, is a high-altitude butterfly which is found in north Afghanistan and Tajikistan. It is a member of the snow Apollo genus (Parnassius) of the swallowtail family (Papilionidae). The species was first described by Grigory Grum-Grshimailo in 1887.

P. cardinal which was described as a species was for many years thought to be a subspecies of Parnassius delphius but it is a distinct species.

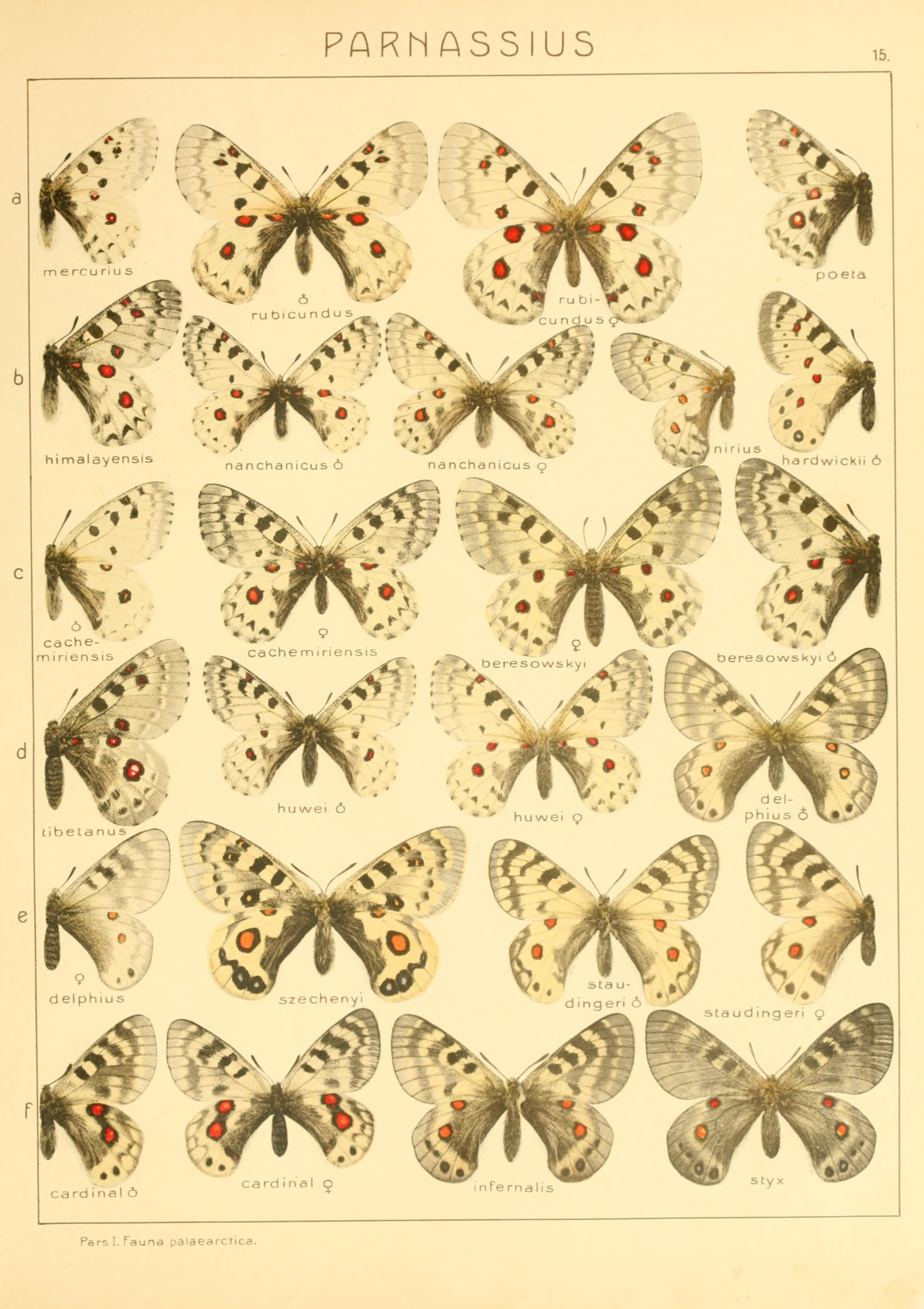
Parnassius cardinal and related species

== Description ==
Note: The wing pattern in Parnassius species is inconsistent and the very many subspecies and forms make identification problematic and uncertain. Structural characters derived from the genitalia, wing venation, sphragis and foretibial epiphysis are more, but not entirely reliable. The description given here is a guide only. For an identification key see Ackery P.R. (1975).

A magnificent form [of delphius], profusely marked with black, the deep red ocelli of hindwing enlarged, their black borders connected by a broad bar; the females usually darker, with more extended pattern. On hindwing below large red basal spots and a red-centred hindmarginal spot.
