= Parnassius inopinatus =

Scientific classification
- Kingdom: Animalia
- Phylum: Arthropoda
- Class: Insecta
- Order: Lepidoptera
- Family: Papilionidae
- Genus: Parnassius
- Species: P. inopinatus

Binomial name
- Parnassius inopinatus (Kotzsch, 1940)

Species of butterfly

Parnassius inopinatus is a high-altitude butterfly which is found only in Afghanistan and parts of north-western Pakistan. It is a member of the snow Apollo genus (Parnassius) of the swallowtail family, (Papilionidae).
