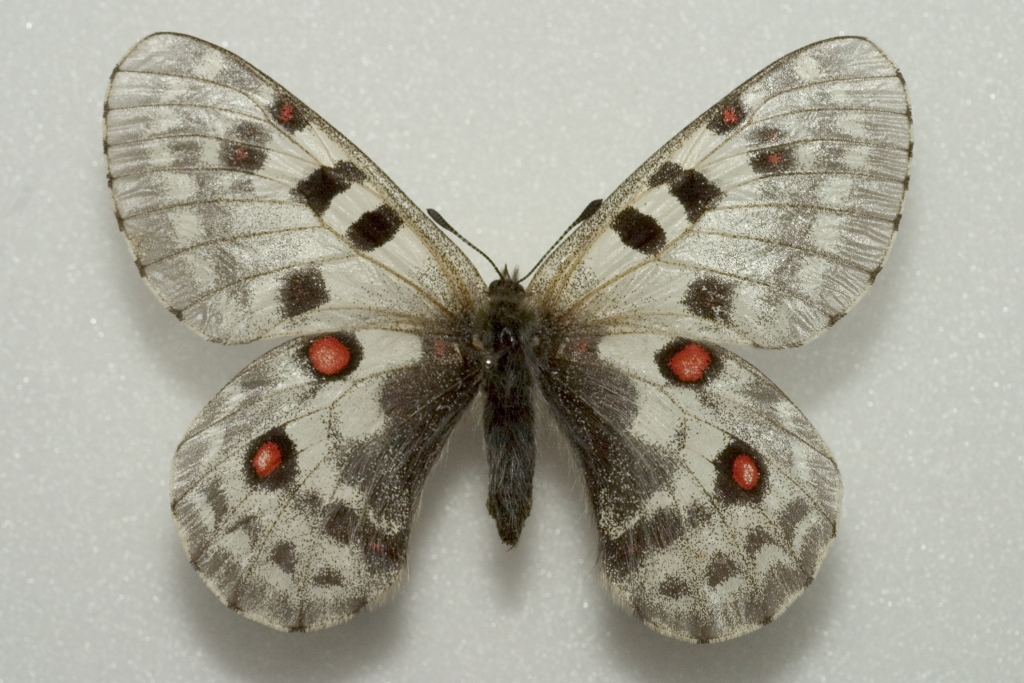
- Syntype of P. actius actinobolus (female) from Bogdo Ula in collection of Ulster Museum

Scientific classification
- Kingdom: Animalia
- Phylum: Arthropoda
- Clade: Pancrustacea
- Class: Insecta
- Order: Lepidoptera
- Family: Papilionidae
- Genus: Parnassius
- Species: P. actius

Binomial name
- Parnassius actius Eversmann, 1843

= Parnassius actius =

Species of butterfly

Parnassius actius, also known as the scarce red apollo, is a high-altitude butterfly found in Central Asia and South Asia. It is a member of the snow Apollo genus (Parnassius) of the swallowtail family (Papilionidae).

== Range ==
Found in Turkmenistan, Uzbekistan, Tajikistan, Kyrgyzstan, north-eastern Afghanistan, the Indus Valley of India and Pakistan, and Xinjiang region of China.

== Description ==
Note: The wing pattern in Parnassius species is inconsistent and the very many subspecies and forms make identification problematic and uncertain. Structural characters derived from the genitalia, wing venation, sphragis and foretibial epiphysis are more, but not entirely reliable. The description given here is a guide only. For an identification key see P.R. Ackery (1975).

P. actius can be recognized by the more elongate and a little more pointed forewing. Ground colour usually pure white, more rarely slightly yellowish; vitreous margin of forewing narrow, as a rule not reaching the posterior angle, or the edge itself posteriorly narrowly white: submarginal spots feebly developed; in male usually only the anterior costal spot centred with red, in female both spots. The male, besides, somewhat duller, hindmarginal spot of forewing sometimes also marked with red, the submarginal markings more strongly developed. Hindwing grey at the base in both sexes, only in rare exceptional cases with a red basal spot above.

== Status ==
It is a rare butterfly and declining due to changes in its habitat and is thus considered to be vulnerable. More information is needed on this species.

== Gallery ==
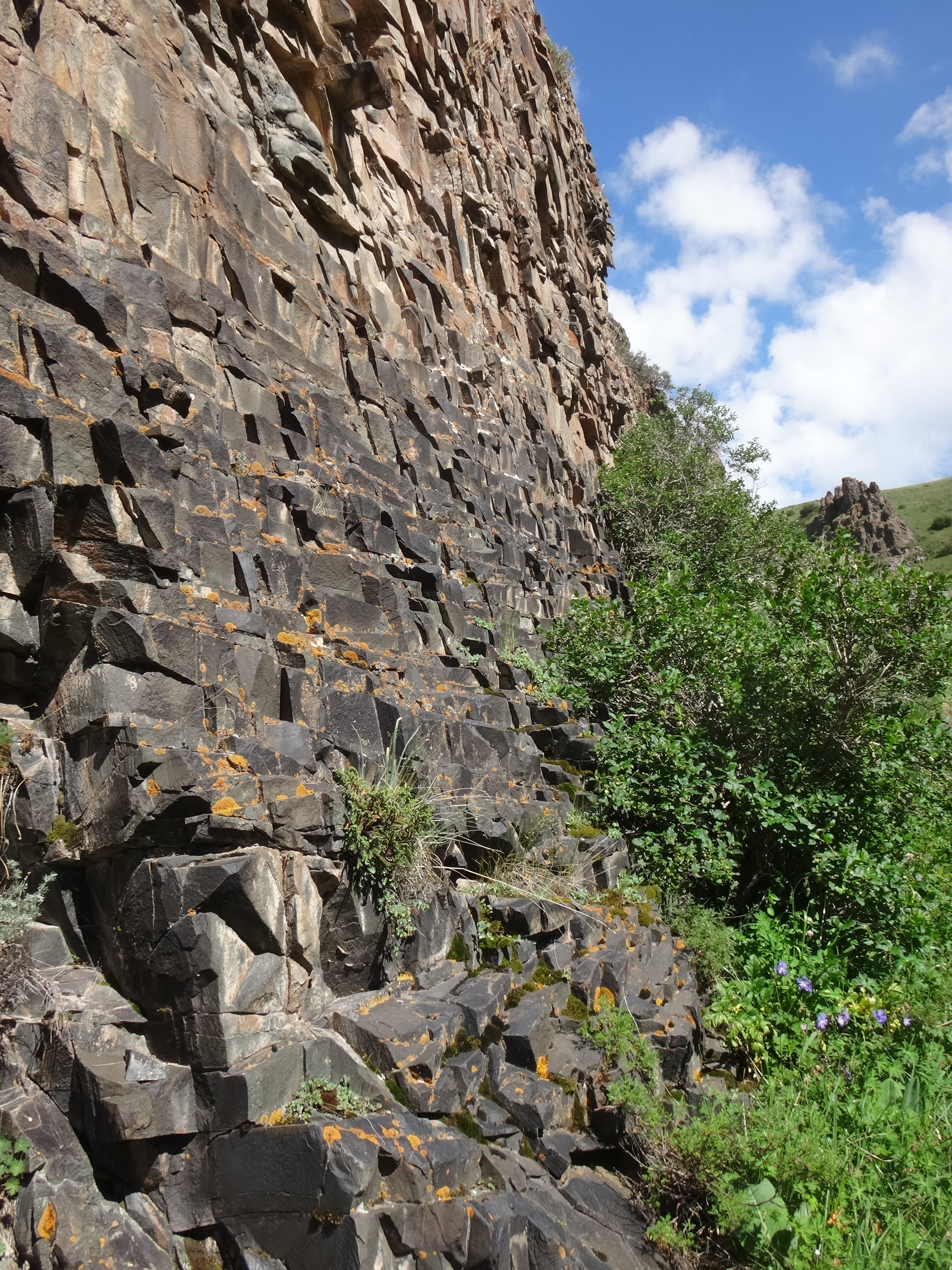
Biotop

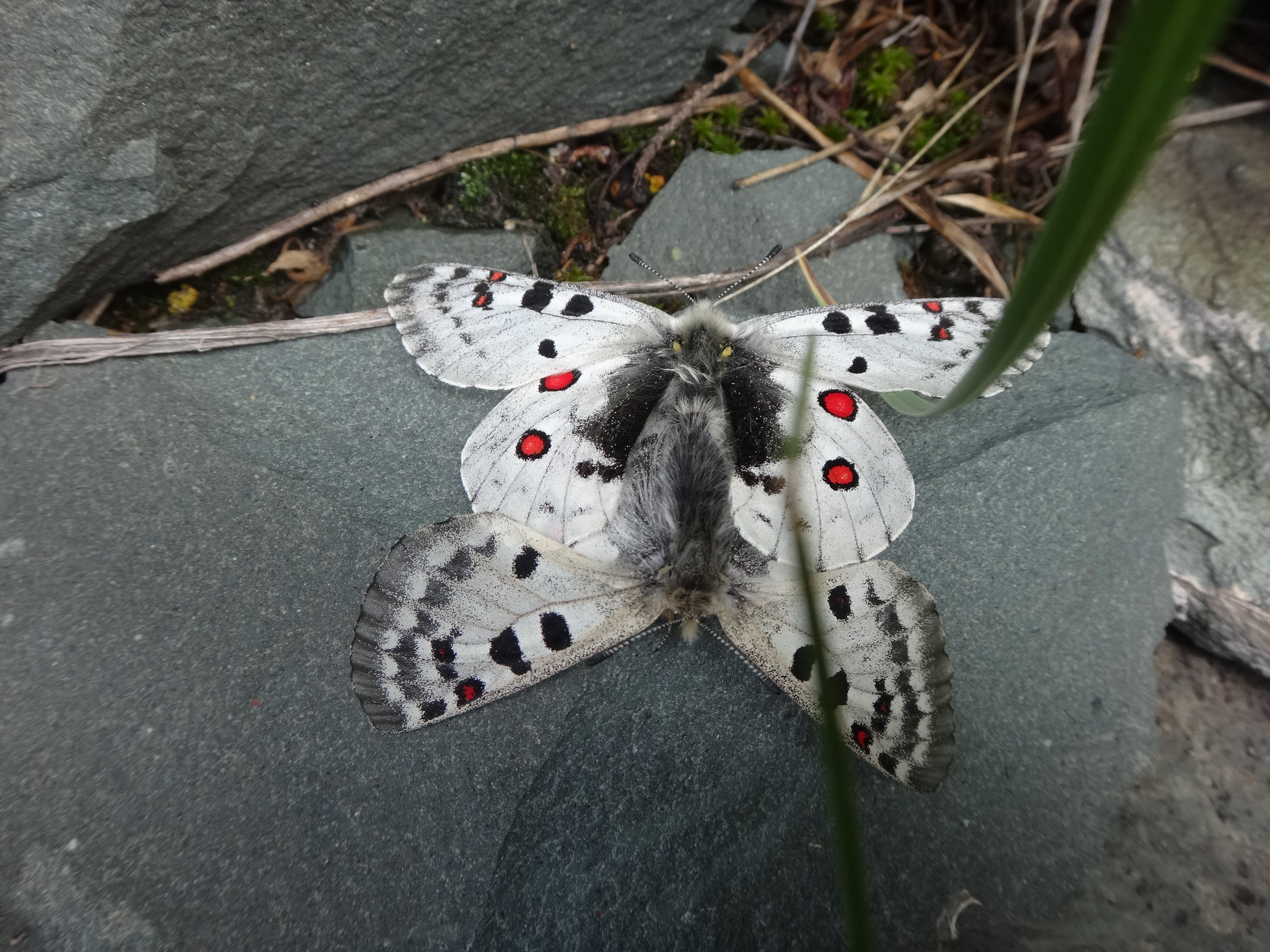
pairing

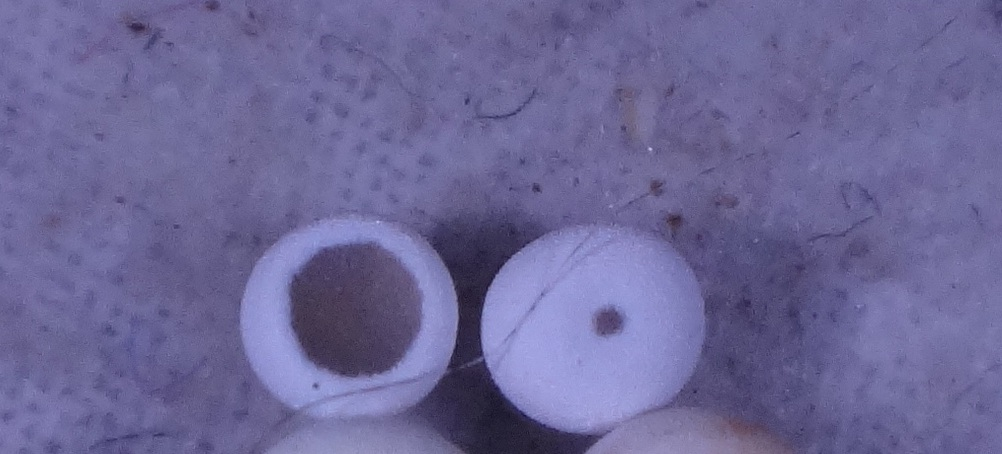
Eggs

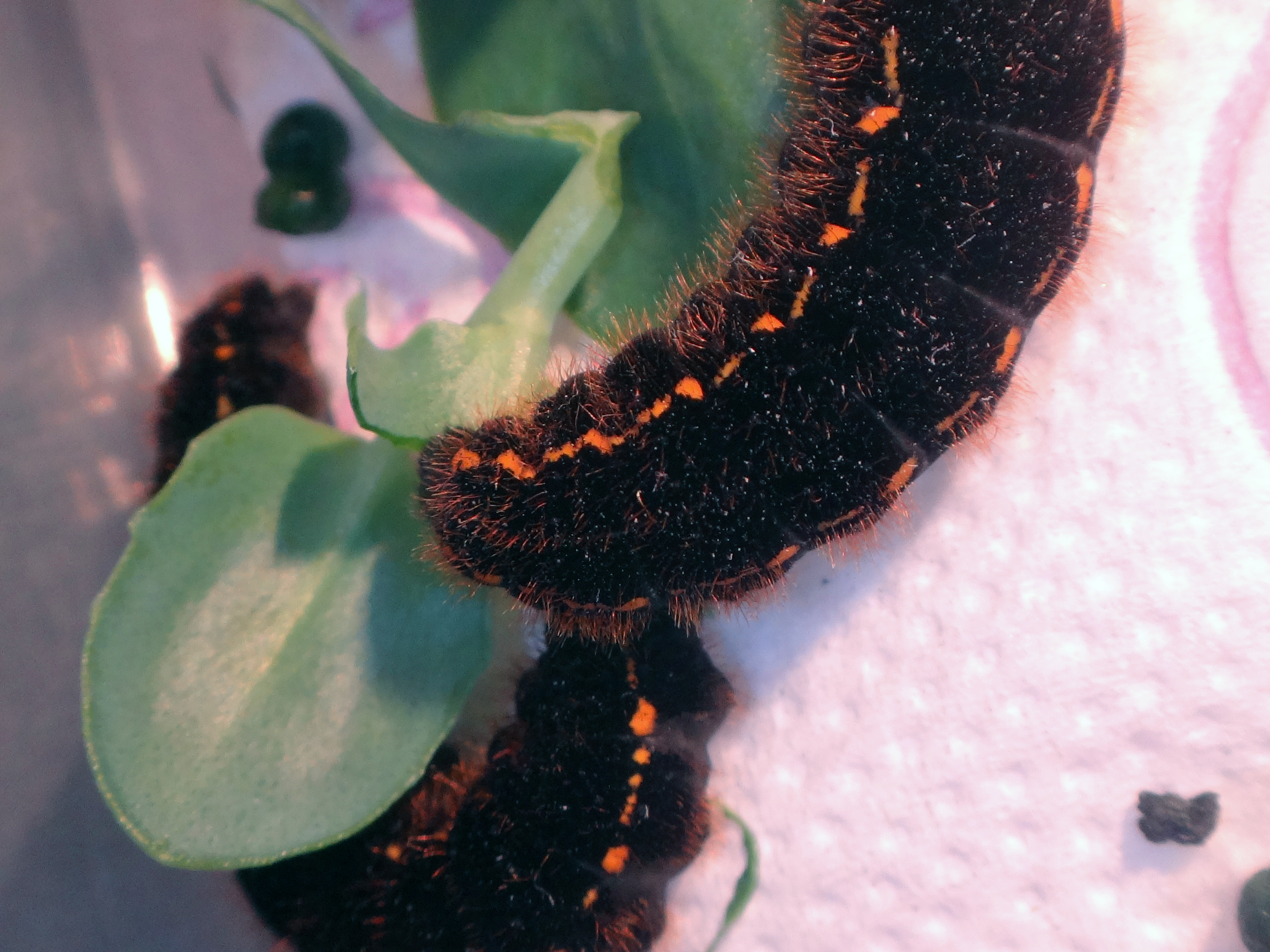
larva

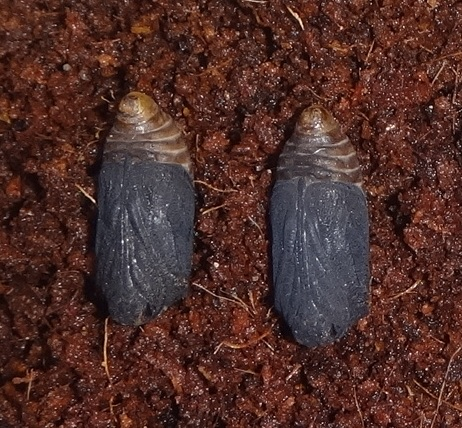
Pupae

== See also ==
- Papilionidae
- List of butterflies of India
- List of butterflies of India (Papilionidae)
