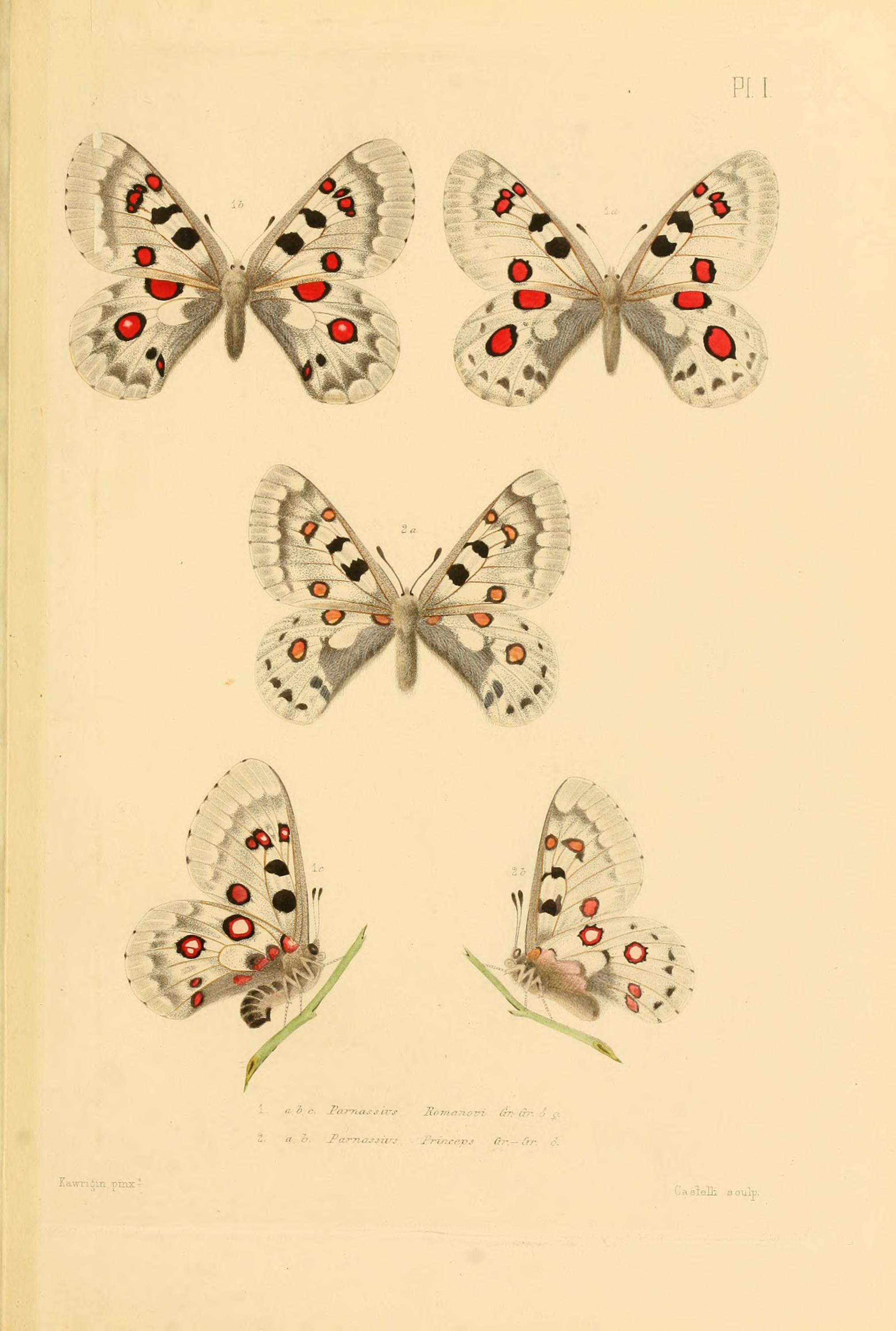

Scientific classification
- Kingdom: Animalia
- Phylum: Arthropoda
- Clade: Pancrustacea
- Class: Insecta
- Order: Lepidoptera
- Family: Papilionidae
- Genus: Parnassius
- Species: P. tianschanicus

Binomial name
- Parnassius tianschanicus (Oberthür, 1879)

Synonyms
- Parnassius romanovi Grum-Grshimailo, 1888

= Parnassius tianschanicus =

Large keeled Apollo

Species of butterfly

Parnassius tianschanicus, the large keeled Apollo, is a high-altitude butterfly. It is a member of the snow Apollo genus (Parnassius) of the swallowtail family, Papilionidae.

== Range ==
It is found in Uzbekistan, Tajikistan and Kyrgyzstan. Afghanistan, Pakistan, south-western China and Xinjiang, and reported from northern India (Jammu and Kashmir) by some authors by mistake.

== Status ==
Locally very common but generally a rare butterfly. It is declining due to changes in its habitat and is thus considered to be vulnerable. More information is needed on this species.

== See also ==
- Papilionidae
- List of butterflies of India
- List of butterflies of India (Papilionidae)
