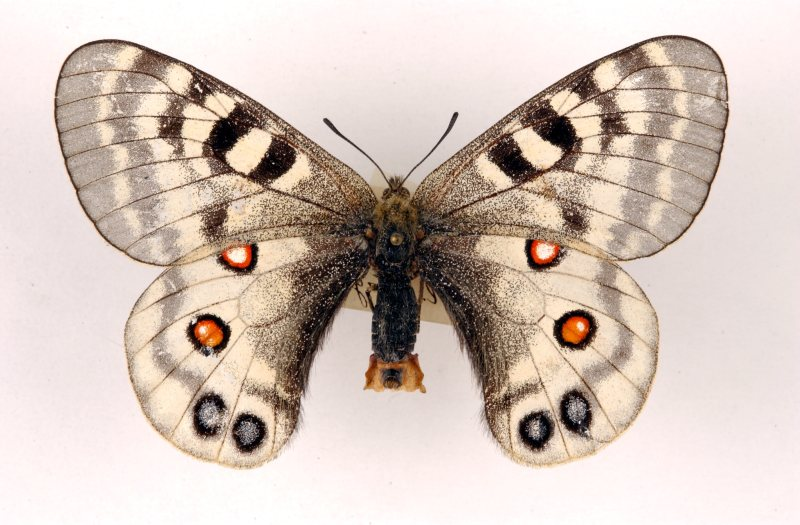
- Specimen from the Ulster Museum

Scientific classification
- Kingdom: Animalia
- Phylum: Arthropoda
- Class: Insecta
- Order: Lepidoptera
- Family: Papilionidae
- Genus: Parnassius
- Species: P. imperator

Binomial name
- Parnassius imperator Oberthür, 1883

= Parnassius imperator =

Species of butterfly

Parnassius imperator is a high-altitude butterfly which is found in western China and north-east India. It is a member of the generally white, high-elevation genus Parnassius, known as snow Apollos, of the family Papilionidae, known as swallowtails (although they lack tails).

It has over 40 subspecies, including the critically endangered Himalayan species P. i. augustus, commonly known as the imperial Apollo. Apollo Augustus, the imperial Apollo, appeared on Roman coins of the second century CE.

When P. imperator comes to rest, its wings spread horizontally so that its body lies close to the ground, lessening attacks by strong winds.

== Description ==
Subspecies P. i. augustus was described by Hans Fruhstorfer in the 1907 book The Fauna of British India, Including Ceylon and Burma – Butterflies, Volume II:

♂ ♀. Upperside: creamy-white. Fore wing: costa and base closely irrorated with black scales; the usual short transverse medial and apical black bars across the cell, followed by irregularly sinuous, broad, transverse, dusky-black discal and postdiscal, complete bands that extend from the costa to the dorsum; the discal band very broad, below the apex of cell bent inwards and almost completely filling the base of interspaces 2 and 3; the terminal margin broadly dusky hyaline black. Hind wing: the dorsal margin up to the subcostal vein and downwards to a little above the tornus densely irrorated with black scales and with scattered long white hairs; an upper basal black-encircled crimson spot; another in the middle of interspace 7 and a third in interspace 5, the latter two centred with white ; beyond there is an irregular, sinuous, postdiscal dusky-black transverse band from costa to vein 4, posterior to which in interspaces 2 and 3 are two prominent round black subtornal spots, broadly centred with blue; lastly, the terminal margin narrowly dusky black. Cilia of both fore and hind wings prominently yellowish white.

Underside similar; glassy markings similar, but mostly seen by transparency from above: faint indications of an additional crimson spot at base of cell and base of interspace 1. Antenna brownish black, obscurely annulated with brown; head, thorax and abdomen black, the latter two studded with long white hairs. Exp. ♂ ♀ 79–84 mm. (3.1–3.35").

Hab. Eastern Himalayas, on the boundary between Sikkim and Tibet, at altitudes between 15,000 and 16,000 feet. This smaller and darker form of P. imperator, Oberthür, from Eastern Tibet, just enters into our limits.

== Range ==
“North-eastern India (Sikkim), western China (Xizang Zizhiqu (Tibet), Qinghai, Gansu, Sichuan (Szechwan) and Yunnan).” One early siting in Tibet was by Antwerp Edgar Pratt, "... I returned to Ta-tsien-lu... I found time to search for the larvae of Parnassius Imperator and got about twenty, and one pupa"

== Status ==
P. imperator is "not known to be threatened as a species, but P. i. augustus is protected by law in India. It seems to be a common subalpine species in China." P. i. augustus was also included as a Schedule I subspecies in the Wildlife Protection Act, 1972. P. i. augustus was listed as "critically endangered" in the 1994 The Red Data Book on Indian Animals: Butterflies of India. P. imperator has been said to command a high price at European butterfly auctions in the past.

== Subspecies ==
There were twenty subspecies in 1985, and more than twice that now included in the Global Names Index:

- P. i. acalanatha Shinkai & Morita, 1995
- P. i. aino Bryk, 1932
- P. i. augustus Fruhstorfer, 1903
- P. i. aungsani Nose & Mikami, 1998
- P. i. cedermarki Bryk, 1934
- P. i. dominus Bang-Haas, 1934
- P. i. erlaensis Sugiyama, 1992
- P. i. evansi Bryk, 1932
- P. i. gigas Kotzsch, 1932
- P. i. haveli Kocman, 1995
- P. i. hoshinoi Kocman, 1999
- P. i. imperator Oberthür, 1883
- P. i. imperatrix Alph. 1897
- P. i. imposantus Schulte, 1991
- P. i. indra Korb 1997 - disputed validity
- P. i. interjungens Bryk 1932
- P. i. intermedius Rothschild 1909
- P. i. irmae Bryk, 1932
- P. i. jiyetiani Pierrat, 1990
- P. i. kameii Furumi & Sinkai, 1992
- P. i. karmapa Weiss & Michel, 1989
- P. i. kawasakii Sorimachi, 1992
- P. i. luxuriosus Mrácek & Schulte, 1990
- P. i. mahamayuri Shinkai & Morita, 1995
- P. i. milarepa Hamada, 2003
- P. i. musetta Bryk & Eisner, 1932
- P. i. musageta Grum-Grshimailo, 1891
- P. i. namchawarwanus Watanabe, 1995
- P. i. quaidami Kocman, 1995
- P. i. regina Bryk & Eisner, 1932
- P. i. regulus Bryk & Eisner, 1932
- P. i. rex Bang-Haas, 1928
- P. i. soi Sorimachi, 1997
- P. i. sultan Bryk & Eisner, 1932
- P. i. supremus Fruhstorfer, 1903
- P. i. takashii Ohya, 1990
- P. i. tara Shinkai, 1997
- P. i. titus Kocman, 1997
- P. i. tyrannus Bang-Haas, 1935
- P. i. uxoria Bang-Haas, 1935
- P. i. uxorius Bang-Haas, 1935
- P. i. vajramusti Oikawa, 1995
- P. i. venustus Stichel, 1906

== See also ==
- Papilionidae
- List of butterflies of India
- List of butterflies of India (Papilionidae)
