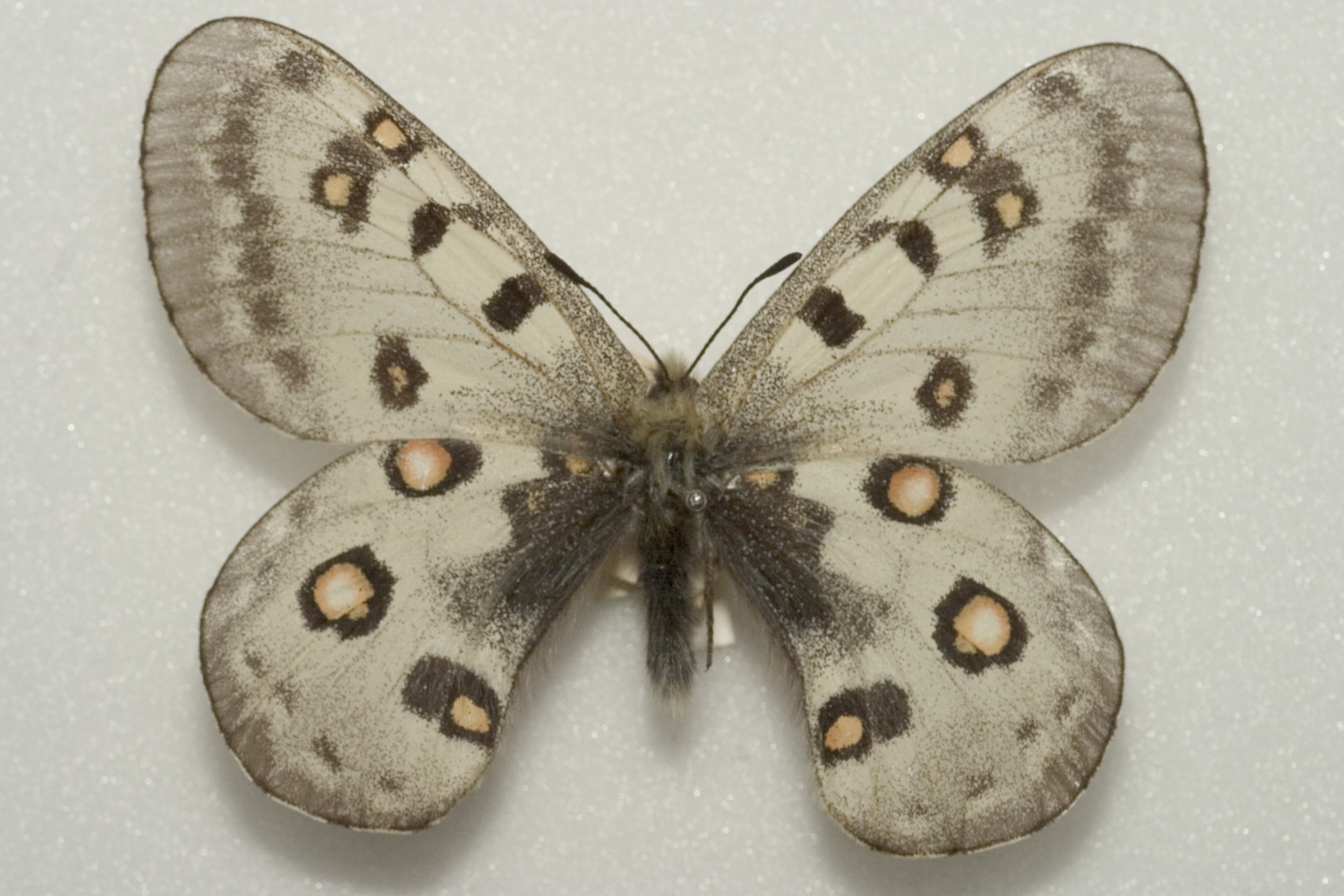

Scientific classification
- Domain: Eukaryota
- Kingdom: Animalia
- Phylum: Arthropoda
- Class: Insecta
- Order: Lepidoptera
- Family: Papilionidae
- Genus: Parnassius
- Species: P. honrathi

Binomial name
- Parnassius honrathi (Staudinger and A.Bang-Haas,1882

= Parnassius honrathi =

Honraths's Apollo

Species of butterfly

Parnassius honrathi, or Honrath's Apollo, is a high-altitude butterfly which is found in Tajikistan and Afghanistan. It is a member of the snow Apollo genus (Parnassius) of the swallowtail family (Papilionidae).

The butterfly was named to honour Eduard Honrath. It flies on mountain slopes at 2,500-3,000 m above sea level. The larva feeds on Pseudosedum.

== Diagnostic characters ==
It bears a very distant similarity to P. apollonius on account of the external spots of the forewing and the basal one of the hindwing being filled in with red; it differs, however, from that insect specifically in the marginal pattern of the wings. Special distinctions the black venter, legs and antenna are mentioned, the fringes being chequered black and white or entirely black.
