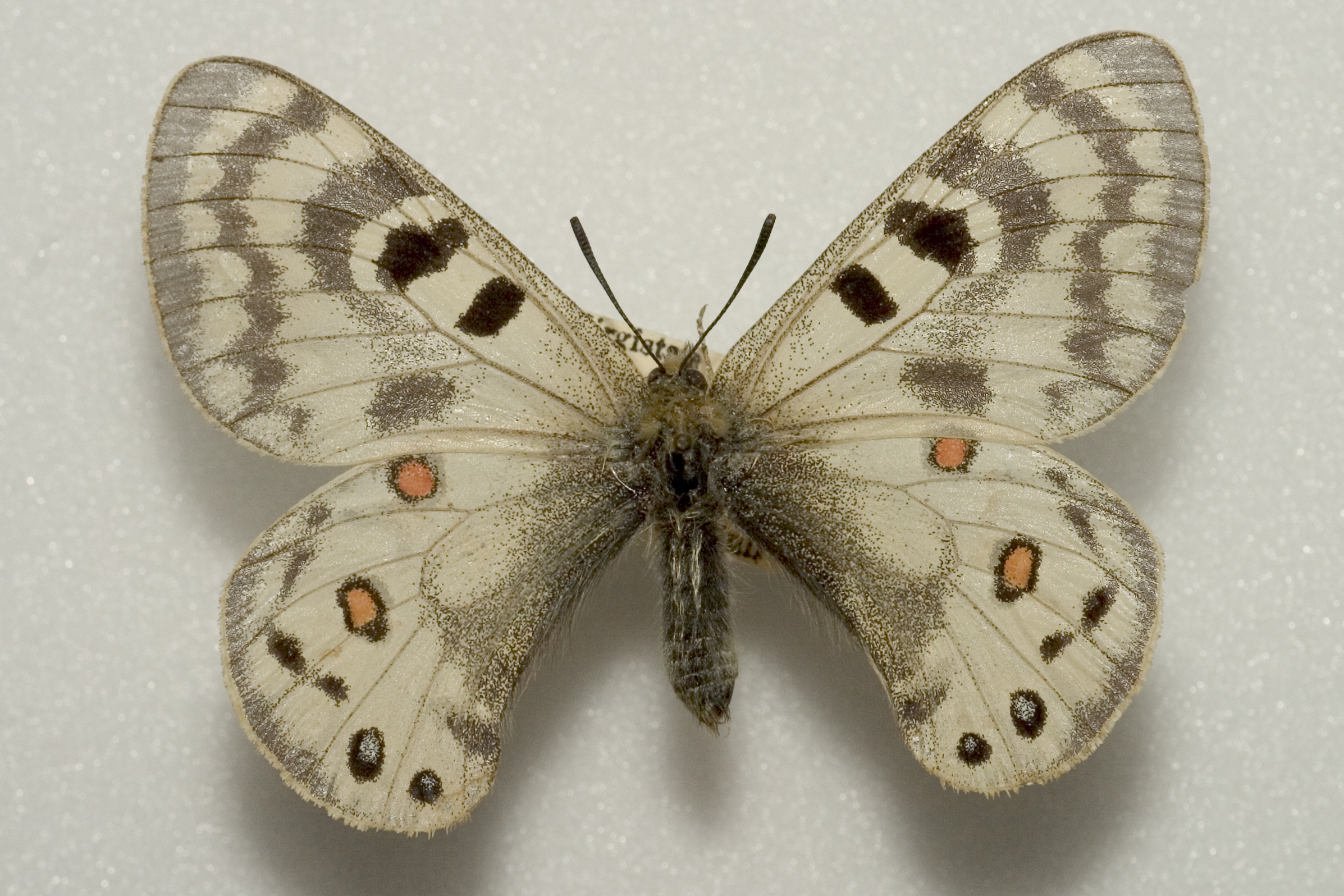

Scientific classification
- Domain: Eukaryota
- Kingdom: Animalia
- Phylum: Arthropoda
- Class: Insecta
- Order: Lepidoptera
- Family: Papilionidae
- Genus: Parnassius
- Species: P. maximinus

Binomial name
- Parnassius maximinus Staudinger, 1891

= Parnassius maximinus =

Species of butterfly

Parnassius maximinus is a high-altitude butterfly which is found in western ranges of the Tien Shan Mountains. It is a member of the snow Apollo genus (Parnassius) of the swallowtail family (Papilionidae). Previously it was regarded as conspecific with P. delphius.

== Description ==
It is larger than P. delphius. Its submarginal spots are heavy and contiguous. The hindwing is almost without a marginal band, but with two very large blue-centred anal spots and two likewise blue scaled.
