= Parnassius kiritshenkoi =

Scientific classification
- Domain: Eukaryota
- Kingdom: Animalia
- Phylum: Arthropoda
- Class: Insecta
- Order: Lepidoptera
- Family: Papilionidae
- Genus: Parnassius
- Species: P. kiritshenkoi

Binomial name
- Parnassius kiritshenkoi (Avinoff, 1910)

Species of butterfly

Parnassius kiritshenkoi is a high-altitude butterfly which is found only in the eastern Pamir Mountains. It is a member of the snow Apollo genus Parnassius of the swallowtail family, Papilionidae. The species was first described by Andrey Avinoff in 1910 as a subspecies of Parnassius delphius.

For many years, P. kiritshenkoi was regarded as a subspecies of Parnassius staudingeri. It is however sympatric with P. staudingeri mustagata of the Sarykolsky Mountains and with P. staudingeri illustris of the Zaalaisky Mountains.
