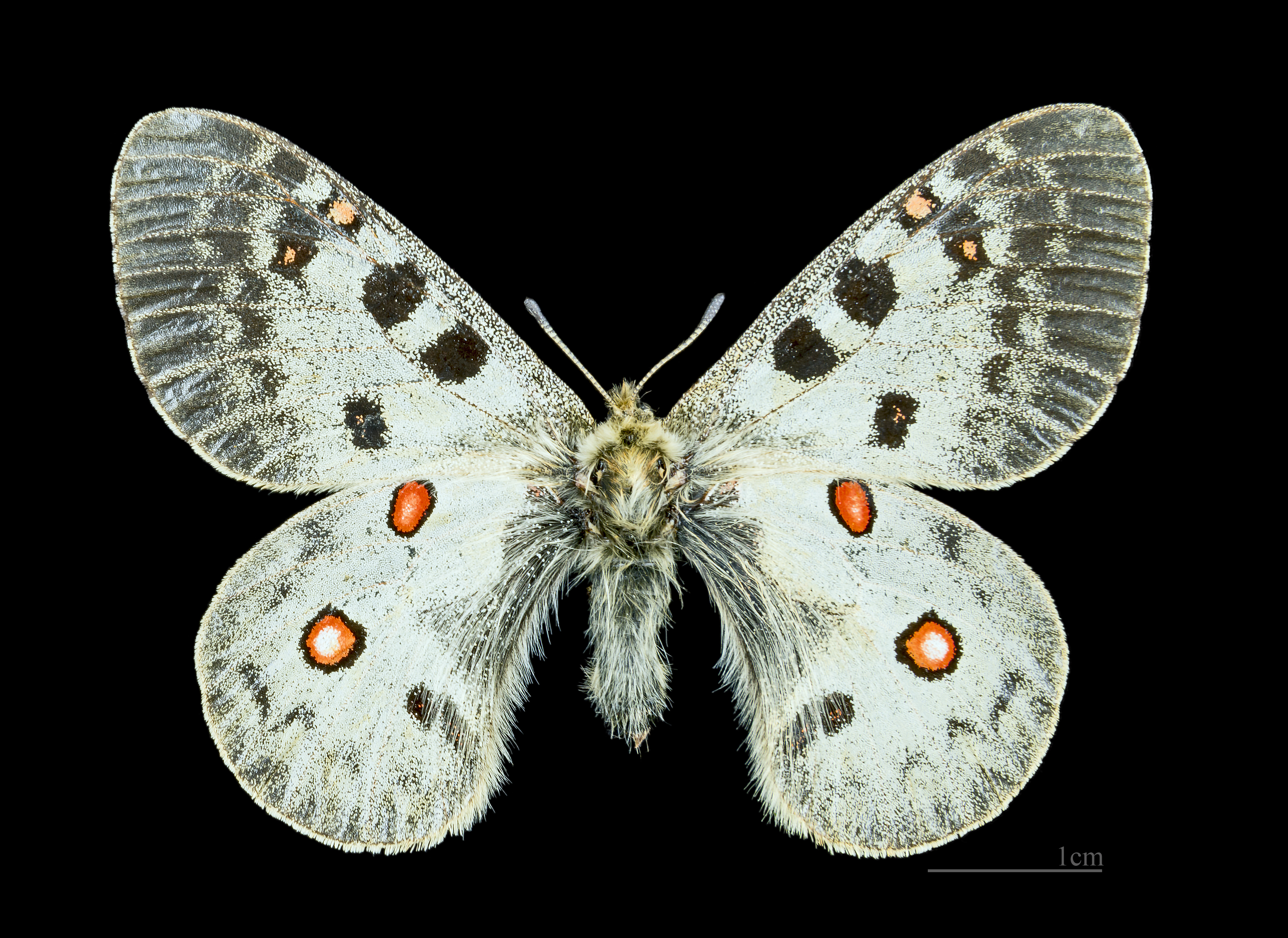
- Parnassius phoebus

Scientific classification
- Kingdom: Animalia
- Phylum: Arthropoda
- Class: Insecta
- Order: Lepidoptera
- Family: Papilionidae
- Tribe: Parnassiini
- Genus: Parnassius

Type species
- Papilio apollo Linnaeus, 1758

= Parnassius =

Genus of insects

Parnassius is a genus of northern circumpolar and montane (alpine and Himalayan) butterflies usually known as Apollos or snow Apollos. They can vary in colour and form significantly based on their altitude. They also exhibit altitudinal melananism, a high-altitude adaptation. They have dark bodies and darker coloring at the base of their wings, which allows them to absorb solar energy more quickly.

Although classified under the swallowtail butterfly family, none of the Parnassius species possesses tails.

The larvae feed on species of plants belonging to the Papaveraceae and Crassulaceae families, and like the other swallowtail butterfly larvae, possess an osmeterium. Unlike most butterflies that have exposed pupae, they pupate inside a loose silken cocoon.

== Identification and ecology ==
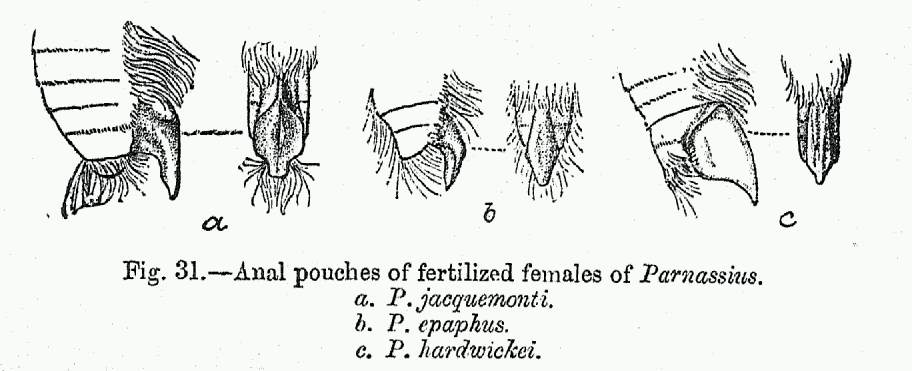
Species differences in female genitalia

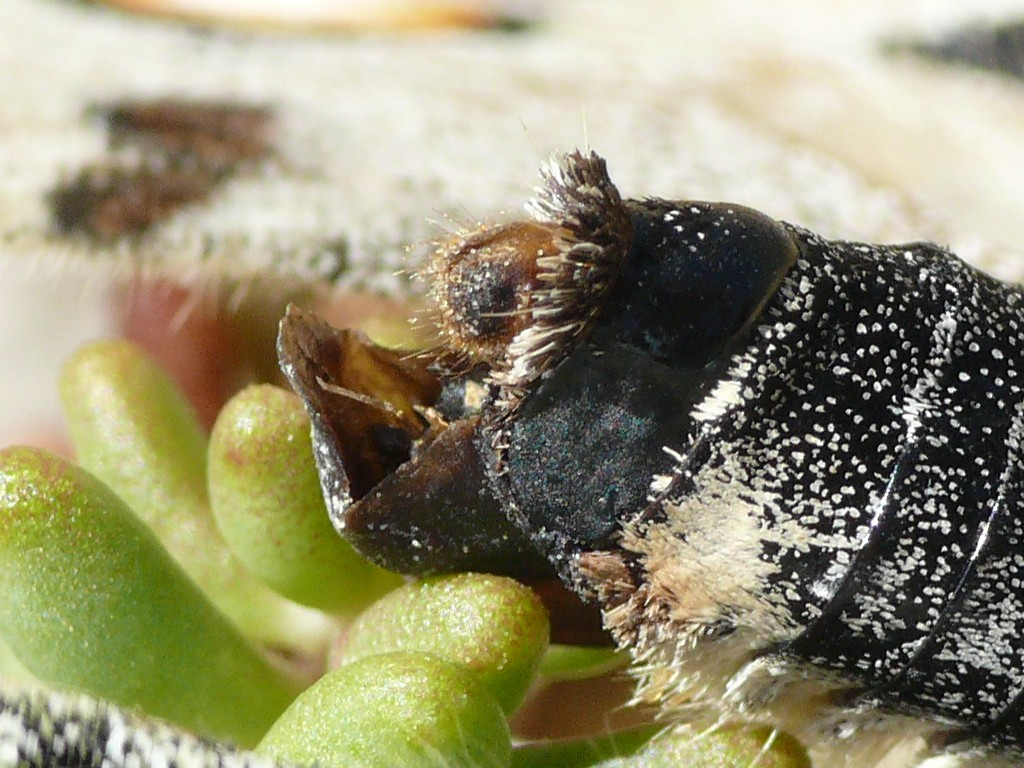
Sphragis (mating plug) in female Parnassius apollo

Parnassius species of butterflies are often hard to identify and can sometimes only be identified by dissection of the genitalia. The phylogeny of the group is still under study using molecular techniques. The exact number of species within the genus is disputed and numbers range from 38 to 47.

The Parnassius butterflies also have a peculiar reproductive strategy in that the male has special accessory glands that produce a mating plug that seals the female genitalia after mating. This is believed to ensure the success of the male and to prevent other males from mating and avoids sperm competition.

Butterflies of this genus have been widely used models to study metapopulations, population genetics and gene flow. Their patchy distribution and restricted migration makes them vulnerable to the effects of genetic drift and considerable colour variations can exist in individuals from different regions.

== Species ==
Species include:

- Parnassius acco
- Parnassius acdestis
- Parnassius actius
- Parnassius andreji
- Parnassius apollo
- Parnassius apollonius
- Parnassius arcticus
- Parnassius ariadne
- Parnassius autocrator
- Parnassius baileyi
- Parnassius behrii
- Parnassius boedromius
- Parnassius bremeri
- Parnassius cardinal
- Parnassius charltonius
- Parnassius cephalus
- Parnassius clodius
- Parnassius davydovi
- Parnassius delphius
- Parnassius dongalaicus
- Parnassius epaphus
- Parnassius eversmanni
- Parnassius felderi
- Parnassius glacialis
- Parnassius hardwickii
- Parnassius hide
- Parnassius honrathi
- Parnassius huberi
- Parnassius hunnyngtoni
- Parnassius imperator
- Parnassius inopinatus
- Parnassius jacobsoni
- Parnassius jacquemontii
- Parnassius kiritshenkoi
- Parnassius labeyriei
- Parnassius loxias
- Parnassius maharaja
- Parnassius maximinus
- Parnassius mnemosyne
- Parnassius nandadevinensis
- Parnassius nomion
- Parnassius nordmanni
- Parnassius nosei
- Parnassius orleans
- Parnassius patricius
- Parnassius phoebus
- Parnassius przewalskii
- Parnassius schultei
- Parnassius simo
- Parnassius simonius
- Parnassius smintheus
- Parnassius staudingeri
- Parnassius stenosemus
- Parnassius stoliczkanus
- Parnassius stubbendorfi
- Parnassius szechenyii
- Parnassius tenedius
- Parnassius tianschanicus
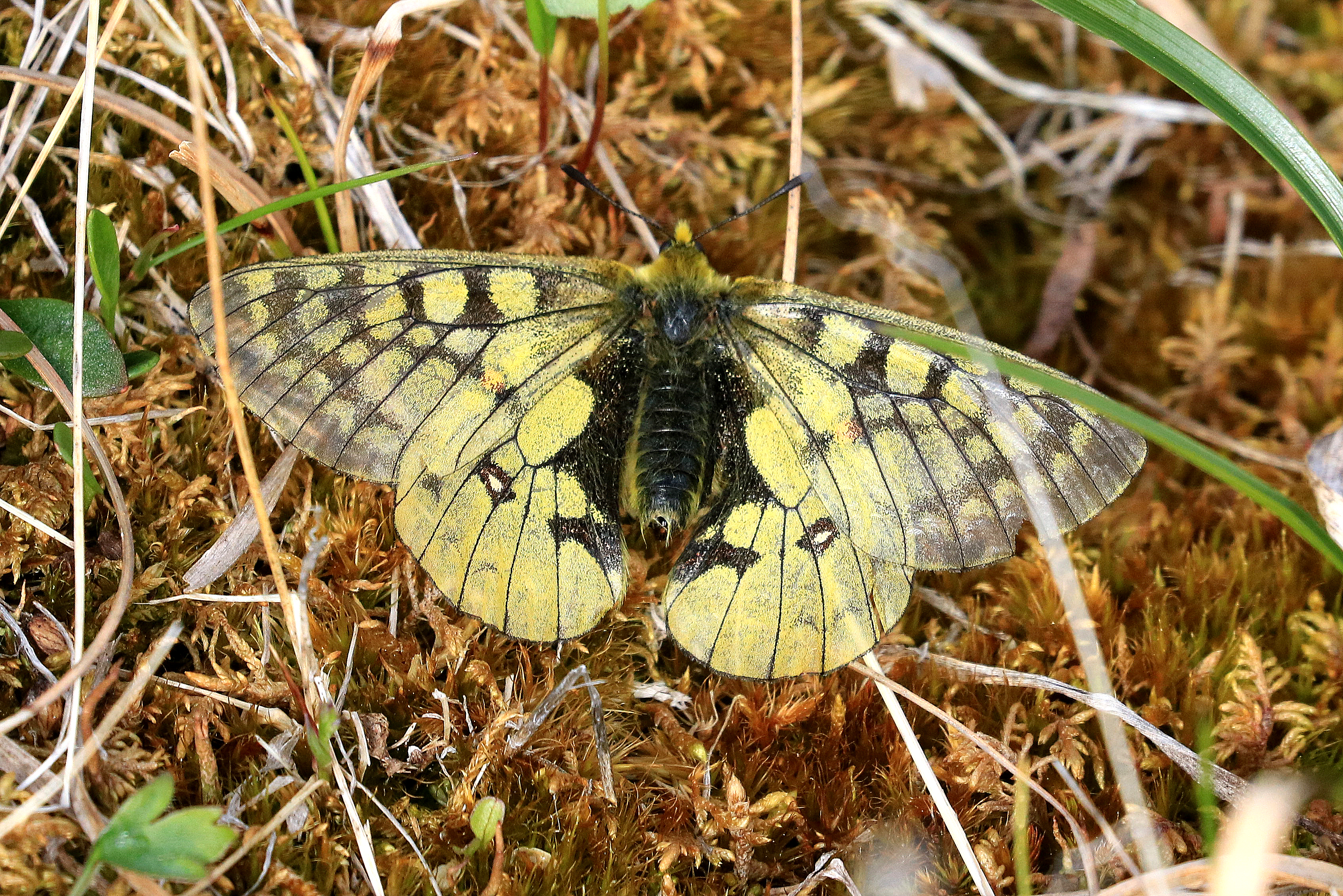
Parnassius eversmanni

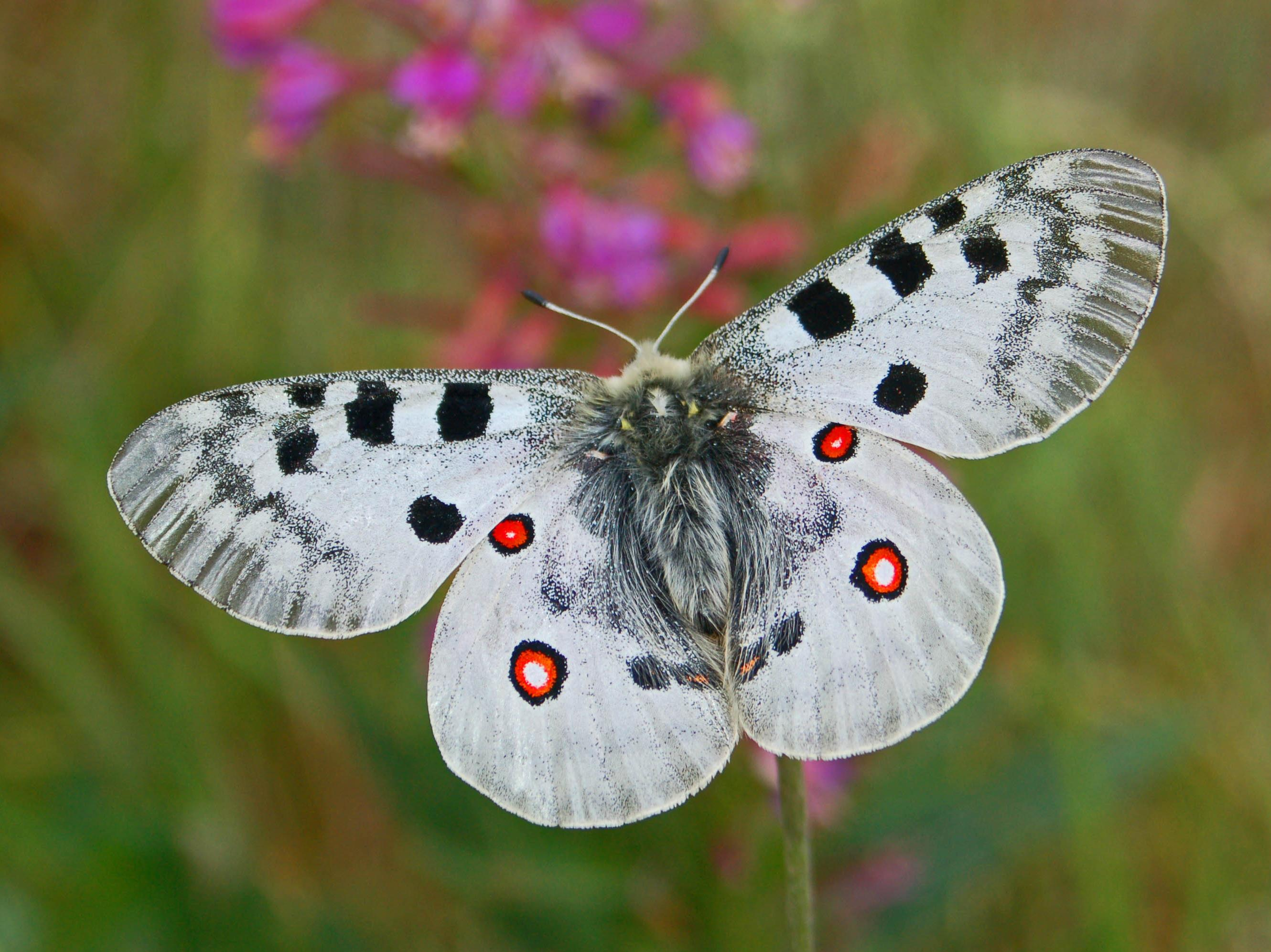
Parnassius apollo

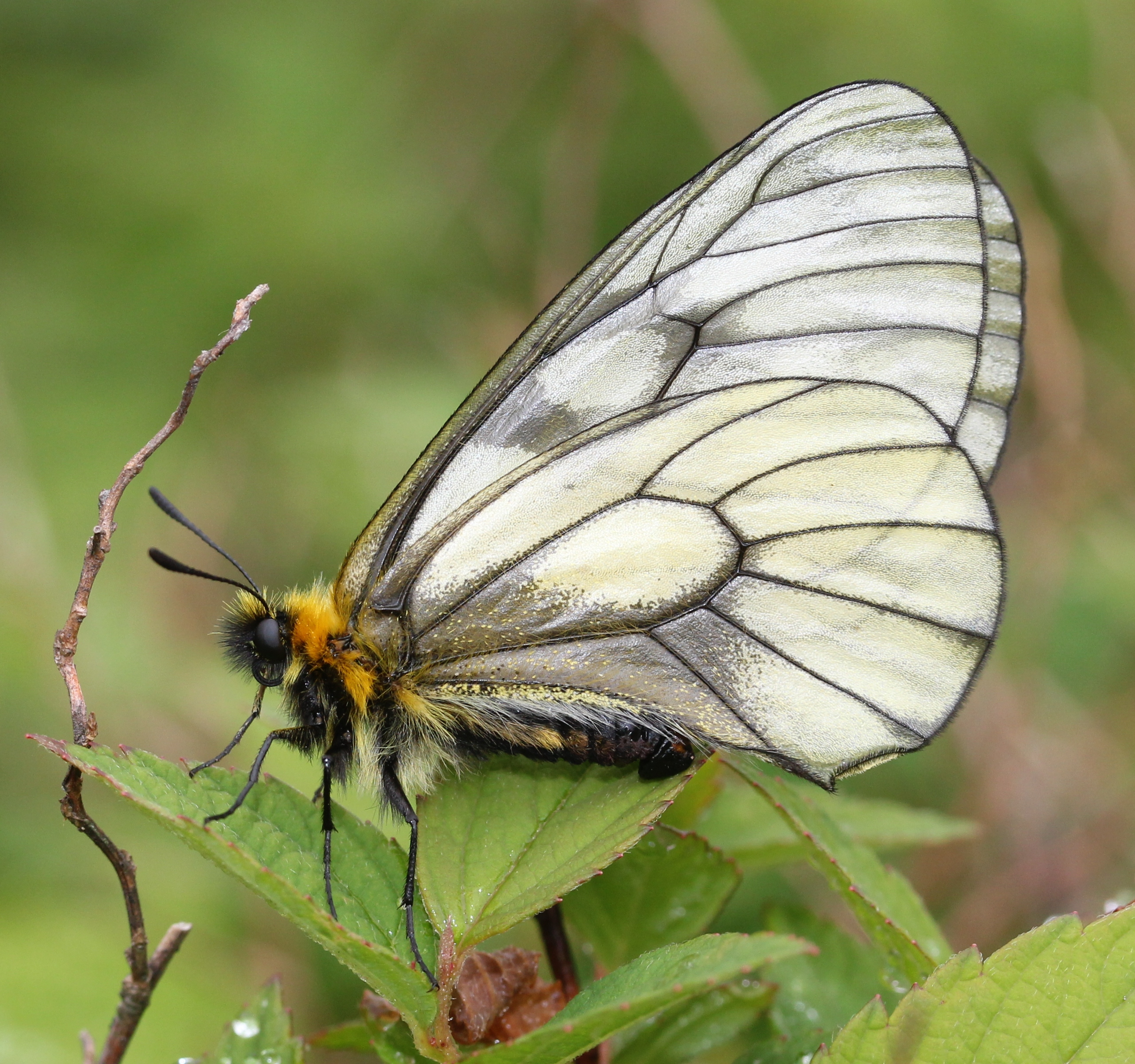
Parnassius glacialis

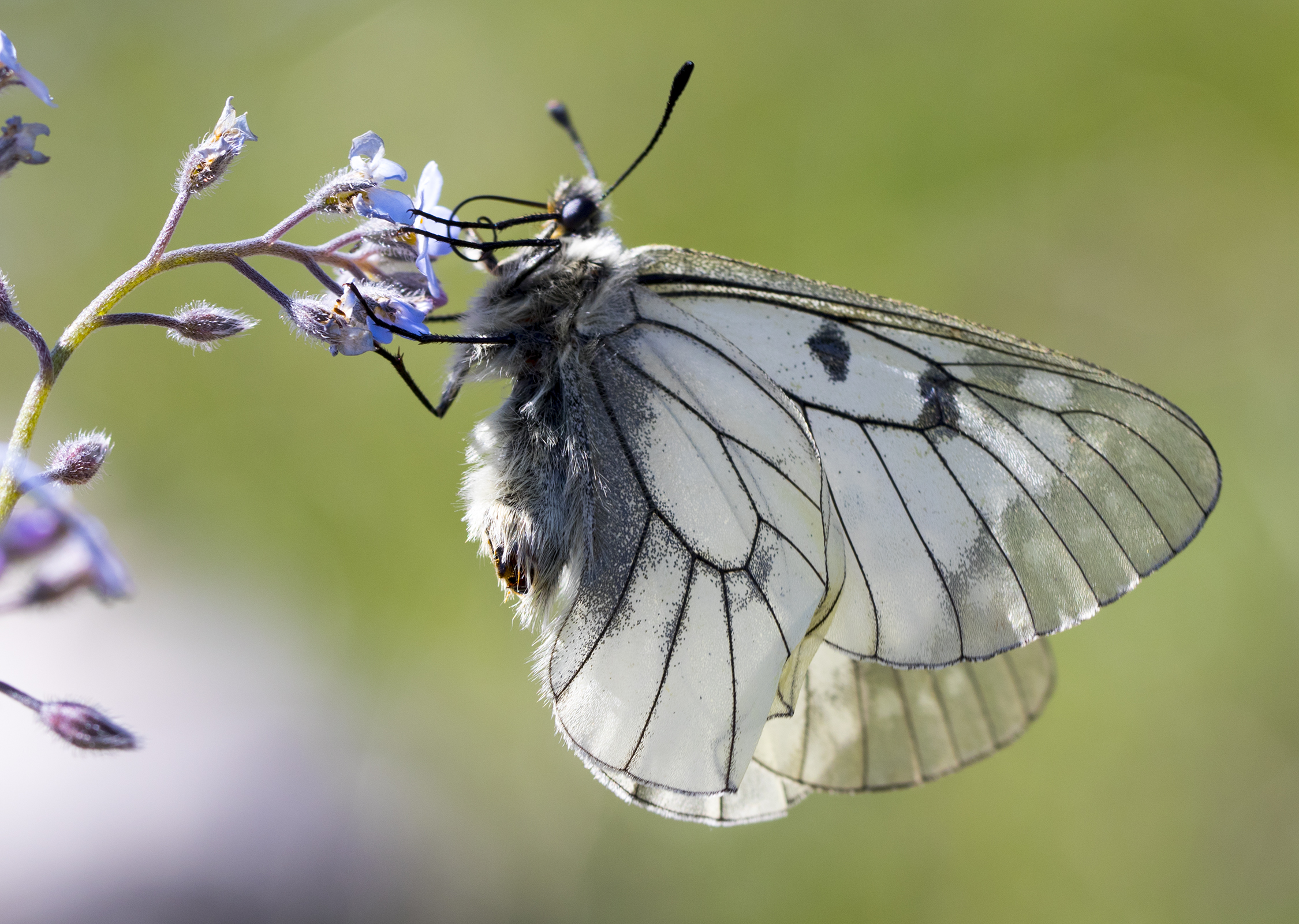
Parnassius mnemosyne

== Synonymy ==
- Parnassinae
  - Parnassiini
    - Hypermnestra
    - Parnassius
  - Luehdorfiini
    - - Archon
      - Doritites bosniackii
    - Luehdorfia
  - Zerythiini
    - Sericinus
    - - Bhutanitis
      - - Zerynthia
        - Allancastria
  - ? Thaites

A proposed phylogeny of the Parnassius and related groups.

Eight subgenera are recognized within the genus:

- Driopa Korshunov, 1988 - type species: Papilio mnemosyne Linnaeus, 1758
- Sachaia Korshunov, 1988 - type species: Parnassius tenedius Eversmann, 1851
- Parnassius Latreille, 1804; Nouv. Dict. Hist. nat. 24 (6): 185, 199 - type species: Papilio apollo Linnaeus
- Tadumia Moore [1902]; Lepidoptera Indica, 5 (53): 116 - type species: Papilio acco Gray
- Kailasius Moore, [1902]; Lepidoptera Indica, 5 (53): 118 - type species: Parnassius charltonius Gray
- Koramius Moore, [1902]; Lepidoptera Indica, 5 (53): 120 - type species: Parnassius delphius Eversmann
- Lingamius Bryk, 1935; Das Tierreich 65: 538-540 - type species: Parnassius hardwickii Gray
- Eukoramius Bryk, 1935; Das Tierreich 65: 630, 673-674 - type species: Parnassius imperator Oberthür

Other names that are no longer valid include:

- Parnassis Hübner, [1819]; Verz. bekannter Schmett. (6): 90 (or misspelled or emended?) - type species: Papilio apollo Linnaeus
- Therius Billberg, 1820; Enum. Ins. Mus. Billb.: 75 - type species: Papilio apollo Linnaeus
- Doritis Fabricius, 1807; Magazin f. Insektenk. (Illiger) 6: 283 - type species: Papilio apollo Linnaeus

== Evolutionary relationships ==
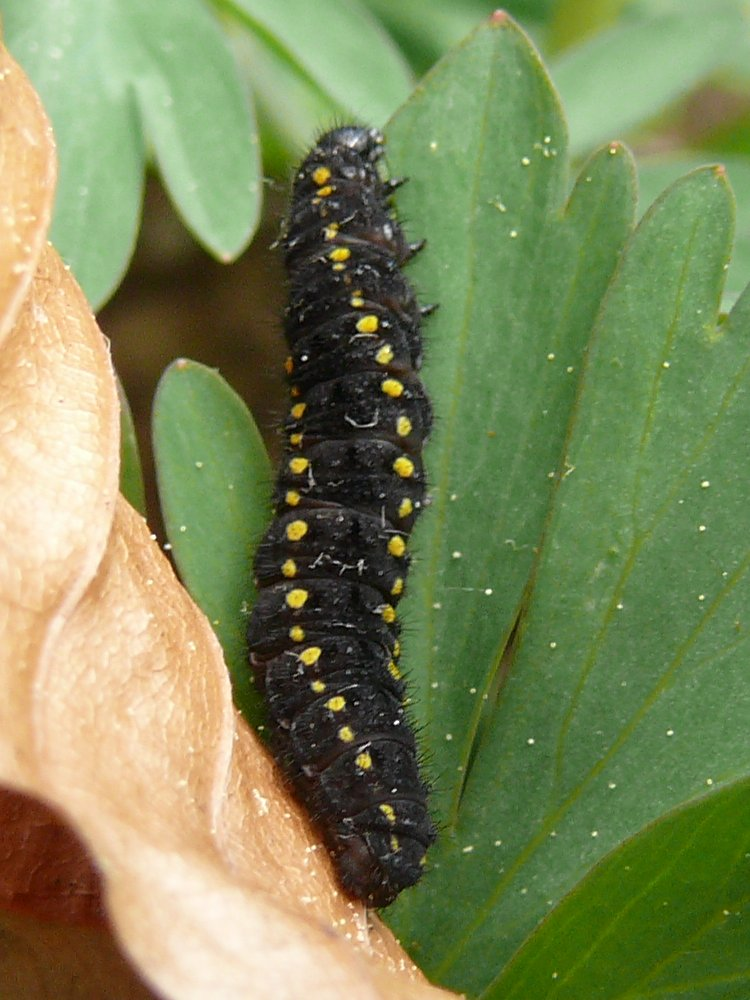
Parnassius mnemosyne caterpillar

A molecular phylogenetic study from 2008 suggests firstly that Baronia brevicornis Salvin 1893, rather than belonging to an outgroup Baroniinae belongs to Parnassiini, together with Hypermnestra and Parnassius. Secondly that the earliest split within the genus Parnassius is between subgenus Parnassius (the 'apollo' group, whose caterpillars feed on Crassulaceae, exceptionally Saxifragaceae) and the ancestor of the remaining seven subgenera. The existence of the subgenera is confirmed by molecular phylogenies. Six of the other subgenera have Fumariaceae as the larval food plant, while the larvae of the remaining genus Kreizbergia feed on Scrophulariaceae

== Important collections ==
- National Museum of Natural History, Leiden, (Rijksmuseum van Natuurlijke Historie) Curt Eisner collection: Types listed in Eisner, C. Parnassiidae-Typen in der Sammlung J.C.Eisner. Leiden. E.J.Brill, 1966. 190 pp. Col.frontispiece & 84 plts.(Zool. Verh. RMNH, 81). Review of worldwide species of Parnassiidae, 719 taxa included.
- Natural History Museum, London: Specimens largely determined by Curt Eisner types listed in Ackery, P. R. (1973): A list of the type-specimens of Parnassius (Lepidoptera: Papilionidae) in the British Museum (Natural History). Bulletin of the British Museum (Natural History) Entomology 29 (1) (9.XI.1973): 1—35, 1 pl.pdf
- Ulster Museum, Belfast, H.M Peebles collection: Type list available on CD (Nash, R and Eisner, C.)
- Muséum national d'histoire naturelle, Paris: Types listed by Bernardi, G., and Viette, P. 1966. Les types et typoides de Parnassius (s.l.) se trouvant au Museum de Paris. Bulletin de la Société entomologique de France 71 95–103, 163–166. 9 229–233, 304–309.
