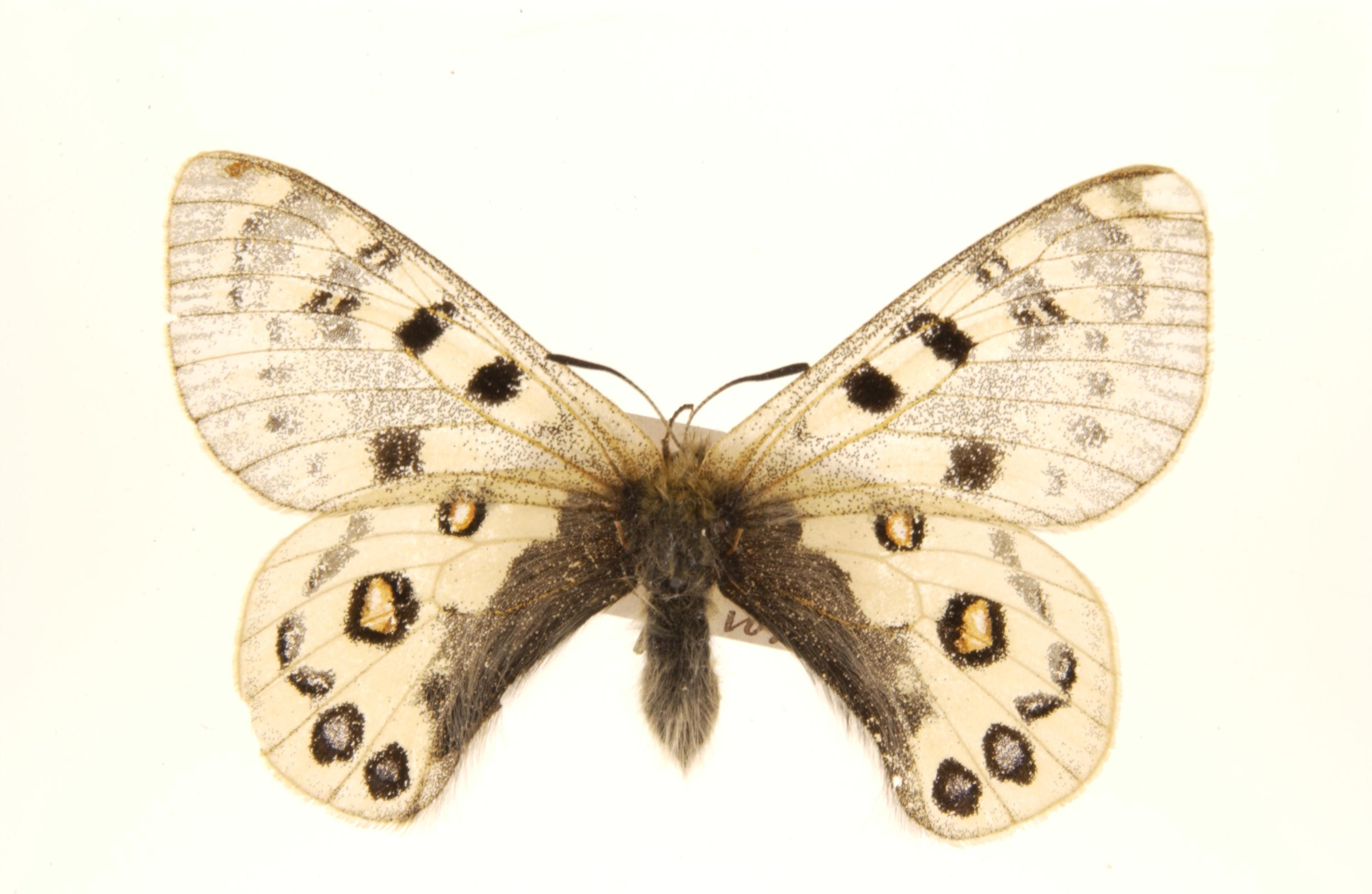

Scientific classification
- Kingdom: Animalia
- Phylum: Arthropoda
- Class: Insecta
- Order: Lepidoptera
- Family: Papilionidae
- Genus: Parnassius
- Species: P. szechenyii

Binomial name
- Parnassius szechenyii Frivaldsky, 1886

Synonyms
- Parnassius (Tadumia) choui Huang & Shi, 1994

= Parnassius szechenyii =

Species of butterfly

Parnassius szechenyii is a high-altitude butterfly which is found in western China (Qinghai, Gansu, Sichuan, Yunnan and Tibet). It is a member of the snow Apollo genus (Parnassius) of the swallowtail family, Papilionidae. The species was first described by Imre Frivaldszky in 1886.

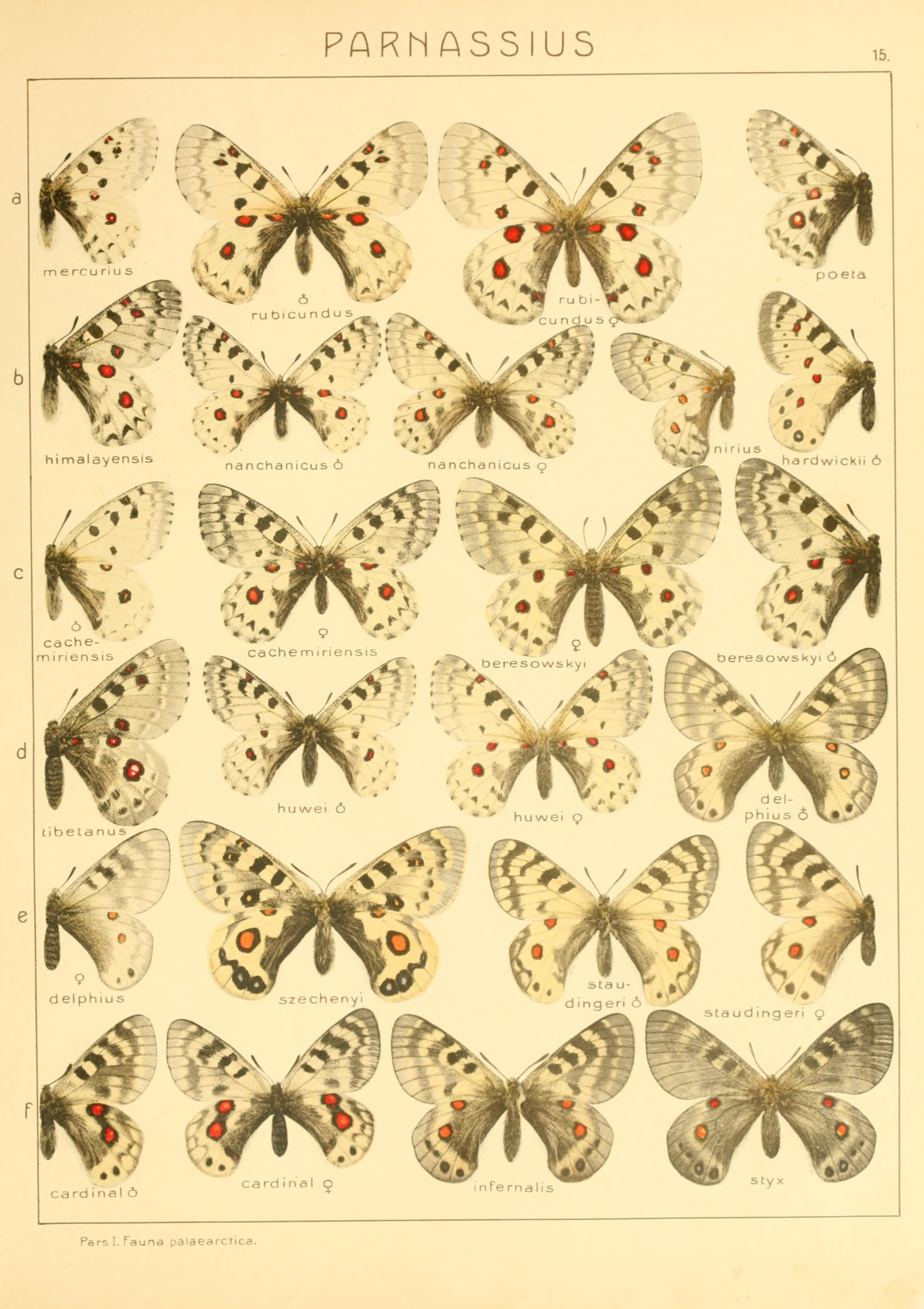
P. széchenyii is on line "e" second picture in Adalbert Seitz's Macrolepidoptera of the World

== Description ==
P. szechenyi is distinguished by a very broad vitreous margin to the forewing, this band together with the submarginal one forming a broad distal area which is divided by a row of white contiguous half moons proximally sharply bordered with black; costal and hindmarginal spots filled in with pale red, of the costal ones at least the posterior. Hindwing with large, red, white-pupilled ocelli, broad black posterior area strongly irrorated with white, and two large black anal spots with blue filling, from which emanates forward an anteriorly vitreous grey and posteriorly black submarginal band. Underside of a peculiar greasy gloss, somewhat yellowish, most markings only feebly shining through. Shaft of antenna and fringes of wings whitish. Amdo (Kuku-nor), North-East Tibet.- germanae Aust. is a form in which both sexes, but especially the female, have the disc of the forewing shaded with black; hindwing with dark marginal band, the submarginal band separated into spots, the large blue-centred anal spots being accompanied further forward by two similar spots and a blackish subapical spot. Ta-tsien-lu, western China.

== Subspecies ==
- Parnassius szechenyii szechenyii Frivaldsky, 1886
- Parnassius szechenyii choui Huang & Shi, 1994 China, Qinghai, Huzhu, 3500 m
- Parnassius szechenyii etsujii Morita, 1997 Tibet, 30 km west of Chali, 4700 m
- Parnassius szechenyii evacaki China, Qinghai, Qinghai-Nanshan, about 25 km north of Caka, 3500–4500 m

== Identification ==
The Parnassius species of butterflies are often hard to identify and can sometimes only be identified by dissection of the genitalia. P. R. Ackery (1975) provides a key available online.
