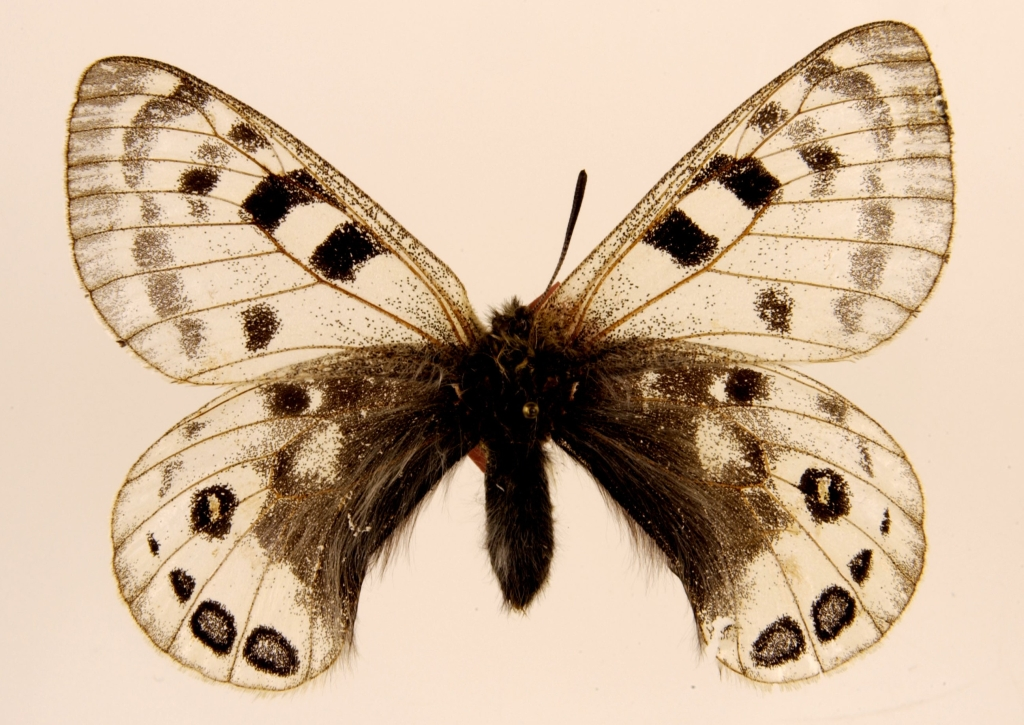
- Parnassius cephalus sengei Pullow

Scientific classification
- Domain: Eukaryota
- Kingdom: Animalia
- Phylum: Arthropoda
- Class: Insecta
- Order: Lepidoptera
- Family: Papilionidae
- Genus: Parnassius
- Species: P. cephalus

Binomial name
- Parnassius cephalus Grum-Grshimailo, 1891

= Parnassius cephalus =

Species of butterfly

Parnassius cephalus is a high altitude butterfly which is found in Tibet and west China. It is a member of the snow Apollo genus (Parnassius) of the swallowtail family, Papilionidae. The species was first described by Grigory Grum-Grshimailo in 1891.

== Description ==
Note: The wing pattern in Parnassius species is inconsistent and the very many subspecies and forms make identification problematic and uncertain. Structural characters derived from the genitalia, wing venation, sphragis and foretibial epiphysis are more, but not entirely reliable. The description given here is a guide only. For an identification key see Ackery P.R. (1975).

Ground-colour pure white; forewing with complete blackish submarginal band and a sometimes abbreviated discal one, as well as with white and black chequered fringes. Hindwing with very narrow dark margin, two blue anal spots, which are continued anteriorly by two further black spots and a submarginal band.

=== Subspecies ===
- P. c. dengkiaoping Weiss
- P. c. elwesi Leech
- P. c. erlaensis Sorimachi
- P. c. irene Bryk & Eisner
- P. c. micheli Weiss
- P. c. paimaensis Yoshino, 1997
- P. c. pythia Rothschild
- P. c. sengei (Bang-Haas)
- P. c. takensakai Koiwaya
- P. c. weissi Schulte
- P. c. yammatak
