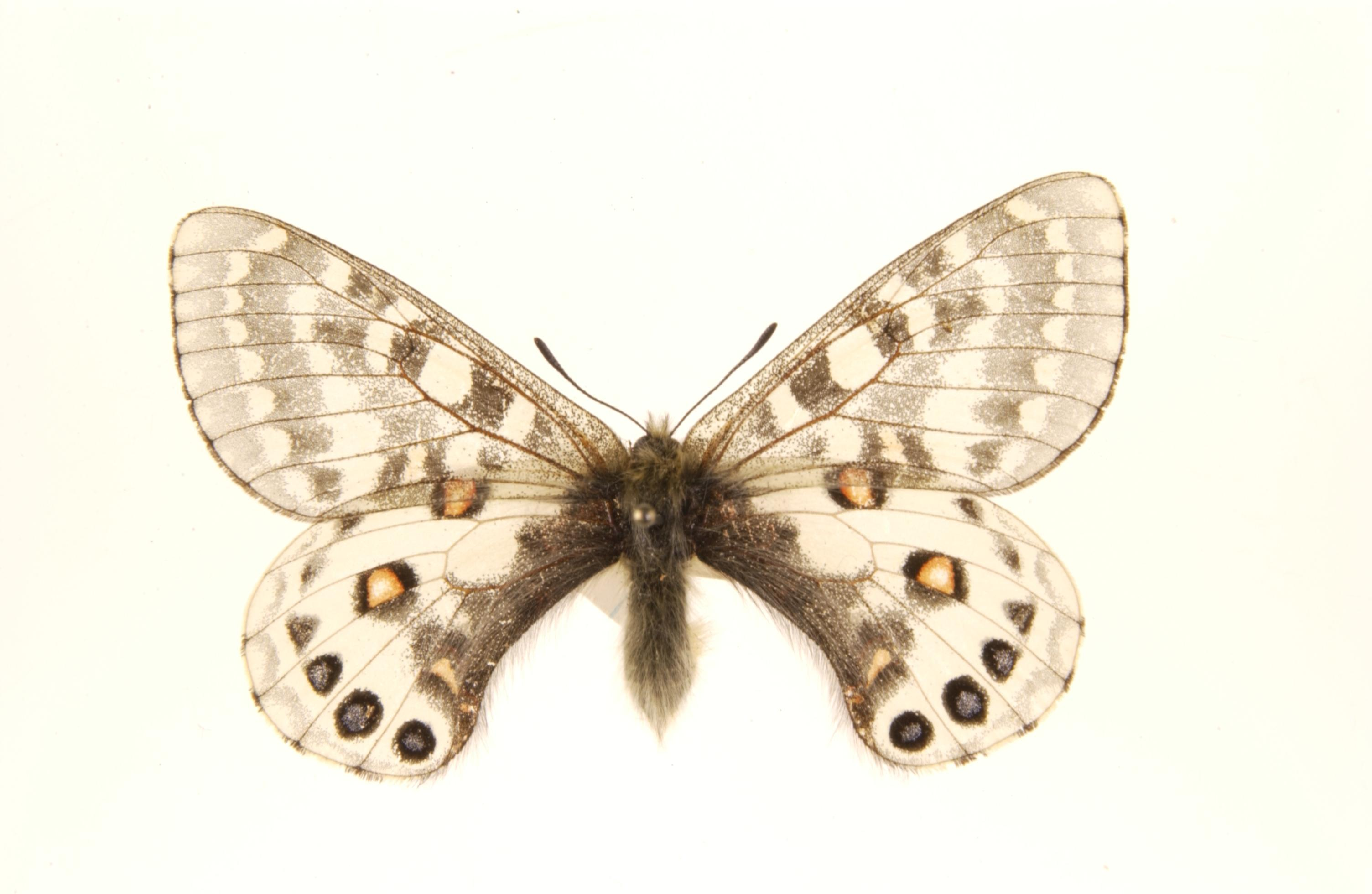

Scientific classification
- Domain: Eukaryota
- Kingdom: Animalia
- Phylum: Arthropoda
- Class: Insecta
- Order: Lepidoptera
- Family: Papilionidae
- Genus: Parnassius
- Species: P. orleans

Binomial name
- Parnassius orleans Oberthur, 1890

= Parnassius orleans =

Species of butterfly

Parnassius orleans is a high altitude butterfly which is found in Mongolia, western China and Tibet. It is a member of the snow Apollo genus (Parnassius) of the swallowtail family, Papilionidae. It was named after Prince Henri of Orléans who discovered it.

Note: The wing pattern in Parnassius species is inconsistent and the very many subspecies and forms make identification problematic and uncertain. Structural characters derived from the genitalia, wing venation, sphragis and foretibial epiphysis are more, but not entirely reliable. The description given here is a guide only. For an identification key see Ackery P.R. (1975).

== Description ==
Ground colour with a feeble yellow tint; forewing with the costal spots connected, band-like, including two or three red dots, hindmarginal spot likewise frequently filled in with red, between these spots a blackish discal shadow; marginal band moderately wide, interrupted by narrow white marginal spots; submarginal macular band deeply incised. Hindwing with large, red, white-centred ocelli, one or two anal spots, mostly also filled in with red, and with a submarginal row of four or five black spots partly filled in with blue. Female more sharply marked, the costal spots of forewing connected with the hindmarginal one by denser black shading, the submarginal spots of hindwing larger, brighter. Apart from these characters the general aspect very similar to that of Parnassius eversmanni. Tatsienlu, western China. — In the female of the smaller form groumi Oberth. from Amdo (Kuku-nor) the red is usually absent from the spots of the forewing, the spots themselves being very strongly marked, the black discal shadow stronger, ground colour of wings purer, submarginal band of forewing separated into spots and abbreviated, ocelli of hindwing bright red, anal spot black.
