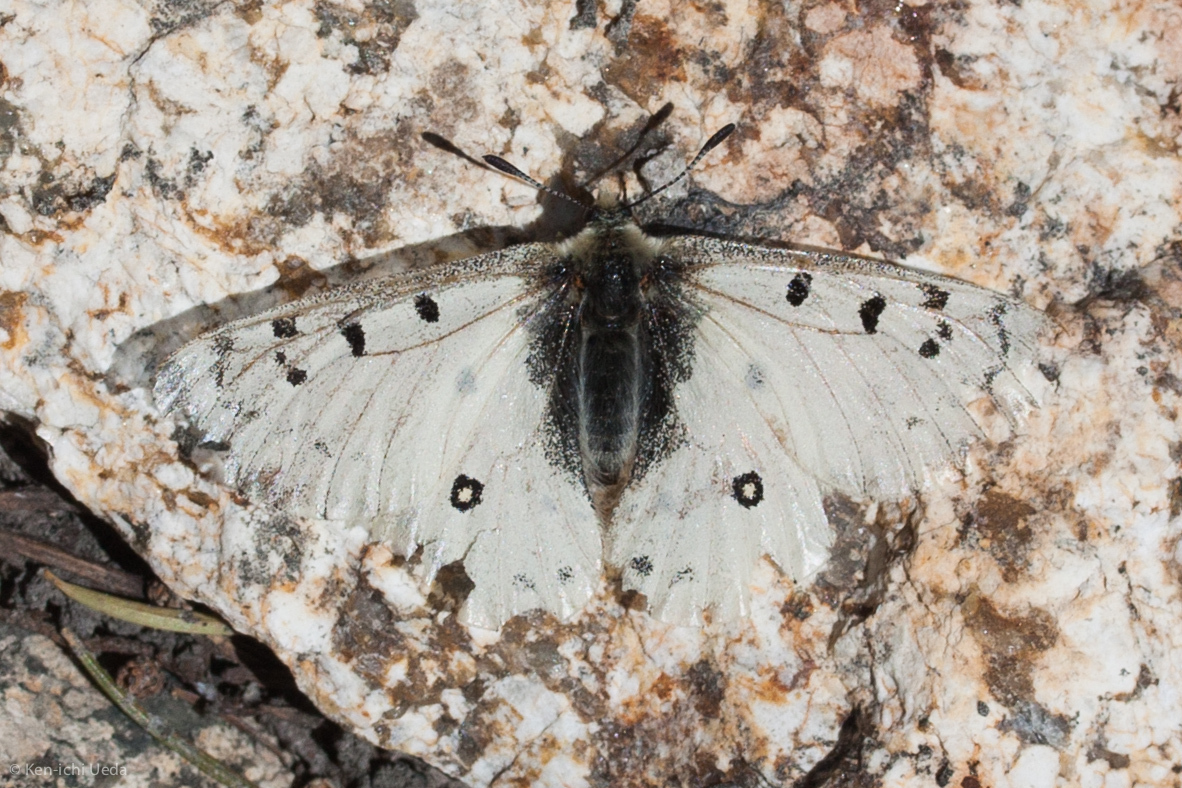

Scientific classification
- Domain: Eukaryota
- Kingdom: Animalia
- Phylum: Arthropoda
- Class: Insecta
- Order: Lepidoptera
- Family: Papilionidae
- Genus: Parnassius
- Species: P. behrii

Binomial name
- Parnassius behrii W. H. Edwards, 1870

= Parnassius behrii =

Sierra Nevada parnassian

Species of butterfly

Parnassius behrii, the Sierra Nevada parnassian, is a species of butterfly in the family Papilionidae. It is native to the Sierra Nevada of California, US, where it is found in habitats such as rock slides, alpine tundra, and stream edges. Adults use members of the family Asteraceae as nectar plants, and both adults and larvae use Sedum species as nectar and host plants. P. behrii has one flight from mid-July to early September.

The wingspan measures 4.9 to 5.3 centimeters (1.9 to 2.1 in). The dorsal forewing has two black spots and one to three yellow-orange spots along the costa. The hindwing has two yellow-orange spots. The abdomen has pale yellow hairs.

Males fly close to the ground when searching for females. The eggs are laid singly on many surfaces. The caterpillars feed on the leaves of the host plant and will sometimes consume the flowers and seeds. P. behrii hibernates as an egg.

== Description ==
A rather large form, in which the male usually has somewhat longer wings, the submarginal band is marked anteriorly by sharp black luniform spots, which become obsolete posteriorly, the anterior ones of the costal spots usually centred with red, the glossy border is confined to the anterior half, narrowed and so restricted by the white marginal spots that it only remains as a row of blackish wedge-shaped spots; ocelli of the hindwing small. The red yellow colouring of the ocelli and the development of small submarginal spots on the hindwing are given as special characteristics, but these features are not constant. The females as a rule have the costal spots on the forewing strongly filled in with red, a strongly marked submarginal band, the disc more or less dusted with black, on the hindwing the submarginal lunules are confluent as a sort of band and there are grey spots at the margin itself. The aspect on the whole like sayii female or a lighter hermodur [sayii var.] -female. California (Sierra Nevada), Utah.

== Etymology ==
- The species name honours Hans Hermann Behr.
