= Parnassius dongalaicus =

Tytler's Apollo

Scientific classification
- Kingdom: Animalia
- Phylum: Arthropoda
- Class: Insecta
- Order: Lepidoptera
- Family: Papilionidae
- Genus: Parnassius
- Species: P. dongalaicus

Binomial name
- Parnassius dongalaicus Tytler, 1926

Species of butterfly

Parnassius dongalaicus, the Tytler's Apollo, is a high-altitude butterfly which is found in China.

It is a member of the snow Apollo genus (Parnassius) of the swallowtail family (Papilionidae).

P. dongalaicus was originally described as a species, but was subsequently considered conspecific with Parnassius epaphus. Sorimachi (1995) and Sugisawa (1996) both regard P. dongalaicus as a good species sympatric with epaphus and as the senior synonym of rikihiroi Kawasaki, 1995.
