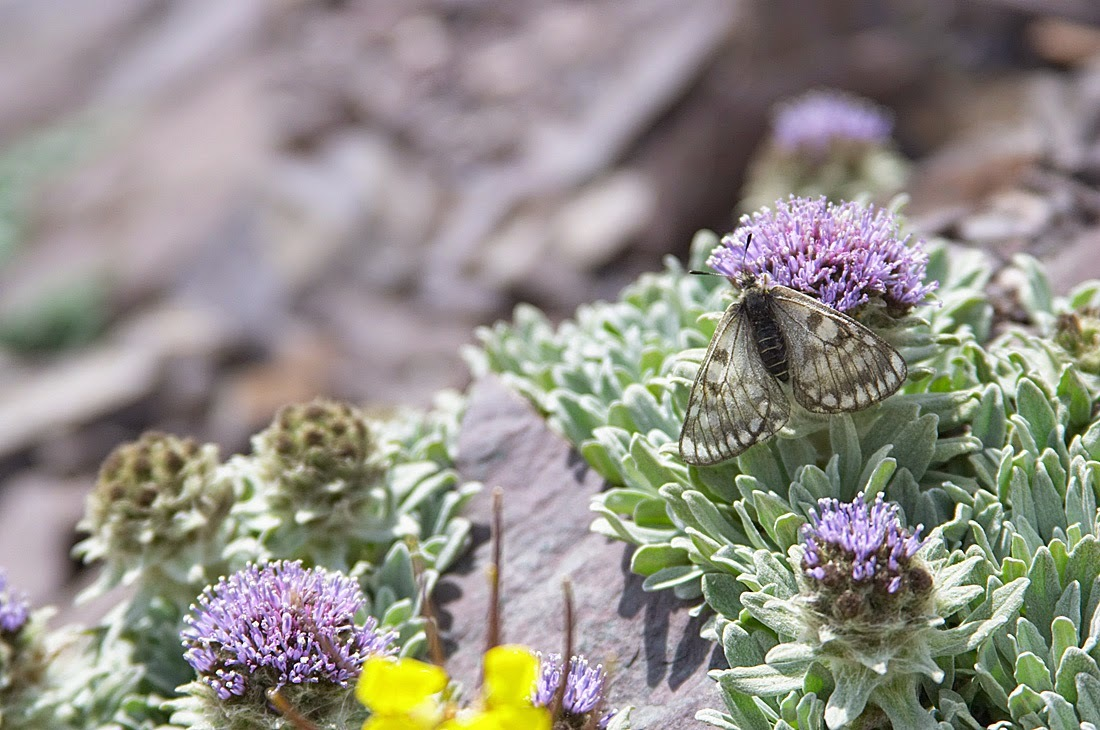
- Naryn Region, Kyrgyzstan, 2004

Scientific classification
- Domain: Eukaryota
- Kingdom: Animalia
- Phylum: Arthropoda
- Class: Insecta
- Order: Lepidoptera
- Family: Papilionidae
- Genus: Parnassius
- Species: P. boedromius

Binomial name
- Parnassius boedromius Püngeler, 1901

= Parnassius boedromius =

Species of butterfly

Parnassius boedromius is a high-altitude butterfly found in Asia. It has a restricted range, known only along the borders of Kyrgyzstan, Kazakhstan and Xinjiang, China. Formerly a subspecies of Parnassius simo. It is a member of the snow Apollo genus (Parnassius) of the swallowtail family (Papilionidae).

== Description ==
Note: The wing pattern in Parnassius species is inconsistent and the very many subspecies and forms make identification problematic and uncertain. Structural characters derived from the genitalia, wing venation, sphragis and foretibial epiphysis are more, but not entirely reliable. The description given here is a guide only. For an identification key see Ackery P.R. (1975).

Parnassius boedromius is distinguished by a reduction of the markings. On the forewing the discal band almost entirely absent, no red spots either above or below, ocelli vestigial.
