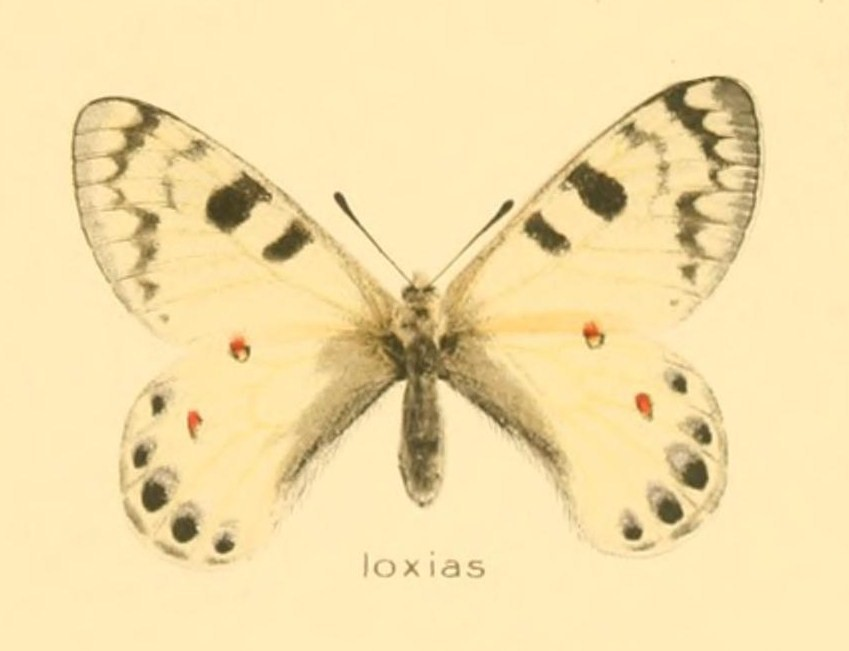

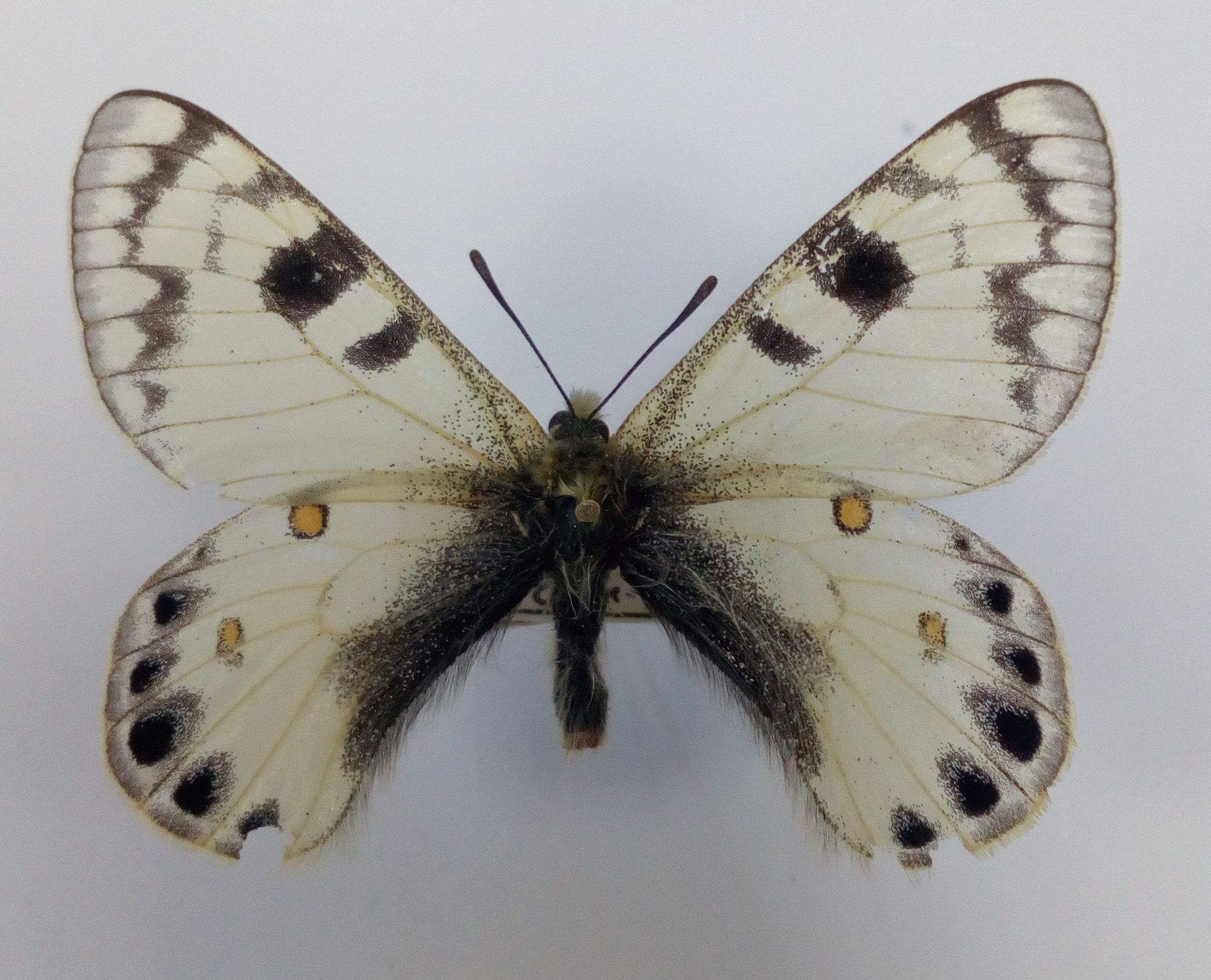

Scientific classification
- Domain: Eukaryota
- Kingdom: Animalia
- Phylum: Arthropoda
- Class: Insecta
- Order: Lepidoptera
- Family: Papilionidae
- Genus: Parnassius
- Species: P. loxias

Binomial name
- Parnassius loxias Püngeler, 1901

= Parnassius loxias =

Species of butterfly

Parnassius loxias is a high-altitude butterfly which is found in Kirghizia and west China. It is a member of the snow Apollo genus (Parnassius) of the swallowtail family (Papilionidae).
