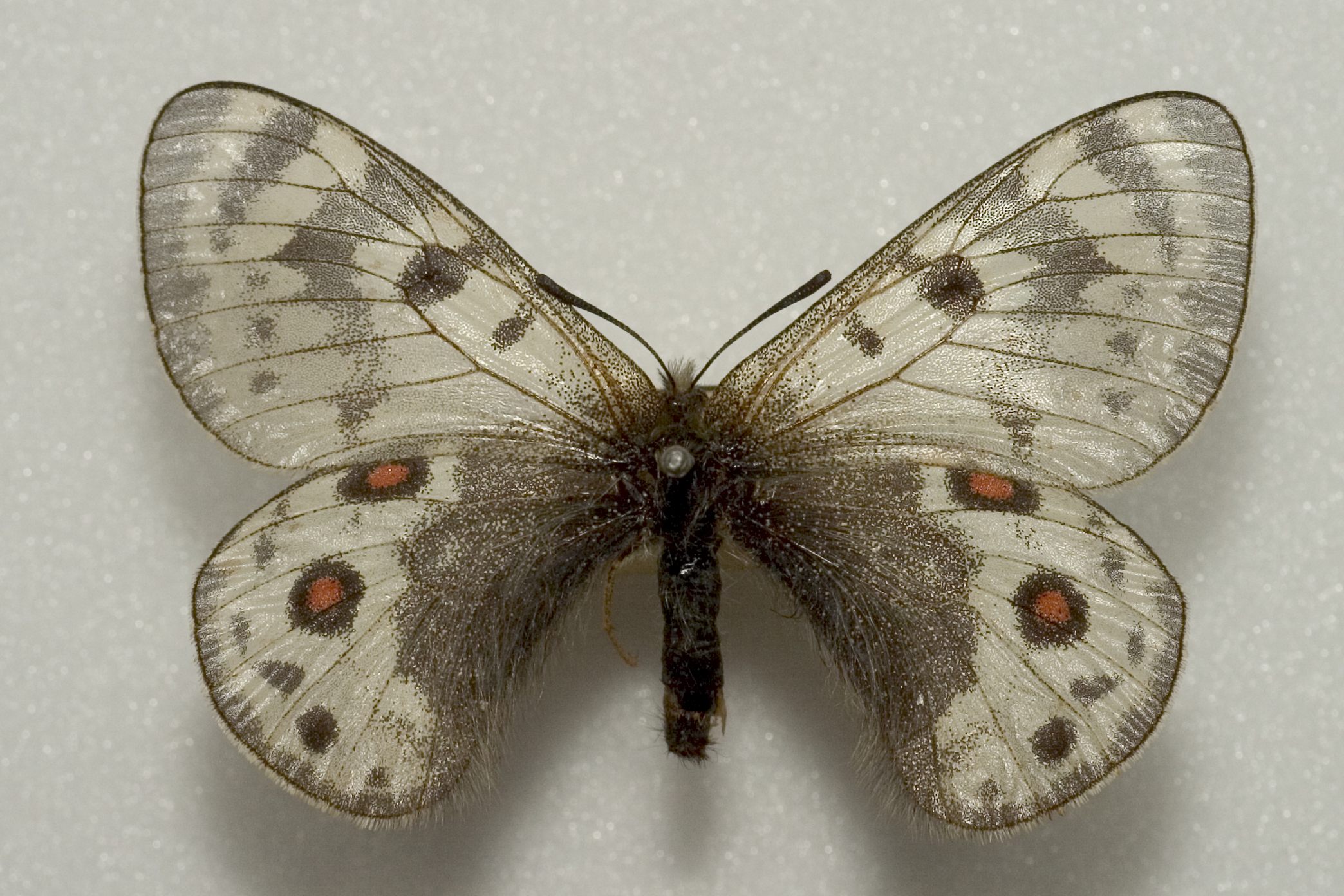
- Female from Lob Noor (Ulster Museum)

Conservation status
- Data Deficient (IUCN 3.1)

Scientific classification
- Kingdom: Animalia
- Phylum: Arthropoda
- Class: Insecta
- Order: Lepidoptera
- Family: Papilionidae
- Genus: Parnassius
- Species: P. acdestis

Binomial name
- Parnassius acdestis Grum-Grshimailo, 1891

= Parnassius acdestis =

Species of butterfly

Parnassius acdestis is a high-altitude butterfly found in India. It is a member of the genus Parnassius of the swallowtail family, Papilionidae. The species was first described by Grigory Grum-Grshimailo in 1891.

== Description ==
Note: The wing pattern in Parnassius species is inconsistent and the very many subspecies and forms make identification problematic and uncertain. Structural characters derived from the genitalia, wing venation, sphragis and foretibial epiphysis are more, but not entirely reliable. The description given here is a guide only. For an identification key see P.R. Ackery (1975).

Hindwing with very narrow marginal band, the submarginal spots isolated, small; the ultracellular costal spot of forewing continued by grey scaling, forming an s-shaped band.

=== Subspecies ===
- Parnassius acdestis cerevisiae Weiss & Michel
- Parnassius acdestis cinerosus Stichel
- Parnassius acdestis felix Eisner
- Parnassius acdestis hades (Bryk)
- Parnassius acdestis imperatoides Weiss & Michel
- Parnassius acdestis irenaephis Bryk
- Parnassius acdestis ladakensis Avinoff, 1916
- Parnassius acdestis lathonius Bryk
- Parnassius acdestis limitis Weiss & Michel
- Parnassius acdestis macdonardi Rothschild
- Parnassius acdestis manco Koiwaya
- Parnassius acdestis ohkuma Koiwaya
- Parnassius acdestis peeblesi Bryk
- Parnassius acdestis peshkei Eisner, 1933
- Parnassius acdestis rupshuana Avinoff, 1916
- Parnassius acdestis takedai Mikami & Sakakibara, 1988
- Parnassius acdestis vogti (Bang-Haas)
- Parnassius acdestis yanae Huang, 1998

== Range ==
Kirghistan, Nepal, northern India (Jammu & Kashmir, Sikkim), western China, Sinkiang and Szechwan.

== Status ==
Very local. Rather rare. Not known to be threatened.

== See also ==
- Papilionidae
- List of butterflies of India
- List of butterflies of India (Papilionidae)
