= Parnassius przewalskii =

Scientific classification
- Domain: Eukaryota
- Kingdom: Animalia
- Phylum: Arthropoda
- Class: Insecta
- Order: Lepidoptera
- Family: Papilionidae
- Genus: Parnassius
- Species: P. przewalskii

Binomial name
- Parnassius przewalskii (Alpheraky, 1887)

Species of butterfly

Parnassius przewalskii is a high-altitude butterfly which is found in Tibet and west China. It is a member of the snow Apollo genus (Parnassius) of the swallowtail family (Papilionidae).

The taxonomic status of this butterfly is uncertain. It was described as a species but some authors regard P. przewalskii as a subspecies of P. acco.

== Description ==
Specifically distinct on account of the different structure of the pouch of the female. Smaller than a typical specimen of hardwickei, with only slight differences in the forewing, marginal band narrow, ending in an acute point at hinder angle, the submarginal band appearing as far as hindmargin as a narrow tapering stripe shaded with black, the band broken step-like at 3. Subcostal, in the male strongly incurved in middle, in female on the whole broader and more even. Beyond the cell two costal spots, centred with deep red like the hindmarginal spot, on the disc blackish shading. Hindwing with large red basal spot, two large broadly red ocelli, between which there is a black diffuse streak, there being another small black spot between the anterior ocellus and the basal spot; the blackish posterior area projecting tooth-like at apex of cell, sometimes (in female) the cell completely encircled; from the posterior ocellus extends forward and backward a curved band of black spots; close to the margin four black spots filled in with blue, the anterior one sometimes plain black. Underside like upper, but paler, the anal spots filled in with pale red, the ground of wings brownish. Pouch of female whitish, encircling the last abdominal segment as a broad half ring, that bladder-shaped, posteriorly acuminate.

The species is named for Nikolai Przhevalsky.
