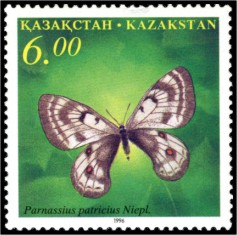
- On a stamp of Kazakhstan
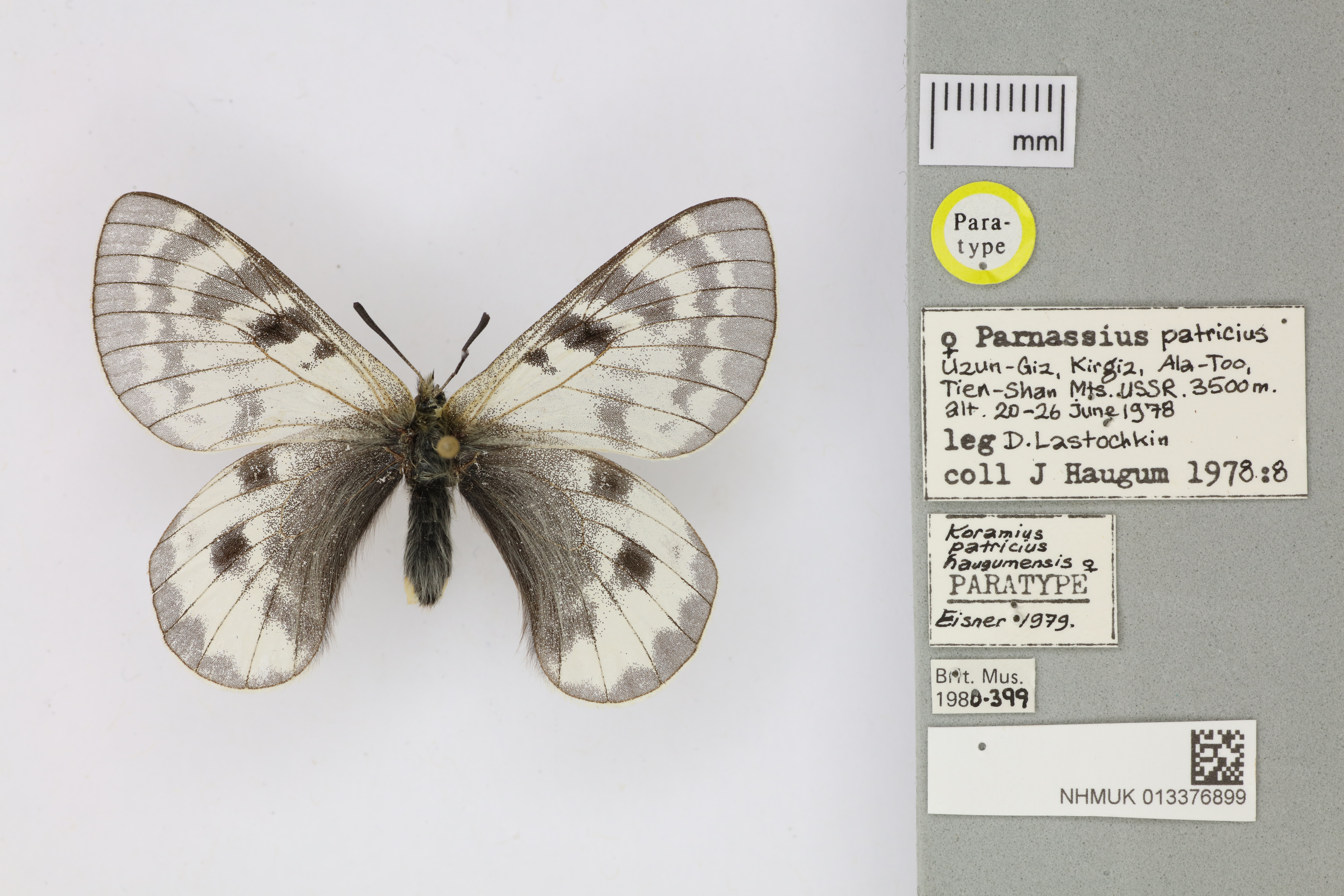
- P. patricius haugumensis Eisner, 1979 Paratype

Scientific classification
- Domain: Eukaryota
- Kingdom: Animalia
- Phylum: Arthropoda
- Class: Insecta
- Order: Lepidoptera
- Family: Papilionidae
- Genus: Parnassius
- Species: P. patricius

Binomial name
- Parnassius patricius Niepelt, 1850

= Parnassius patricius =

Species of butterfly

Parnassius patricius is a high altitude butterfly that is found in Kyrgyzstan and Turkmenistan (Turkestan in older literature). It is a member of the snow Apollo genus (Parnassius) of the swallowtail family, Papilionidae. The larva feeds on Cysticorydalis fedtschenkoana.

== Description ==
Similar to Parnassius delphius but the submarginal spots of the hindwing upperside, when present, are paler and not centred with blue. The forewing spots usually have a less well-developed pigmentation and the sphragis is smaller than in P. delphius.

=== Subspecies ===
- Parnassius patricius kardakoffi Bryk & Eisner, 1930
- Parnassius patricius luedwigi Kreuzberg, 1989
- Parnassius patricius lukhtanovi Rose, 1992
- Parnassius patricius priamus Bryk, 1914
- Parnassius patricius uzungyrus D. Weiss, 1979
