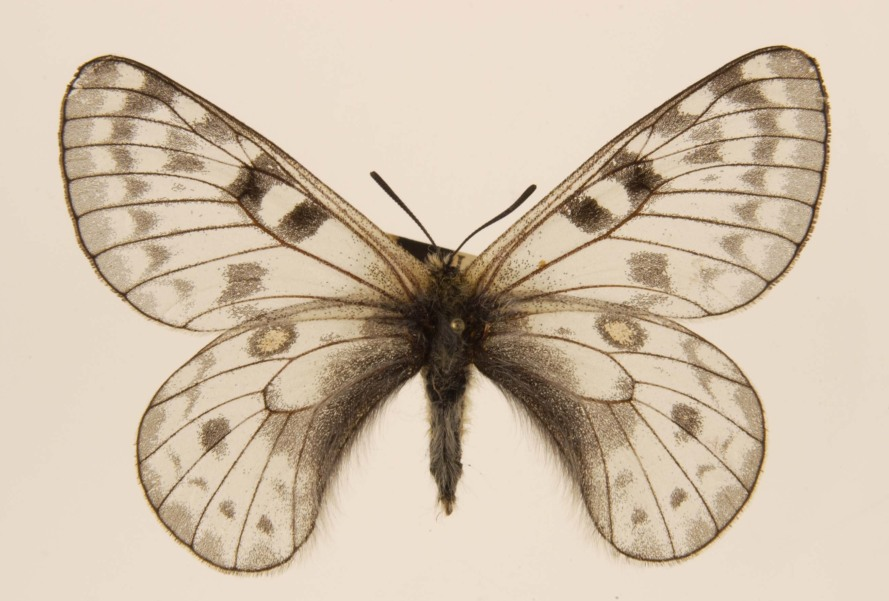
- A male from Taglang Pass, Ladakh, in the Ulster Museum

Scientific classification
- Kingdom: Animalia
- Phylum: Arthropoda
- Class: Insecta
- Order: Lepidoptera
- Family: Papilionidae
- Genus: Parnassius
- Species: P. maharaja

Binomial name
- Parnassius maharaja Avinoff, 1916

= Parnassius maharaja =

Maharaja Apollo

Species of butterfly

Parnassius maharaja, the maharaja Apollo, is a high-altitude butterfly which is found in India and west China. It is a member of the snow Apollo genus (Parnassius) of the swallowtail family (Papilionidae).

== Range ==
North-western India, west China

== Status ==
Local. Not known to be threatened.

== See also ==
- Papilionidae
- List of butterflies of India
- List of butterflies of India (Papilionidae)
