= List of butterflies of China (Papilionidae) =

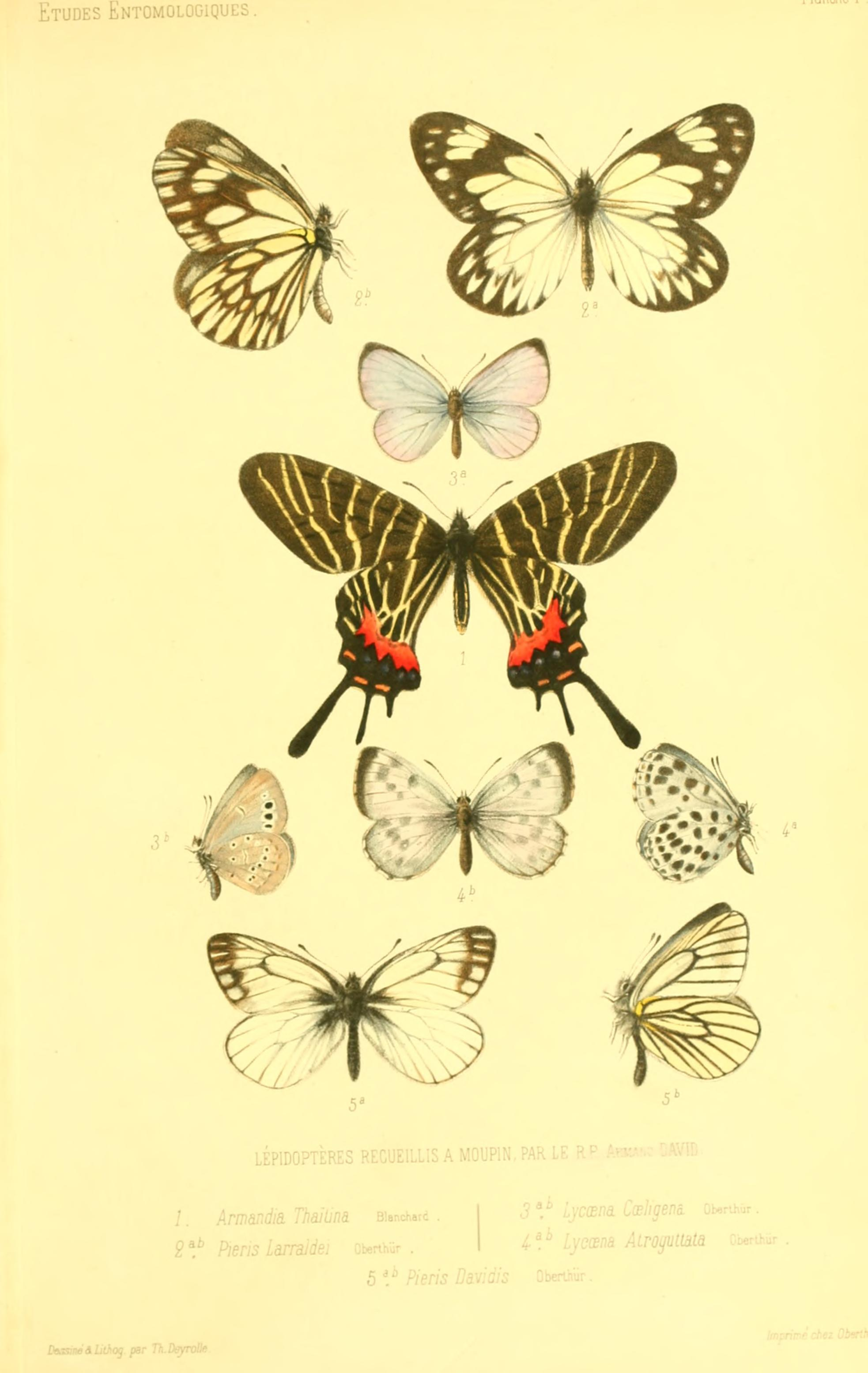
Bhutanitis thaidina in Charles Oberthür's Études d'entomologie: Lépidoptères de Chine (1876)

This is a list of the butterflies of China belonging to the family Papilionidae and an index to the species articles. This forms part of the full list of butterflies of China. 371 species or subspecies of Papilionidae are recorded from China.

== Papilionidae ==
genus: Atrophaneura

- Atrophaneura latreillei (Donovan, 1826)

A. l. genestieri (Oberthür, 1918) Yunnan

- Atrophaneura polyeuctes (Doubleday, 1842)

A. p. lama (Oberthür, 1876) West China

- Atrophaneura dasarada (Moore, 1857)

A. d. ouvrardi Oberthür, 1920 Tibet, Yunnan
A. d. melanura (Rothschild, 1905) Hainan

- Atrophaneura nevilli (Wood-Mason, 1882) West China
- Atrophaneura alcinous (Klug, 1836)

A. a. mansonensis (Fruhstorfer, 1901) South China

- Atrophaneura daemonius (Alphéraky, 1895) West China, Tibet

A. d. yunnana (Oberthür, 1907) Yunnan

- Atrophaneura plutonius (Oberthür, 1876) West China
- Atrophaneura mencius (C. & R. Felder, 1862) Central China, Southeast China
- Atrophaneura rhadinus (Jordan, 1928) Yunnan
- Atrophaneura zaleucus (Hewitson, 1865) Yunnan
- Atrophaneura aidoneus (Doubleday, 1845) Yunnan
- Atrophaneura coon (Fabricius, 1793)

A. c. insperatus (Joicey & Talbot, 1921) Hainan

genus: Bhutanitis

- Bhutanitis lidderdalii Atkinson, 1873

B. l. spinosa Bauer & Frankenbach, 1998 Northwest Yunnan, Southwest China

- Bhutanitis thaidina (Blanchard, 1871)

B. t. thaidina (Blanchard, 1871) China, Tibet
B. t. dongchuanensis Lee

- Bhutanitis yulongensis Chou
- Bhutanitis nigrilima Chou
- Bhutanitis mansfieldi (Riley, 1939)

B. m. pulchristriata Saigusa & Lee, 1982 Sichuan

genus: Graphium

- Graphium cloanthus (Westwood, 1841)

G. c. clymenus (Leech, 1893) South China West China

- Graphium sarpedon (Linnaeus, 1758)

G. s. sarpedon (Linnaeus, 1758) China, Hainan, Yunnan

- Graphium eurypylus (Linnaeus, 1758)

G. e. cheronus (Jordan, 1909) South China, Yunnan, Hainan

- Graphium chironides (Honrath, 1884)

G. c. chironides (Honrath, 1884) Yunnan

- Graphium doson (C. & R. Felder, 1864)

G. d. axion (C. & R. Felder, 1864) China, Hainan

- Graphium bathycles (Zinken, 1831)
- Graphium leechi (Rothschild, 1895)
- Graphium agamemnon (Linnaeus, 1758)

G. a. agamemnon (Linnaeus, 1758) Yunnan

- Graphium antiphates (Cramer, [1775])

G. a. antiphates (Cramer, [1775]) Southeast China
G. a. pompilius (Fabricius, 1787) Hainan, Yunnan

- Graphium nomius (Esper, 1799)

G. n. hainana (Chou, 1994) Hainan

- Graphium agetes (Westwood, 1843)

G. a. chinensis (Chou & Li, 1994) Yunnan

- Graphium xenocles (Doubleday, 1842)

G. x. xenoclides (Fruhstorfer, 1902) Hainan

- Graphium eurous (Leech, [1893])

G. e. panopaea (de Nicéville, 1900) West China

- Graphium mandarinus (Oberthür, 1879)
- Graphium alebion (Gray, [1853])
- Graphium tamerlana (Oberthür, 1876)

G. t. taliensis (O. Bang-Haas, 1927)

- Graphium hoenei (Mell, 1935) Guangdong, Fujian, Zhejiang, Shaanxi, Sichuan
- Graphium glycerion (Gray, 1831)

genus: Luehdorfia

- Luehdorfia chinensis Leech, 1893
- Luehdorfia japonica Leech, 1889
- Luehdorfia puziloi (Erschoff, 1872)

L. p. lenzeni Bryk, 1938 China
L. p. lingjangensis Lee, 1982 China

genus: Papilio

- Papilio machaon Linnaeus, 1758

P. m. sikkimensis Moore, 1884 Tibet
P. m. centralis Staudinger, 1886 Tian Shan
P. m. montanus Alphéraky, 1897 Sichuan, Gansu, Qinghai, Yunnan
P. m. verityi Fruhstorfer, 1907 Yunnan
P. m. orientis Verity, 1911 Amur
P. m. oreinus Sheljuzhko, 1919 Tian Shan
P. m. taliensis Eller, 1939 Yunnan
P. m. kiyonobu Morita, 1997 Tibet
P. m. baijianensis Huang & Murayama, 1992 Tian Shan

- Papilio alexanor Esper, 1800

P. a. voldemar Kreuzberg, 1989 Tian Shan

- Papilio xuthus Linnaeus, 1767 Yunnan
- Papilio polytes Linnaeus, 1758

P. p. polytes China
P. p. mandane Rothschild, 1895 West China
P. p. liujidongi Huang, 2003 Yunnan

- Papilio castor Westwood, 1842

P. c. hamela Crowley, 1900 Hainan

- Papilio mahadeva Moore, [1879]

P. m. choui Li, 1994 Guangxi

- Papilio helenus Linnaeus, 1758

P. h. helenus Linnaeus, 1758 China

- Papilio nephelus Boisduval, 1836

P. n. chaon Westwood, 1845 Yunnan
P. n. chaonulus Fruhstorfer, 1902 South China, Hainan

- Papilio memnon Linnaeus, 1758

P. m. agenor Linnaeus, 1768 Yunnan

- Papilio protenor Cramer, [1775]

P. p. euprotenor Fruhstorfer, 1908 South China

- Papilio alcmenor C. & R. Felder, [1864]

P. a. irene Joicey & Talbot, 1921 Hainan

- Papilio macilentus Janson, 1877 East China
- Papilio bootes Westwood, 1842

P. b. nigricans Rothschild, 1895 West China
P. b. dealbatus Rothschild, 1895 West China
P. b. parcesquamata Rosen, 1929 Yunnan

- Papilio elwesi Leech, 1889
- Papilio agestor Gray, 1831

P. a. restricta Leech, 1893 South China
P. a. kuangtungensis Mell, 1935 Guangxi, Guandong, Fujian, Zhejiang

- Papilio epycides Hewitson, 1864

P. e. horatius Blanchard, 1871 Sichuan
P. e. hypochra Jordan, 1909 South Yunnan
P. e. yamabuki (Yoshino, 2008) North Yunnan

- Papilio slateri Hewitson, 1859

P. s. hainanensis (Chou, 1994) Hainan

- Papilio clytia Linnaeus, 1758

P. c. panope Linnaeus, 1758 Hainan

- Papilio paradoxa (Zinken, 1831)

P. p. telearchus (Hewitson, 1852) Yunnan

- Papilio paris Linnaeus, 1758

P. p. paris Linnaeus, 1758 Southwest China

- Papilio bianor Cramer, 1777

P. b. bianor Cramer, 1777 South China
P. b. ganesa Doubleday, 1842 Yunnan

- Papilio maackii Menetries, 1859

P. m. han (Yoshino, 1997) Fujian, Zhejiang, Sichuan

- Papilio dialis Leech, 1893 West China
- Papilio krishna Moore, 1857

P. k. charlesi Fruhstorfer, 1902 West China

- Papilio arcturus Westwood, 1842 West China

P. a. arcturulus Fruhstorfer, 1902 Sichuan

- Papilio polyctor Boisduval, 1836

P. p. xiei Chou, 1994 Yunnan

- Papilio syfanius Oberthür, 1886

P. s. syfanius North Yunnan
P. s. albosyfanius Shimogori & Fujioka, 1997 North Yunnan
P. s. kongaensis (Yoshino, 1997) Sichuan

genus: Parnassius

For a fuller list of subspecies in this genus see

- Parnassius apollo (Linnaeus, 1758)

P. a. merzbacheri Fruhstorfer, 1906 Tian Shan

- Parnassius nomion Fischer de Waldheim, 1823

P. n. liupinschani Bang-Haas, 1934 Shaanxi
P. n. epaphoides Bryk & Eisner, 1937 Gansu
P. n. badius Bang-Haas, 1938 Gansu

- Parnassius phoebus (Fabricius, 1793)

P. p. halasicus Huang & Murayama, 1992

- Parnassius actius (Eversmann, 1843)

P. a. minutus Verity, 1911 Tian Shan
P. a. ambrosius Stichel, 1907 Tian Shan
P. a. dubitabilis Verity, 1911 Tian Shan
P. a. actinoboloides Bang-Haas, 1928 Gansu

- Parnassius jacquemonti Boisduval, 1836

P. j. variabilis Stichel, 1906 Tian Shan
P. j. tibetanus Ruhl, 1892 Tibet

- Parnassius tianschianicus Oberthür, 1879

P. t. chimganus Kreuzberg, 1989 Tian Shan
P. t. astrictio Ohya, 1987 Tian Shan
P. t. thiseus Ehrmann, 1920 Tian Shan

- Parnassius epaphus Oberthür, 1879

P. e. poeta Oberthür, 1892
P. e. nanchaninca Austaut, 1899 Nanchan
P. e. phariensis Avinoff, 1916 Tibet
P. e. dongalaica Tytler, 1926 Tibet
P. e. subtilis Bang-Haas, 1927

- Parnassius bremeri Bremer, 1864 Heilongjiang, Shanxi, Hebei
- Parnassius apollonius (Eversmann, 1847)

P. a. gloriosus Fruhstorfer, 1904 Tian Shan
P. a. narynus Fruhstorfer, 1908 Tian Shan
P. a. poseidon Bryk & Eisner, 1934 Tian Shan

- Parnassius mnemosyne (Linnaeus, 1758) Tian Shan
- Parnassius stubbendorfi Ménétriés, 1849

P. s. bodemeyeri Bryk, 1914 Amur
P. s. bronkampi Bang-Haas, 1933 Gansu

- Parnassius glacialis Butler, 1866

P. g. nankingi Bang-Haas, 1927 Nanjing
P. g. sinicus Bryk, 1932 Chang-Jong
P. g. tajanus Bryk, 1932
P. g. anachoreta Bryk, 1936

- Parnassius felderi Bremer, 1861
- Parnassius ariadne (Lederer, 1853)

P. a. jiadengyuensis Huang & Murayama, 1992 Xinjiang (Altai)

- Parnassius orleans Oberthür, 1890

P. o. johanna Bryk, 1932 Shaanxi
P. o. parthenos Bryk, 1932 Sichuan
P. o. lobnorica Bryk, 1934 Lob Nor
P. o. janseni Bang-Haas, 1938 Minshan
P. o. schneideri Bang-Haas, 1938 Gansu
P. o. lakshmi Mikami, 1998

- Parnassius acco Gray, [1853]

P. a. tagalangi Bang-Haas, 1927 Tibet
P. a. liliput (Bryk, 1932) Tibet
P. a. gyanglaputsai Huang, 1998 Tibet

- Parnassius hannyngtoni Avinoff, 1916 South Tibet
- Parnassius przewalskii Alphéraky, 1887
- Parnassius baileyi South, 1913

P. p. liae Huang & Murayama, 1989 West China
P. b. baileyanus (Bryk, 1932) West China
P. b. rothschildianus Bryk, 1931 Sichuan

- Parnassius labeyriei Weiss & Michel Qinghai
- Parnassius schultei Weiss & Michel, 1989 Tibet
- Parnassius szechenyii Frivaldszky, 1886

P. s. germanae Austaut, 1906 Kangding
P. s. lethe Bryk & Eisner
P. s. frivaldszkyi Bang-Haas, 1928 Gansu
P. s. kansuensis Bryk & Eisner, 1931 Gansu
P. s. arnoldiana (Bang-Haas, 1938) Minshan
P. s. luminosa (Bang-Haas, 1938) Qilian Shan

- Parnassius cephalus Grum-Grshimailo, 1891

P. c. elwesi Leech, 1893 Tibet
P. c. rileyanus (Bryk, 1932) Tibet
P. c. irene Bryk & Eisner Qinghai
P. c. eierhoffi (Bang-Haas, 1938) Gansu
P. c. sengei (Bang-Haas, 1938) Minshan
P. c. paimaensis Yoshino, 1997 Yunnan

- Parnassius choui Huang & Shi, 1994
- Parnassius delphius Eversmann, 1843
- Parnassius hide Koiwaya, 1987
- Parnassius acdestis Grum-Grshimailo, 1891

P. a. hades (Bryk, 1932) Tibet
P. a. lathonius Bryk Tibet
P. a. lux (Eisner, 1969) Tibet
P. a. yanae Huang, 1998 Xiagangjiang Mountains

- Parnassius tenedius Eversmann, 1851
- Parnassius simo Gray, [1853]

P. s. hingstoni (Bryk, 1932) Tibet
P. s. bainqenerdini Huang, 1998 Xiagangjiang Mountains

- Parnassius andreji Eisner, 1930

P. a. eos Bryk & Eisner, 1934 Gansu
P. a. buddenbrocki (Bang-Haas, 1938) Minshan
P. a. dirschi Bang-Haas, 1938 Gansu

- Parnassius charltonius Gray, [1853]

P. c. basharianus (Eisner, 1969) Tibet

- Parnassius loxias Püngeler, 1901
- Parnassius imperator Oberthür, 1883

P. i. augustus Fruhstorfer, 1903 Nan Shan
P. i. intermedius Rothschild, 1909 Tibet
P. i. irmae (Bryk, 1932) Tibet
P. i. aino (Bryk, 1932) Yunnan
P. i. evansi (Bryk, 1932) Tibet
P. i. regulus Bryk & Eisner, 1932 Nan Shan
P. i. regina Bryk & Eisner, 1932 Minshan
P. i. dominus Bang-Haas, 1934 Qinghai
P. i. uxoria Bang-Haas, 1935 Qinghai

genus: Sericinus

- Sericinus montela Gray, 1852

genus: Teinopalpus

- Teinopalpus aureus Mell, 1923

T. a. wuyiensis Lee, 1992
T. a. guangxiensis Chou & Zhou, 1994 Guangxi, Mt. Dayaoshan
T. a. hainanensis Lee Hainan

- Teinopalpus imperialis Hope, 1843

T. i. imperialis Hope, 1843
T. i. behludinii Pen, 1936 Sichuan
