= Parnassius arcticus =

Siberian Apollo

Scientific classification
- Domain: Eukaryota
- Kingdom: Animalia
- Phylum: Arthropoda
- Class: Insecta
- Order: Lepidoptera
- Family: Papilionidae
- Genus: Parnassius
- Species: P. arcticus

Binomial name
- Parnassius arcticus Eisner, 1968

Species of butterfly

Parnassius arcticus, the Siberian Apollo, is a high-altitude butterfly which is found in Northeastern Yakutia, Russia. It is a member of the snow Apollo genus (Parnassius) of the swallowtail family, Papilionidae.

The taxonomic status of this butterfly is uncertain. It was originally described from females only as a Siberian subspecies of Parnassius simo, a species which does not occur in Siberia. Eisner, the author of the subspecies later decided it was conspecific with Parnassius tenedius. Korshunov & Gorbunov (1995) regard it as a good (full) species with ammosovi Korshunov as a junior synonym.

P. ammasovi lives on scree at 1,500 m. The adult flies mid-June to early July. Eggs are laid on stones around the host plant, Corydalis gorodkovi.
