= Parnassius andreji =

Scientific classification
- Kingdom: Animalia
- Phylum: Arthropoda
- Class: Insecta
- Order: Lepidoptera
- Family: Papilionidae
- Genus: Parnassius
- Species: P. andreji

Binomial name
- Parnassius andreji Eisner, 1930

Species of butterfly

Parnassius andreji is a snow butterfly found in China. The species was first described by Curt Eisner in 1930.

Parnassius andreji was described as a subspecies of Parnassius simo. It is now treated as a full species occurring sympatrically with Parnassius simo.
