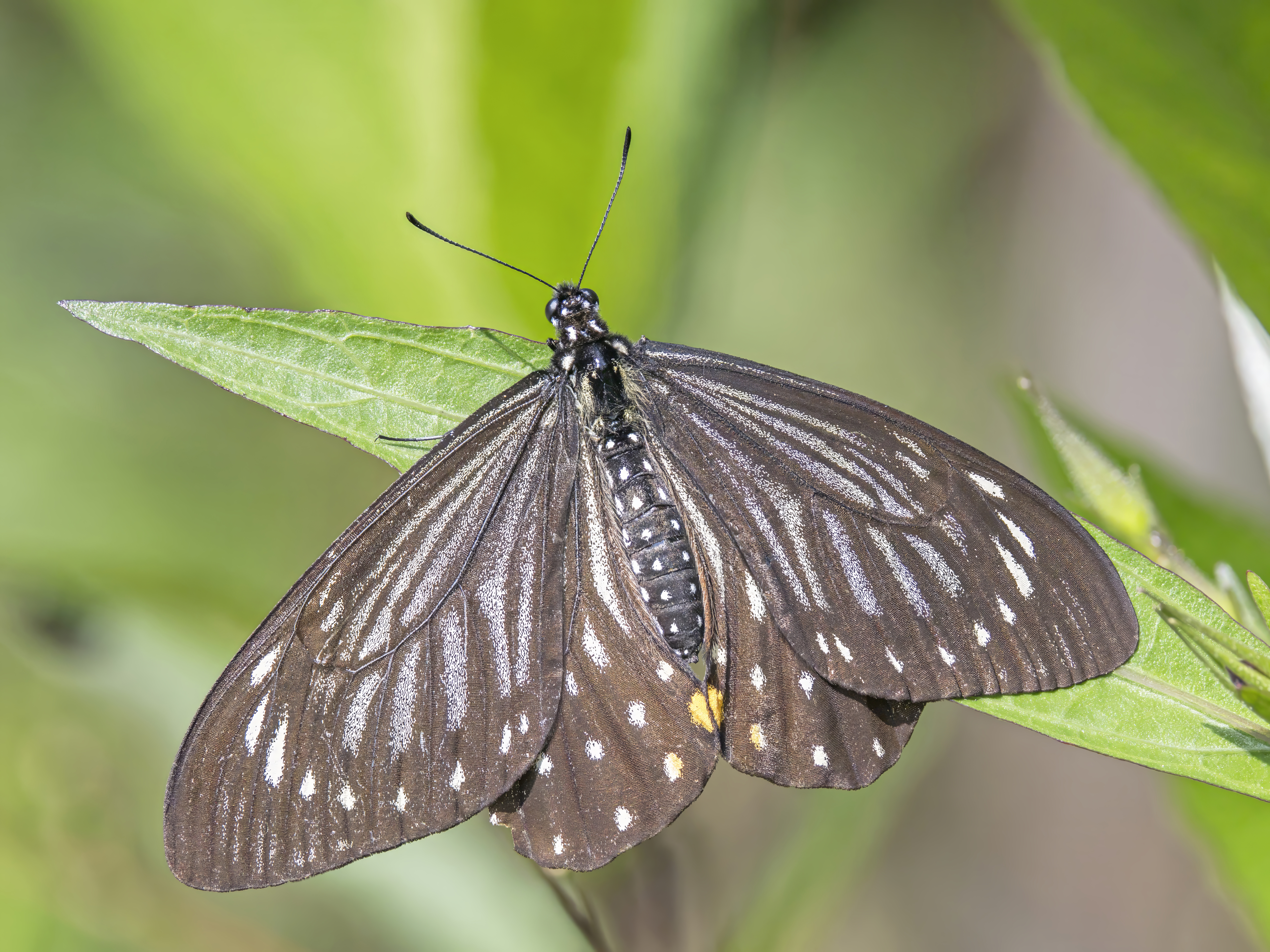
- P. e. melanoleucos, Taiwan
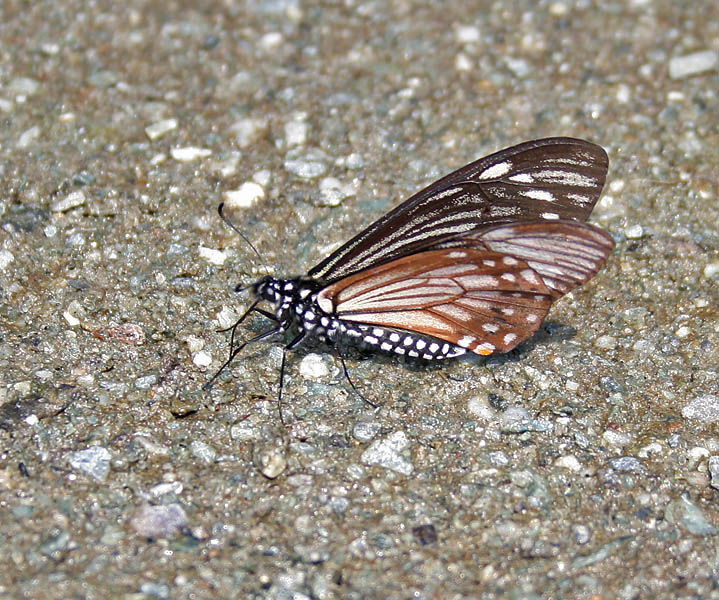
- Darjeeling district, West Bengal, India

Scientific classification
- Kingdom: Animalia
- Phylum: Arthropoda
- Class: Insecta
- Order: Lepidoptera
- Family: Papilionidae
- Genus: Papilio
- Species: P. epycides

Binomial name
- Papilio epycides Hewitson, 1862

Synonyms
- Chilasa epycides

= Papilio epycides =

Species of butterfly

Papilio (Chilasa) epycides, the lesser mime, is a swallowtail butterfly found in India and parts of South-East Asia. The butterfly belongs to the mime (Chilasa) subgenus or the black-bodied swallowtails. It is a mimic of a common Indian Danainae, the glassy tiger butterfly.

== Description ==
The male upperside is dull black, with the following somewhat dingy white markings that resemble in their disposition the markings of Papilio agestor. Forewing: cell with two streaks from base that diverge outward and reach the apex, three shorter streaks between and above them at apex; interspace 1a with an elongate streak that does not reach the termen; two streaks in interspace 1 divided by a black line as in P. agestor; a series of more or less rectangular broad streaks in interspaces 2 to 6 with elongate spots in 7 and 8; a very slender costal streak from base; finally a series of subterminal spots in interspaces 1 to 5 succeeded above in interspaces 6 and 7 by ill-defined subterminal streaks. Hindwing: cell white traversed longitudinally by two short black lines, the upper one forked near apex; a discal series of broad white streaks from the dorsal margin in the interspaces 1 to 7, the streaks in interspace 2 to 6 short and more or less rectangular; transverse series of postdiscal and subterminal white spots beyond, the postdiscal spots in interspaces 6 and 7 coalescent with the discal streaks in those interspaces; finally, a tornal prominent ochraceous-yellow spot.

Underside similar, the ground colour outwardly on the forewing and over the whole of the hindwing more or less of a chestnut tint; markings similar to those on the upperside but broader and on the forewing diffuse towards the apex; on the hindwing the discal streak in interspace 7 is absent and there is an edging of white anteriorly in the yellow spot at the tornal angle. Antennae, head, thorax and abdomen black; the head and thorax spotted with white; the abdomen with three rows of white spots along the sides.

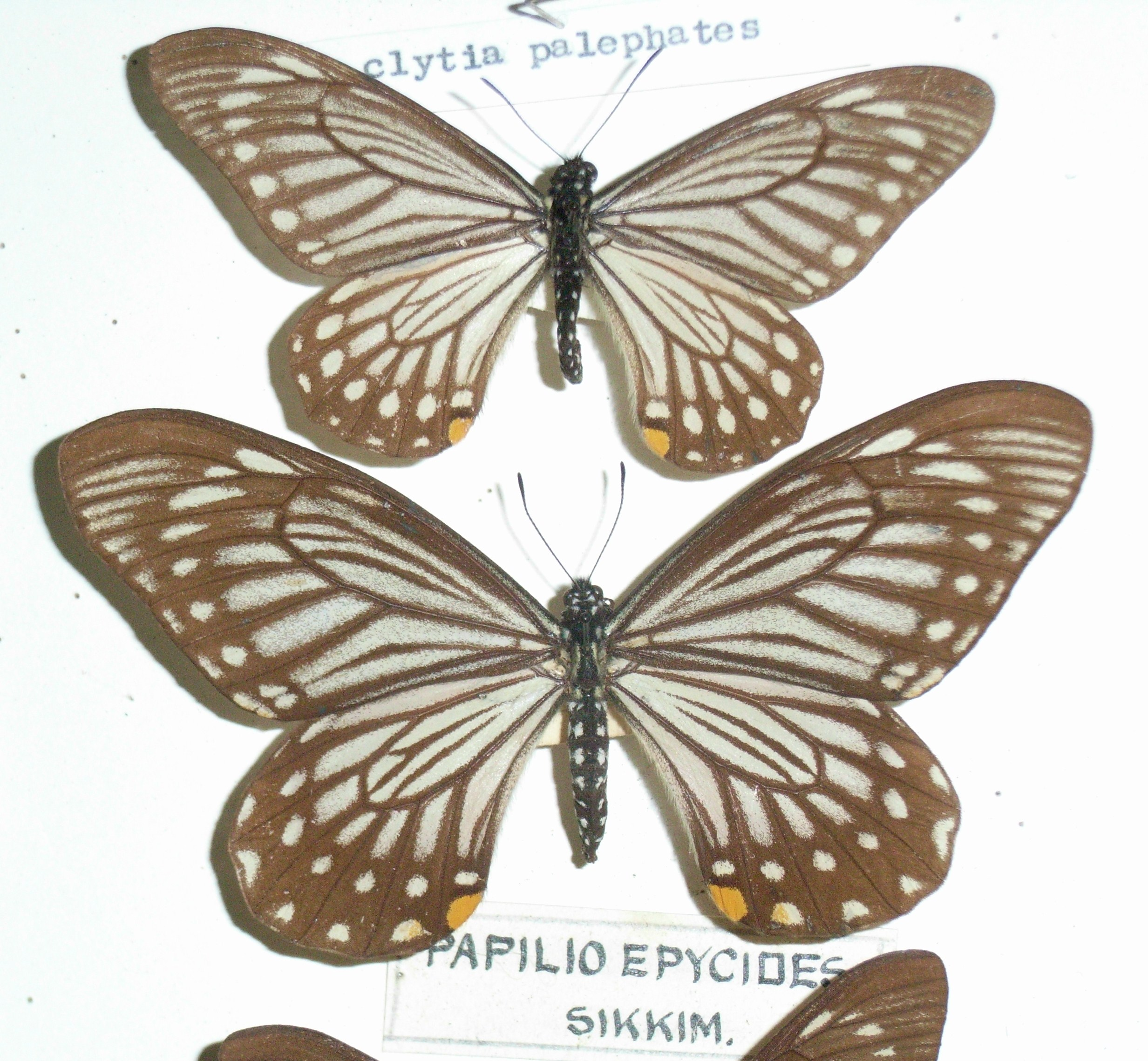
Papilio epycides Sikkim, 1884

Female has markings larger than the male and mostly of a much paler colour; the submarginal spots of the hindwing are especially enlarged. The forewings have often some minute linear spots between the outer margin and the submarginal series of rounded markings in both sexes. The yellow anal spot is slightly variable in size. (Rothschild quoted in Bingham.)

== Distribution ==
The butterfly is found in India from Nepal to north Myanmar right across Sikkim, Bhutan, Assam and Arunachal Pradesh. It is also found in Thailand, Vietnam, Laos, Kampuchea, peninsular Malaysia and southern China (including Taiwan).

== Status ==
It is not considered rare in India where the nominate subspecies is protected by law. There are no known threats to the species.

== Habitat ==
This butterfly flies from low elevations to 4,000 feet (1,200 m) in March and April.

== Mimicry ==
The lesser mime resembles the glassy tiger (Parantica aglea) but can be easily distinguished by the markings which are not glassy.

== Habits ==
The flight of the mime mimics that of the species it resembles.

== Life cycle ==
It is a single brooded butterfly that occurs in the spring.

== Larval food plants ==
- Cinnamomum camphora
- Persea thunbergi

== See also ==
- Papilionidae
- List of butterflies of India (Papilionidae)

== Other reading ==
- Evans, W.H. (1932). The Identification of Indian Butterflies (2nd ed.). Mumbai, India: Bombay Natural History Society.
- Haribal, Meena (1992). The Butterflies of Sikkim Himalaya and Their Natural History. Gangtok, Sikkim, India: Sikkim Nature Conservation Foundation.
- Wynter-Blyth, Mark Alexander (1957). Butterflies of the Indian Region. Bombay, India: Bombay Natural History Society. ISBN 978-8170192329.
