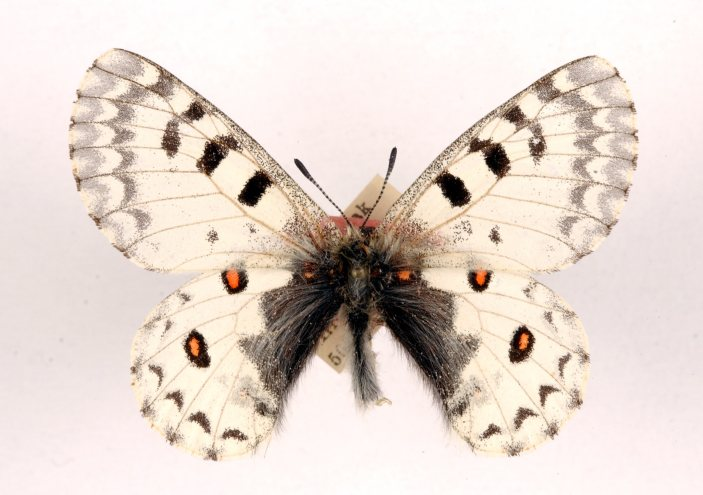
- A syntype specimen from the Ulster Museum
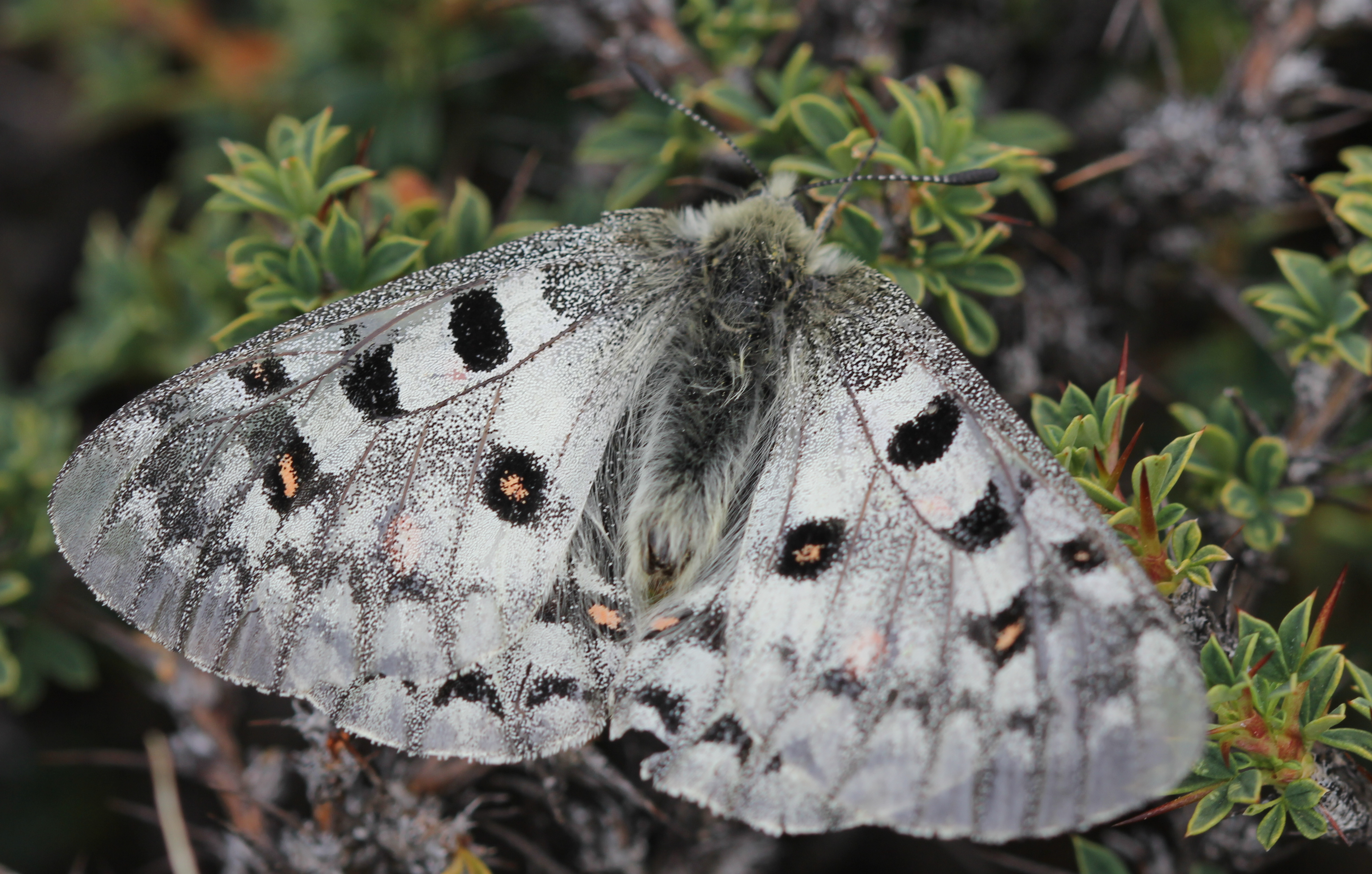

Scientific classification
- Kingdom: Animalia
- Phylum: Arthropoda
- Class: Insecta
- Order: Lepidoptera
- Family: Papilionidae
- Genus: Parnassius
- Species: P. epaphus

Binomial name
- Parnassius epaphus Oberthür, 1879

= Parnassius epaphus =

Common red Apollo

Species of butterfly

Parnassius epaphus, the common red Apollo, is a high altitude butterfly which is found in India and Nepal. It is a member of the snow Apollo genus (Parnassius) of the swallowtail family (Papilionidae). It is found from 9,000 to 13,000 feet (2,700 to 4,000 m) from Chitral District to Sikkim and western regions of Nepal. It is not considered rare.

== Description ==
Superficially this form closely resembles Parnassius jacquemontii, but besides the structural differences of the anal pouch in the fertilized female, in markings it differs as follows:

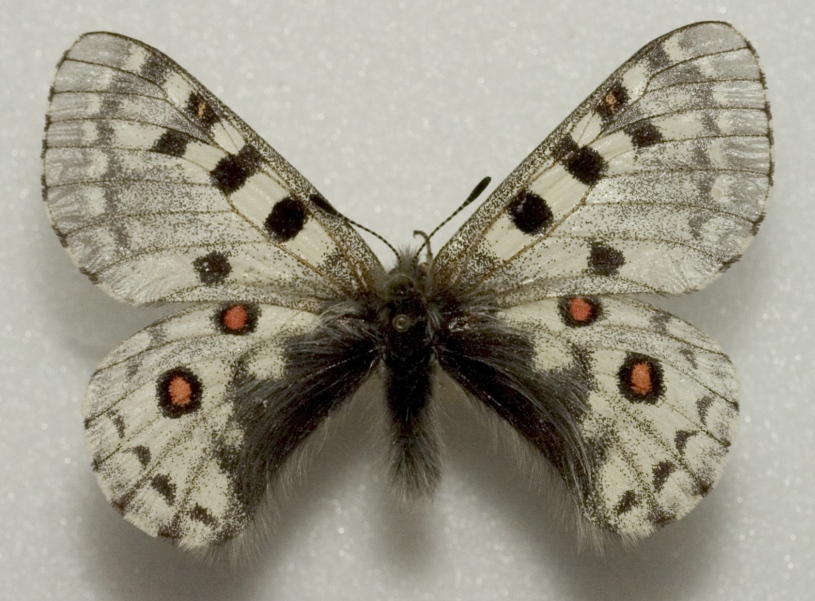
Race abruptus specimen from Kansu in the Ulster Museum

Male: Upperside, forewing: the crimson black-encircled spots reduced to a minute subcostal dot in the black mark beyond the cell; the subhyaline (almost glass-like) terminal margin much narrower, with dentate (tooth-like) white spots in the interspaces along the actual margin; cilia white, markedly alternated with black at the apices of the veins. Hindwing: the dusky black along the dorsal margin comparatively much broader, its inner border more irregular, deeply bi-emarginate, the crimson centre to the black mark above the tornal angle entirely absent. In no specimens observed are the crimson spots centred with white. Underside: with the same glazed appearance as in jacquemontii; markings as on the upperside, but on the forewing the white dentate spots in the terminal row are larger, which give to the wing the appearance of having a subterminal as well as a post-discal transverse series of dusky-black lunules. On the hindwing the row of basal and the obliquely-placed pre-tornal spots are as in jacquemontii but of a duller shade, while as in that form all the crimson spots are broadly centred with white. Antennae differ from those of jacquemonti as they are conspicuously ringed with white. Female differs from the male in the dusky black markings on the upperside that are broader, especially the postdiscal series on the forewing: this generally forms a diffuse band and so often restricts the lunules of the white ground colour beyond it, blending as it does diffusely with the subhyaline terminal margin. Anal pouch of fertilized female differs conspicuously from that of jacquemontii female in the complete absence of the posterior high keel or carina.

== Range ==
Afghanistan, Pakistan, Tajikistan, northern India (Himalayas and Sikkim), Nepal, Bhutan and China (Tibet, Xinjiang, Gansu, Qinghai and Sichuan). Fairly broadly distributed.

== Status ==
It is broadly distributed across Asia and not known to be threatened. The subspecies P. e. hillensis is protected by law in India.

== See also ==
- Papilionidae
- List of butterflies of India
- List of butterflies of India (Papilionidae)

== Other references ==
- Evans, W.H. (1932). The Identification of Indian Butterflies (2nd ed.). Mumbai, India: Bombay Natural History Society.
- Sakai S., Inaoka S., Toshiaki A., Yamaguchi S., Watanabe Y., (2002) The Parnassiology. The Parnassius Butterflies, A Study in Evolution, Kodansha, Japan.
- Weiss J.-C., (2005) Parnassiinae of the World - Part 4, Hillside Books, Canterbury, UK.
- Selected articles by Eisner for the Leiden Museum Search
