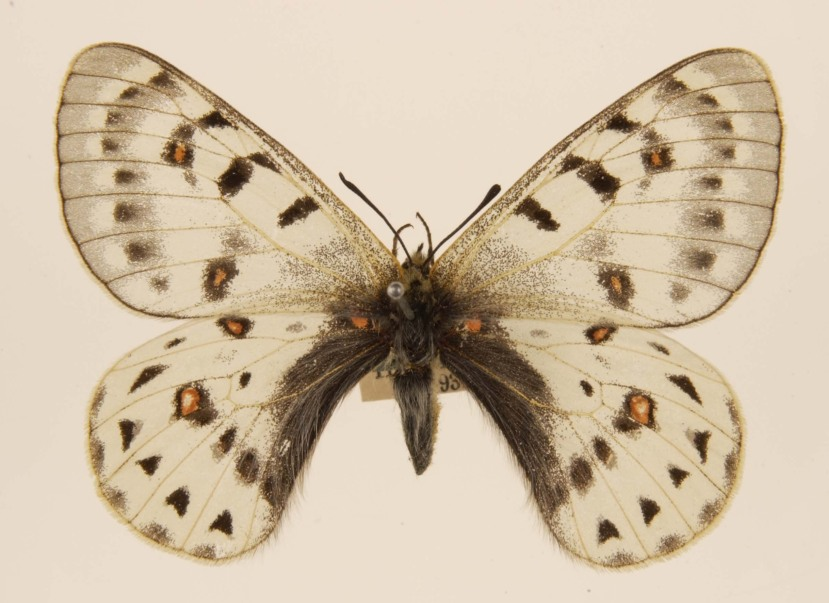

Scientific classification
- Domain: Eukaryota
- Kingdom: Animalia
- Phylum: Arthropoda
- Class: Insecta
- Order: Lepidoptera
- Family: Papilionidae
- Genus: Parnassius
- Species: P. tenedius

Binomial name
- Parnassius tenedius Eversmann, 1851

= Parnassius tenedius =

Tenedius Apollo

Species of butterfly

Parnassius tenedius, the tenedius Apollo, is an east Palearctic member of the snow Apollo genus (Parnassius) of the swallowtail family (Papilionidae). Populations range from Siberia and the Far East of Russia to the western Chukchi Peninsula, Mongolia and north China. The larva feeds on Corydalis species. In the northern part of its range it is a low altitude butterfly; further south it is montane.

== Description ==
The forewing length is 17–31 mm; the wings have a white ground colour, often with a yellowish tint, and in females with a dark suffusion. The pattern consists of small separate black spots or strokes. Reddish or yellowish spots on the hindwings are elongate and to some extent stretched along the veins and may be reduced. The small sphragis is irregular in shape. The eggs are white and glossy, with a fine cell sculpture. The shape is hemispheric with a dimple at the apex. The larva is dark brown with a row of pale-orange spots along the dorsum and two similar lateral rows on either side.

Description by Adalbert Seitz (1909):

deviates somewhat from the general aspect of the [Parnassius acco] group [(acco, Parnassius simo and tenedius)], male with theordinary cell-spots, the central one rounded, further with an abbreviated band distally of cell bearing 2 more or less distinct red dots; with narrow vitreous margin and a submarginal row of sharply marked small black spots. Hindwing with red basal spot; ocelli small, at the apex of cell a small black streak, near the edge a row of small black spots; the spots stronger below, between the posterior ocellus and the anal angle a complete chain of usually red-centred spots which shine through above, basal spots much prolonged. female more strongly marked, the costal spots of forewing more profusely red, the hindmarginal Spot being also filled in with red; black-grey abdominal area of hindwing wider, the anal spots marked also on upperside, all the red paler, the distal margin blackish. — East Turkestan: Issykkul; South Siberia: Altai, Sajan, Kentei Mts.upper districts of the Lena and Viljui (July), Jakutsk."

=== Subspecies ===
- Parnassius tenedius britae Bryk, 1932 East Siberia smaller size, in females there are a yellowish tint on the wings and the greyish marginal spots on the hindwings are fused into a continuous margin about 2 mm wide.
- Parnassius tenedius scepticus Bryk & Eisner, 1932 Described from Pribaikalye and the Stanovoe Nagorye upland
- Parnassius tenedius vulcanus Bryk & Eisner, 1932 Described from Altai (= sceptica Bryk in Korshunov & Gorbunov, 1995)

== Biology ==
P. tenedius is found where the food plant Corydalis (Corydalis capnoides in Altai) grows, that is in open forests and other places with disturbed soil. In Southern Siberia it occurs in the upper part of the forest belt at altitudes of 1000–2600 m, in Northern Siberia it occurs in valleys. The butterflies fly only in warm sun and when the sun disappears they rest with the wings spread on the ground or on stones. In Altai adults have been observed feeding on the flowers of Iris humilis. Eggs are laid singly. Often several eggs are laid on (sometimes in a row of 5-7) one young Corydalis or near it. The larvae hatch 7–10 days after oviposition. They pupate in the middle of the summer, the pupae hibernate. In Altai adults are found in late April to late June, in the mountains of Northeast Siberia adults emerge later from May until July.
