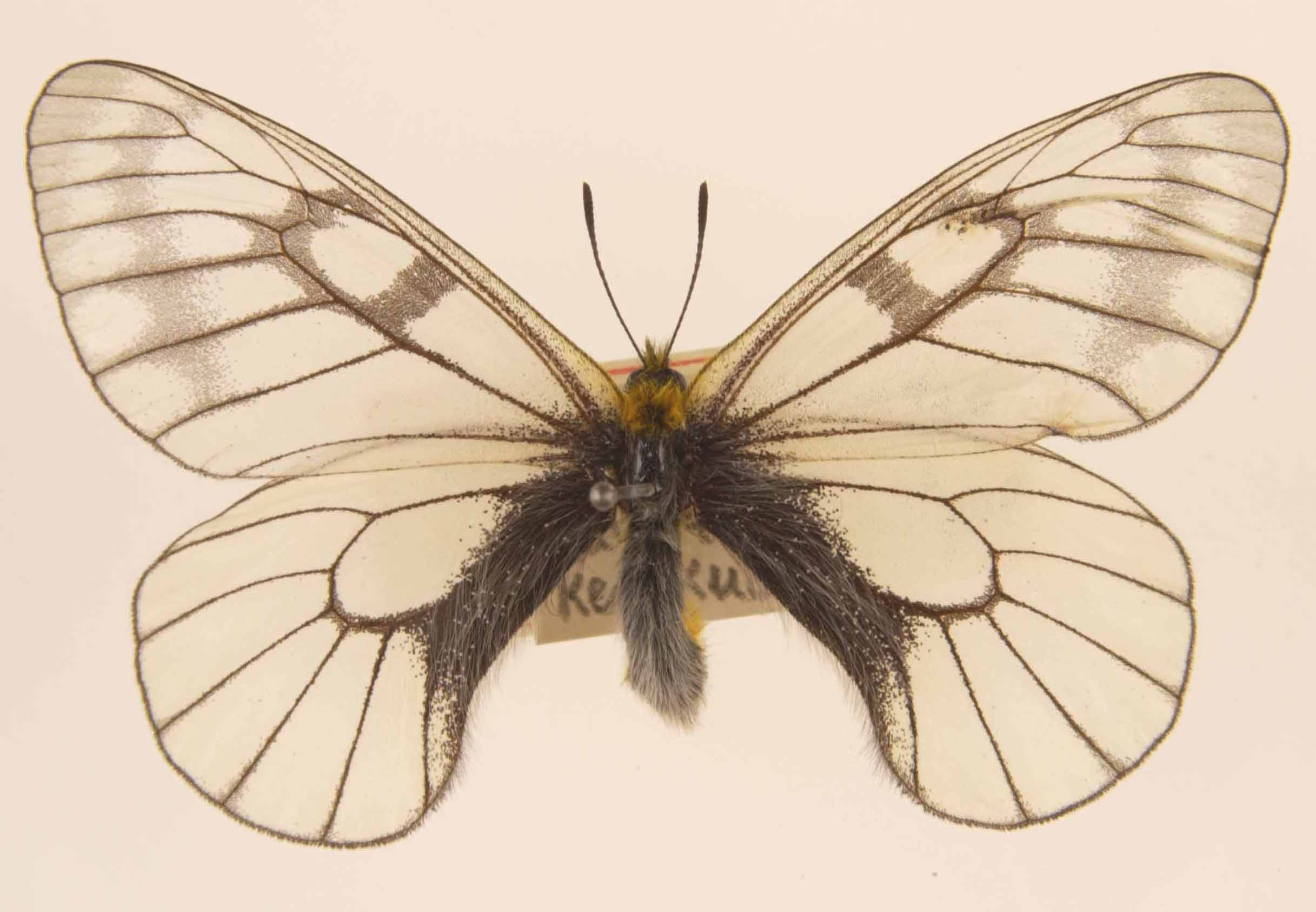
- Paratype of P. g. shikokuensis from Isizuchi, Shikoku, Japan

Scientific classification
- Kingdom: Animalia
- Phylum: Arthropoda
- Clade: Pancrustacea
- Class: Insecta
- Order: Lepidoptera
- Family: Papilionidae
- Genus: Parnassius
- Species: P. glacialis

Binomial name
- Parnassius glacialis Butler, 1866

= Parnassius glacialis =

Glacial Apollo

Species of butterfly

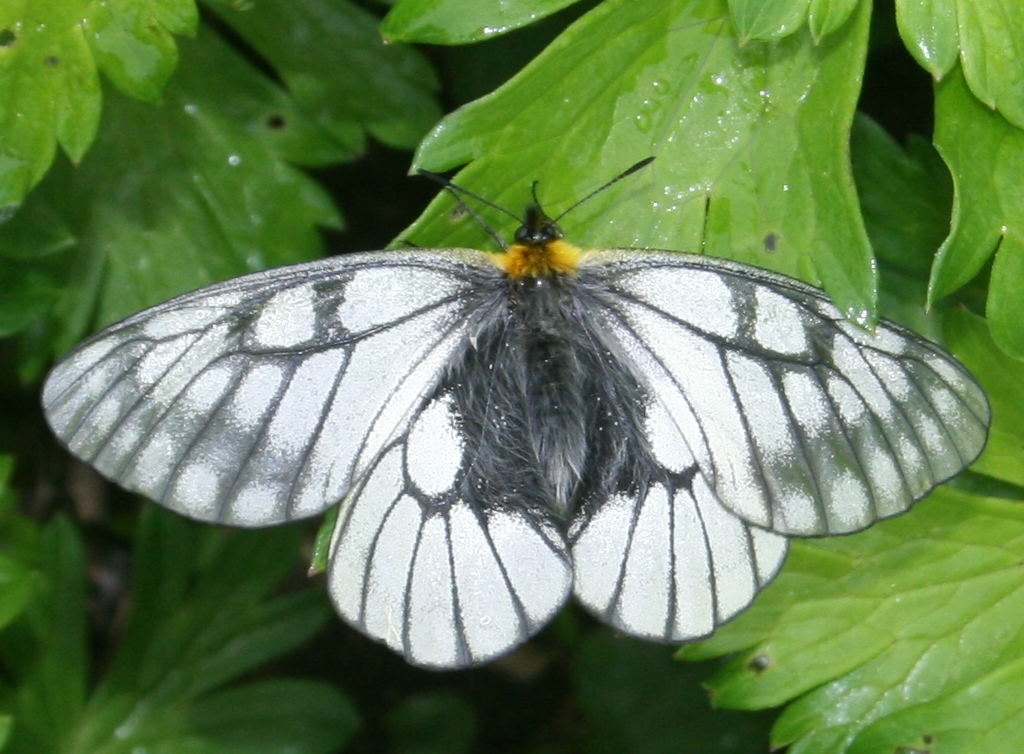
In Mount Ryōzen, Japan

Parnassius glacialis, the glacial Apollo or Japanese clouded Apollo, is a high-altitude butterfly found in Japan, eastern China, and Korea. It is a member of the snow Apollo genus (Parnassius) of the swallowtail family (Papilionidae).

== Description ==
P. glacialis (Takashi et al. 2001) is much larger than Parnassius stubbendorfi of which it was once considered a subspecies. The blackish grey central spot of the cell is sometimes connected with the apical cell-spot by fuscous dusting along the sides of the cell, and the submarginal band of the forewing is more or less distinct and complete. The abdominal area of hindwing is deep black as far as the cell, clothed with white hairs; on and along the veins with blackish dusting. Collar, coxae and abdomen are laterally clothed with yellow or reddish yellow hairs. The wing underside is slightly yellow. In some Japanese specimens (from Hakodate) the cell-spots and the submarginal band of the forewing have entirely disappeared, or are only feebly indicated.

== Classification ==
P. glacialis has fifteen subspecies (mostly described by Felix Bryk and Curt Eisner). For a list of subspecies types in the British Museum (Natural History), see Ackery, P. R. (1973) A list of the type-specimens of Parnassius (Lepidoptera: Papilionidae) in the British Museum (Natural History). Bulletin of the British Museum (Natural History) Entomology 29 (1) (9.XI.1973): 1—35, 1 pl.

== Range ==
It is found in eastern China, Korea and Japan. The type locality is "in Hakodadi (North Japan)" (by lectotype designation).Hakodadi is located near the southern limit of Hokkaido.

== Status ==
This butterfly is abundant but threatened by urbanisation in some areas.

== Identification ==
The Parnassius genus of butterflies is often hard to identify and can sometimes only be identified by dissection of the genitalia.

== See also ==
- Papilionidae
