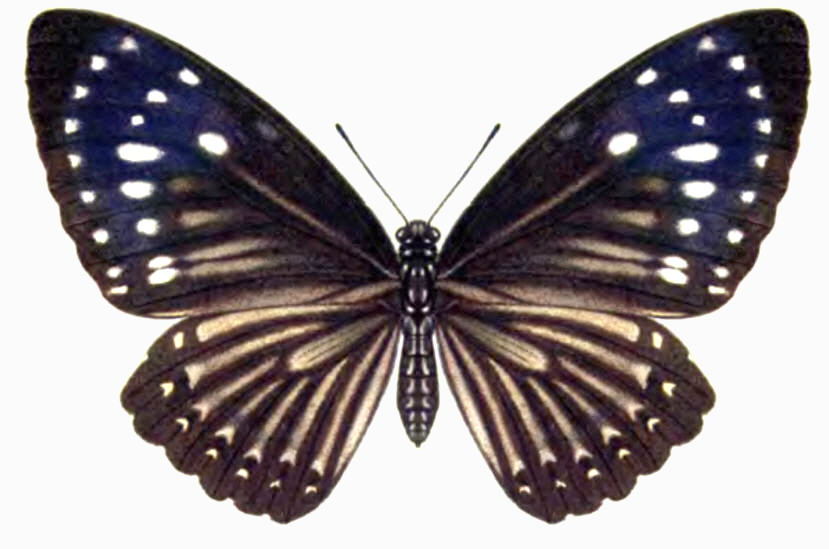

Scientific classification
- Kingdom: Animalia
- Phylum: Arthropoda
- Clade: Pancrustacea
- Class: Insecta
- Order: Lepidoptera
- Family: Papilionidae
- Genus: Papilio
- Species: P. paradoxa

Binomial name
- Papilio paradoxa Zincken, 1831

Synonyms
- Chilasa paradoxus

= Papilio paradoxa =

Great blue mime

Species of butterfly

Papilio (Chilasa) paradoxa, the great blue mime, is a swallowtail butterfly found in India and parts of South-East Asia. The butterfly belongs to the mime subgenus, Chilasa, of the genus Papilio (black-bodied swallowtails). It is an excellent mimic of different species of Euploea (sub-family Danainae).

== Description ==
From Charles Thomas Bingham (1905) The Fauna of British India, Including Ceylon and Burma, Butterflies Vol. 1:

Papilio paradoxus Race telearchus

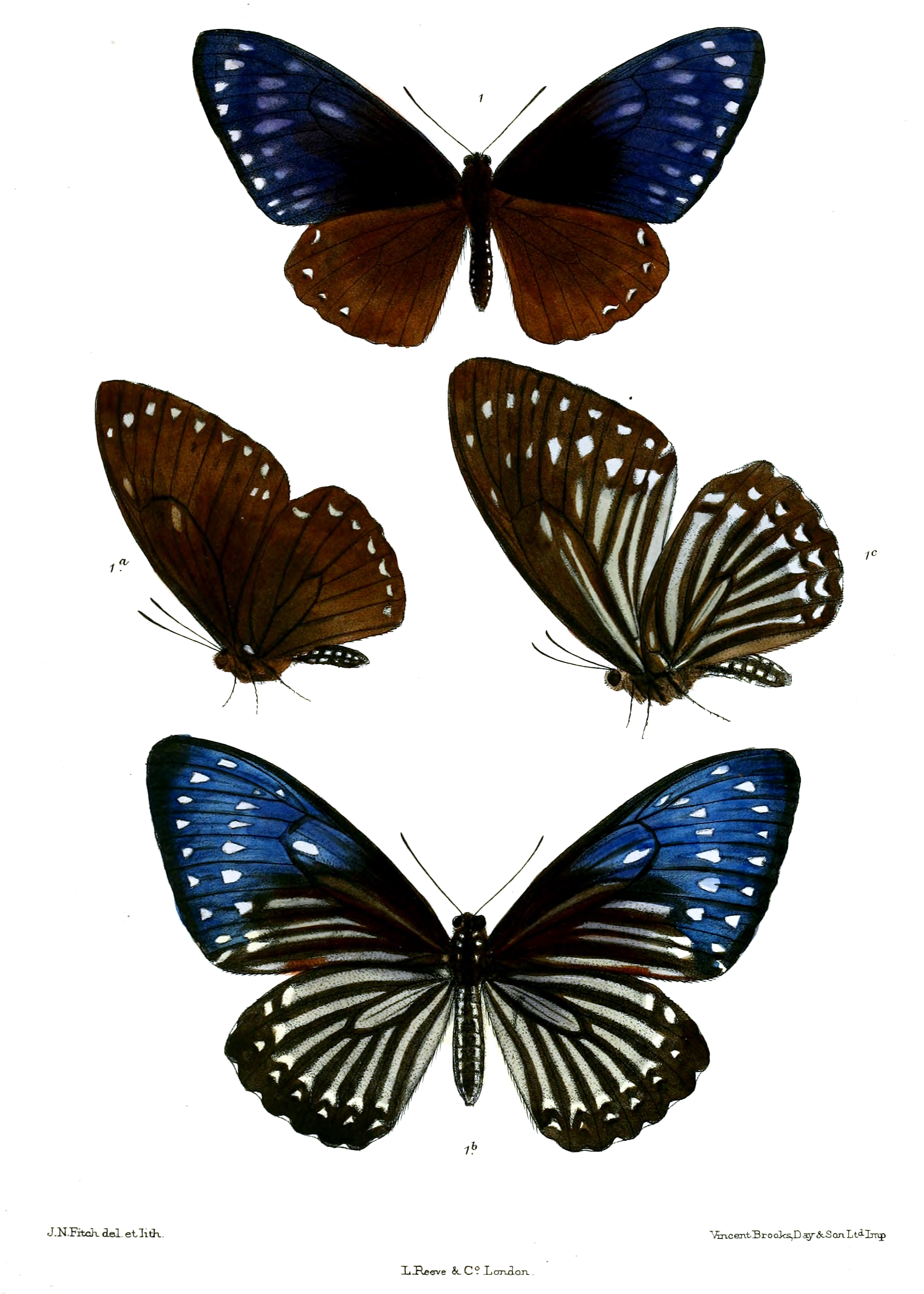

- Race telearchus, Hewitson-Male, Upperside: forewing dark brown richly shot with blue, a short oval streak or large spot and a postdiscal and subterminal complete series of spots bluish white; both the series curve inwards on the wing anteriorly, the inner series of spots elongate. Hindwing rich hair-brown, with or without a subterminal series of white specks that increase in size anteriorly. Underside rich chocolate brown. Forewing: the cellular short streak faintly indicated, the postdiscal series of spots of the upperside not present, the subterminal series white, the spots much reduced in size. Hindwing: markings as on the upperside. Cilia dark brown alternated sparsely with white. Antennae black; head, thorax and abdomen velvety brown, the head and anterior portion of thorax and the thorax and abdomen beneath sparsely spotted with white. Female. Upperside, forewing: basal half dull brown, apical half brown shot with brilliant blue; markings as in the male, but larger and whiter, the spots in the postdiscal series more elongate. Hindwing brown, a series of comparatively broad whitish streaks in the cell and in all the interspaces, those in the latter end in a postdiscal series of whitish spots; beyond these a prominent subterminal series of whitish spots. Cilia brown, white in the middle of the interspaces. Underside: pale dull brown markings much as on the upperside, but larger, more diffuse, with the addition on the forewing of whitish streaks in the cell and in the interspaces posteriorly. Antennae black; head, thorax and abdomen blackish brown, more fully spotted with white than in the male.

The second and rarer form of the female closely resembles the male, but is larger and paler, with the pale blue-glossed spots on the upperside of the forewing elongate and more prominent and the ground colour lighter than in the male.

- Expanse: 120–150 mm
- Habitat: Assam, Burma, Tenasserim, extending to Siam.

Papilio caunus

Race danisepa, Butler- Male. Upperside rich velvety brown shot with blue. Forewing: apical third of cell, four short streaks beyond in interspaces 4,5,6 and 9 and a subterminal series of spots curved inwards opposite the apex, bluish white. Hindwing: the cell, a series of streaks from the bases of interspaces 1 to 7 and an incomplete subterminal series of minute spots, white; the streaks in interspaces 4 and 5 short, those in the interspaces above and below gradually longer. Underside brown without the blue gloss; markings as on the upperside, but the subterminal markings on the hindwing complete. Antennae, head, thorax and abdomen black; beneath, the thorax and abdomen with a few white spots. Female. Resembles the male, but the blue gloss on both forewing and hindwing is more restricted, the ground colour paler brown, somewhat of a rich golden bronze, and the white markings are fuller and broader.

- Expanse 110–132 mm
- Habitat: The hills of Assam; Arrakan; Upper and Lower Burma; Tenasserim, extending to Siam.

I first came across this magnificent butterfly on the Tannjah Pass, 1000 feet, over the Dawnat mountains in Tenasserim, and until I had caught and examined it, mistook it for an extraordinarily large specimen of Euploea rhadamanthus. It is apparently sometimes, notwithstanding its disguise, attacked and preyed upon by the Pigmy Falcon (Microhierax caerulescens), as in the nest-hole of a pair of these birds I once found the fragment of a forewing of a butterfly which was identified by the late Mr. de Niceville as belonging to this form of P. caunus.

== Distribution ==
The butterfly is found in northern India (including Assam and Arunachal Pradesh), Bangladesh, and Myanmar. It is also found in southern China, Vietnam, Thailand, Laos, Kampuchea, peninsular and eastern Malaysia, Philippines (Palawan), Brunei and Indonesia (Sumatra, Banka, Nias, and Kalimantan).

== Status ==
Never common but not known to be threatened. Considered rare in India by William Harry Evans and Mark Alexander Wynter-Blyth. Only one subspecies of the butterfly occurs in Indian territory, P. (C.) p. telearchus (Hewitson), which is protected by law in India.

== Habitat ==
This is a forest species and is generally found in low elevations.

== Mimicry ==
Imago (form danisepa) from the Garo Hills, Meghalaya

The typical form of the great blue mime mimics the striped blue crow (Euploea mulciber) in both sexes. There also occurs in India a form danisepa which mimics the magpie crow (Euploea radamanthus). Though the great mimes are easily distinguished when caught, in flight they very closely resemble the mimicked butterflies.

== Habits ==
The flight of the mime mimics that of the species it resembles. It is fond of settling on damp patches.

== See also ==
- Papilionidae
- List of butterflies of India
- List of butterflies of India (Papilionidae)
