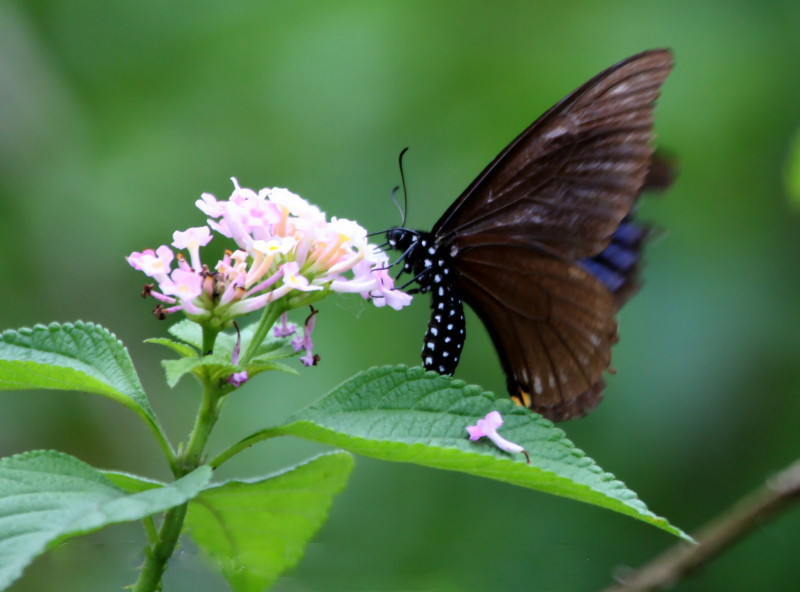

Scientific classification
- Kingdom: Animalia
- Phylum: Arthropoda
- Clade: Pancrustacea
- Class: Insecta
- Order: Lepidoptera
- Family: Papilionidae
- Genus: Papilio
- Species: P. slateri

Binomial name
- Papilio slateri Hewitson, 1857

Synonyms
- Chilasa slateri

= Papilio slateri =

Blue striped mime

Species of butterfly

Papilio (Chilasa) slateri, the blue striped mime, is a swallowtail butterfly found across south and south-east Asia. The butterfly belongs to the mime subgenus, Chilasa, of the genus Papilio, the black-bodied swallowtails. The nominate subspecies is found in India and is also called the brown mime. It is a good example of mimicry among Indian butterflies.

== Description ==
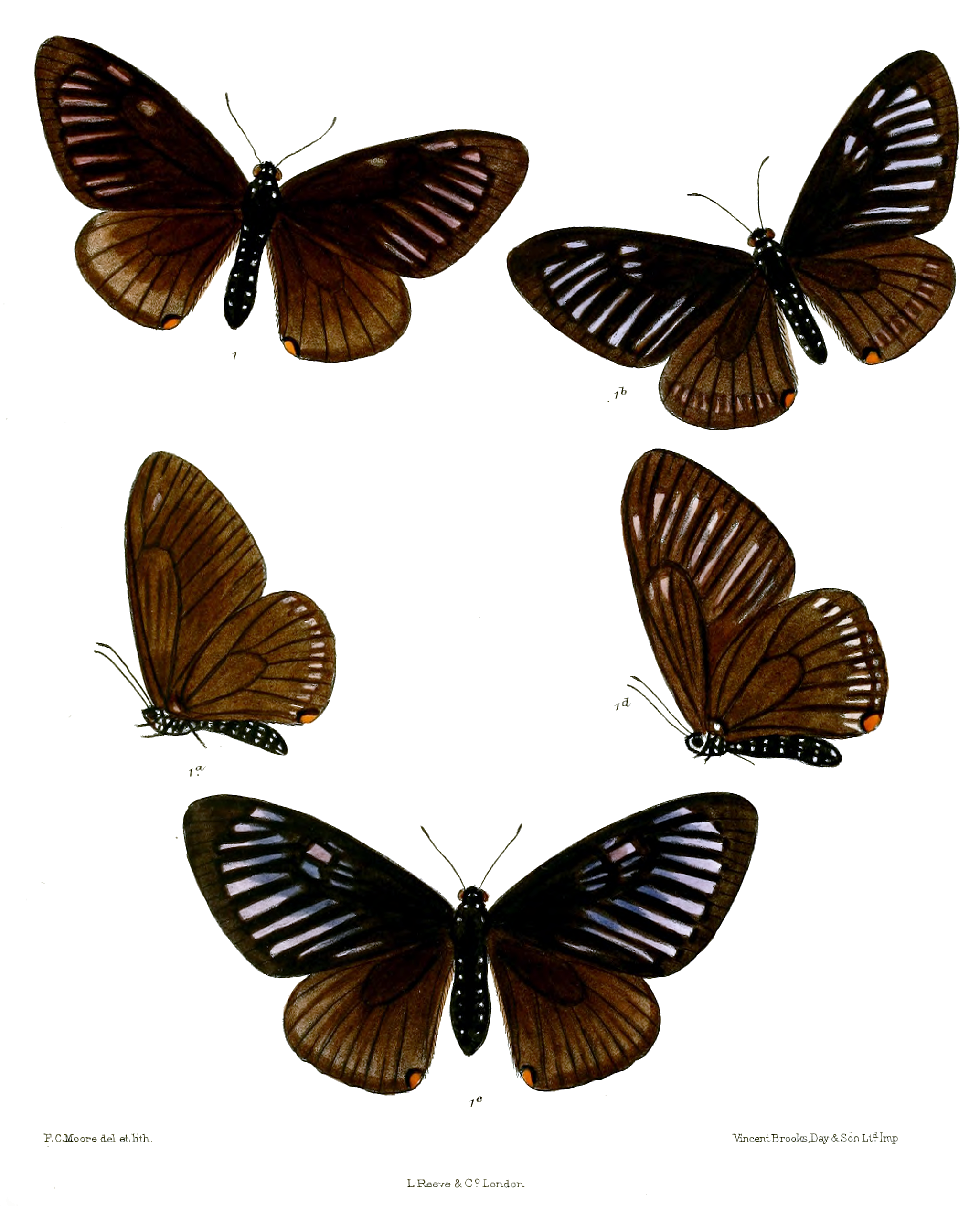
Blue-striped mime (Papilio slateri) from Lepidoptera Indica (Volume 6).

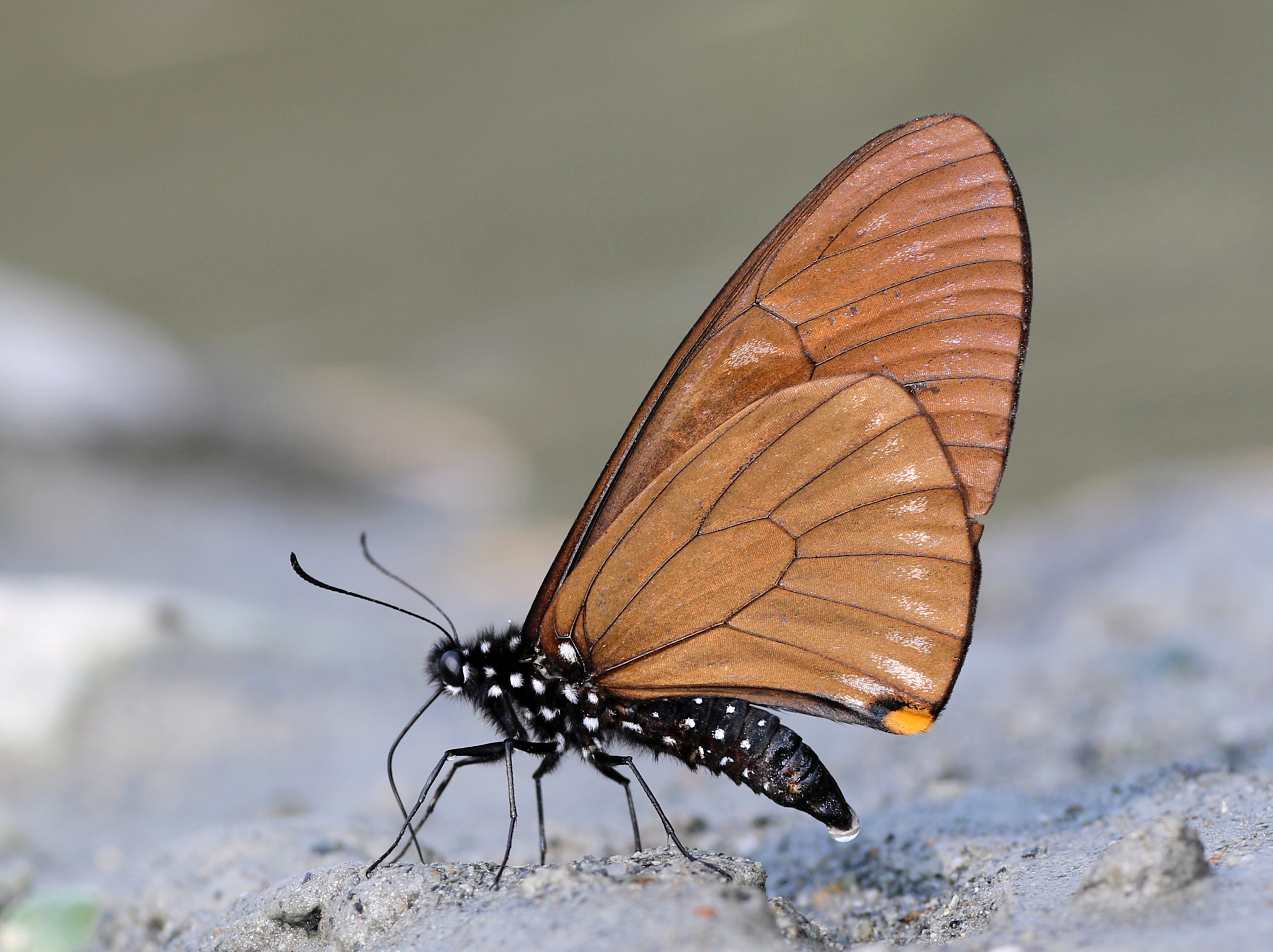
Male blue-striped mime (papilio slateri), mud-puddling and urinating, found at the border of India and Bhutan.

Male upperside: forewing rich velvety black, slightly paler towards apex and along the terminal margin; two or three somewhat obscure spots or short streaks in apex of cell followed by an internervular series of slightly clavate (club shaped), outwardly truncate, blue streaks that in certain lights have a violet tint; outwardly the ends of these streaks form a curve at some distance from the terminal margin and inwardly they do not reach the bases of the interspaces. Hindwing: dark chocolate brown, the subterminal series of short white streaks of the underside show though very faintly. Underside dull chocolate brown. Forewing: the cellular and internervular blue streaks of the upperside faintly represented by diffuse white patches of scales. Hindwing: a small white spot at extreme base of wing; a subterminal series of inwardly diffuse white streaks in the interspaces and an ochraceous tornal spot as on the upperside. Antennae, head, thorax and abdomen black; the thorax beneath sparsely speckled with white; the abdomen with two lateral rows of small spots.

Female similar to the male; the blue intercellular and internervular streaks on the upperside of the forewing slightly more prominent.

== Distribution ==
The butterfly is found in India from northern West Bengal, Sikkim and right across from Assam to north Myanmar. It is also found in Thailand, southern China, northern Vietnam, Laos, Kampuchea, peninsular and eastern Malaysia, Brunei and Indonesia (Kalimantan and northern Sumatra).

== Status ==
It is not rare in Sikkim though considered rare in India by Mark Alexander Wynter-Blyth. While not known to be threatened as a species, the nominate subspecies is protected by law in India.

== Habitat ==
This is a butterfly of hilly regions but also found at lower elevations. It is plentiful in the pre-monsoon and monsoon period and becomes scarce later on. It has been recorded in Sikkim in April

== Mimicry ==
The blue-striped mime mimics the blue crows, members of the genus Euploea of the danaids, now part of family Nymphalidae.

== Habits ==
The blue-striped mime flies slowly closely mimicking the flight of the species it resembles, generally staying a few metres above the ground. The mime settles for short spells on the ground. It displays territorial behaviour and patrols its beat aggressively driving away any intruders. It does not visit flowers. It has been found frequenting the clearings of oak forests in Sikkim.

== Life cycle ==
It has only one brood and is known to fly in March in low elevations.

== See also ==
- Papilionidae
- List of butterflies of India
- List of butterflies of India (Papilionidae)

== Other reading ==
- Evans, W.H. (1932). The Identification of Indian Butterflies (2nd ed.). Mumbai, India: Bombay Natural History Society.
- Gay, Thomas; Kehimkar, Isaac David; Punetha, Jagdish Chandra (1992). Common Butterflies of India. Nature Guides. Bombay, India: World Wide Fund for Nature-India by Oxford University Press. ISBN 978-0195631647.
- Haribal, Meena (1992). The Butterflies of Sikkim Himalaya and Their Natural History. Gangtok, Sikkim, India: Sikkim Nature Conservation Foundation.
- Kunte, Krushnamegh (2000). Butterflies of Peninsular India. India, A Lifescape. Hyderabad, India: Universities Press. ISBN 978-8173713545.
- Wynter-Blyth, Mark Alexander (1957). Butterflies of the Indian Region. Bombay, India: Bombay Natural History Society. ISBN 978-8170192329.
