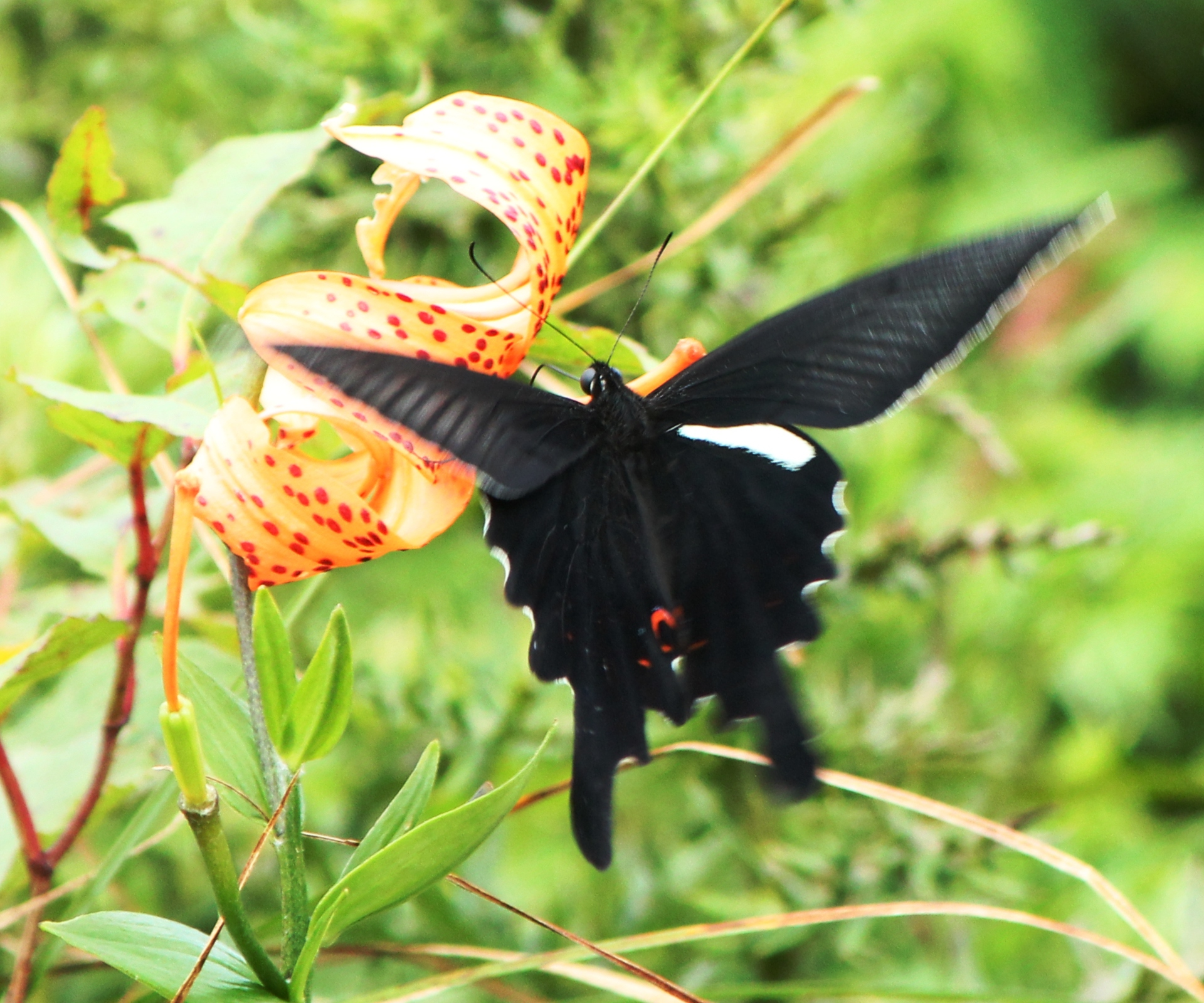
- A live individual
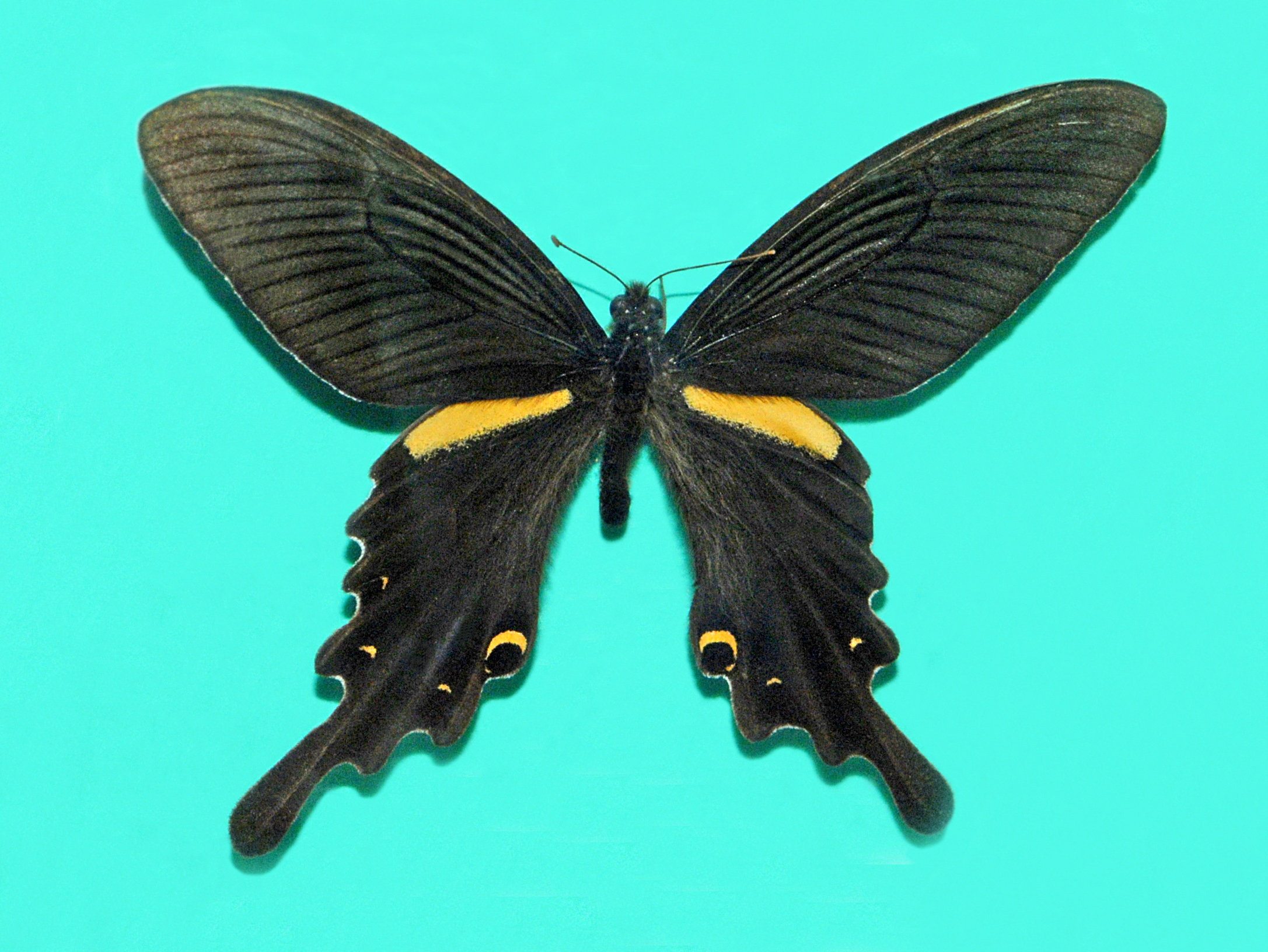
- Museum specimen

Scientific classification
- Kingdom: Animalia
- Phylum: Arthropoda
- Clade: Pancrustacea
- Class: Insecta
- Order: Lepidoptera
- Family: Papilionidae
- Genus: Papilio
- Species: P. macilentus

Binomial name
- Papilio macilentus Janson, 1877

= Papilio macilentus =

Species of butterfly

Papilio macilentus, the long tailed spangle, is a butterfly of the family Papilionidae. The species was first described by Oliver Erichson Janson in 1877.

== Description ==
The wingspan of Papilio macilentus reaches about 9–12 centimetres (3.5–4.7 in). Wings are black, with red spots, wavy edges and long tails on its hindwings. At the outer edge of the hindwings there is row of small red spots, while at the inner edge there is a red eyespot. This species has one of the longest and nicely-shaped tails in the family Papilionidae. Males have a yellow transversal band in the overlapping part between the forewings and the hindwings.The underside of the forewings is dark brown, with black veins. The thorax, the head and the abdomen are black.

== Original description ==
Papilio macilentus n. sp.

Allied to P. demetrius, Cram. [Papilio protenor demetrius Stoll, [1782] ], but with all the wings narrower and much more elongated; primaries above dusky black, the black streaks between the nervures very narrow; secondaries with the outer margin strongly notched, the tails long and narrow, black, costa pale yellow, four small indistinct spots along the outer margin, and a broad ring on the abdominal margin dull red; beneath the primaries are paler than demetrius and somewhat shining; secondaries with four lunular spots along the outer margin, an interrupted ring on the abdominal margin, and a spot near the anal angle pale red. Expanse of wings 3 and 3/4 4 and 1/4 inches.

The very long slender wings are sufficient to distinguish this species at once from P. demetrius, Cram., the only species which resembles it in other respects; it appears to be confined to the mountains, and has been taken by Messrs. Pryer and Jonas on Oyama.

== Biology ==
The spring type is found from April to June, and the summer type from July to August. During daytime, females fly low and lay eggs one by one on the leaves of the plants. The larvae feed on Rutaceae species (Orixa japonica, Poncirus trifoliata, Ruta graveolens, Zanthoxylum ailanthoides, Zanthoxylum piperitum, Zanthoxylum schinifolium). The spring brood hibernates in the pupal stage. Pupae have two types of colors - green and gray brown.

== Distribution and habitat ==
This species can be found in Japan, China and Korea. It lives in the valleys or the margins of the forest.
