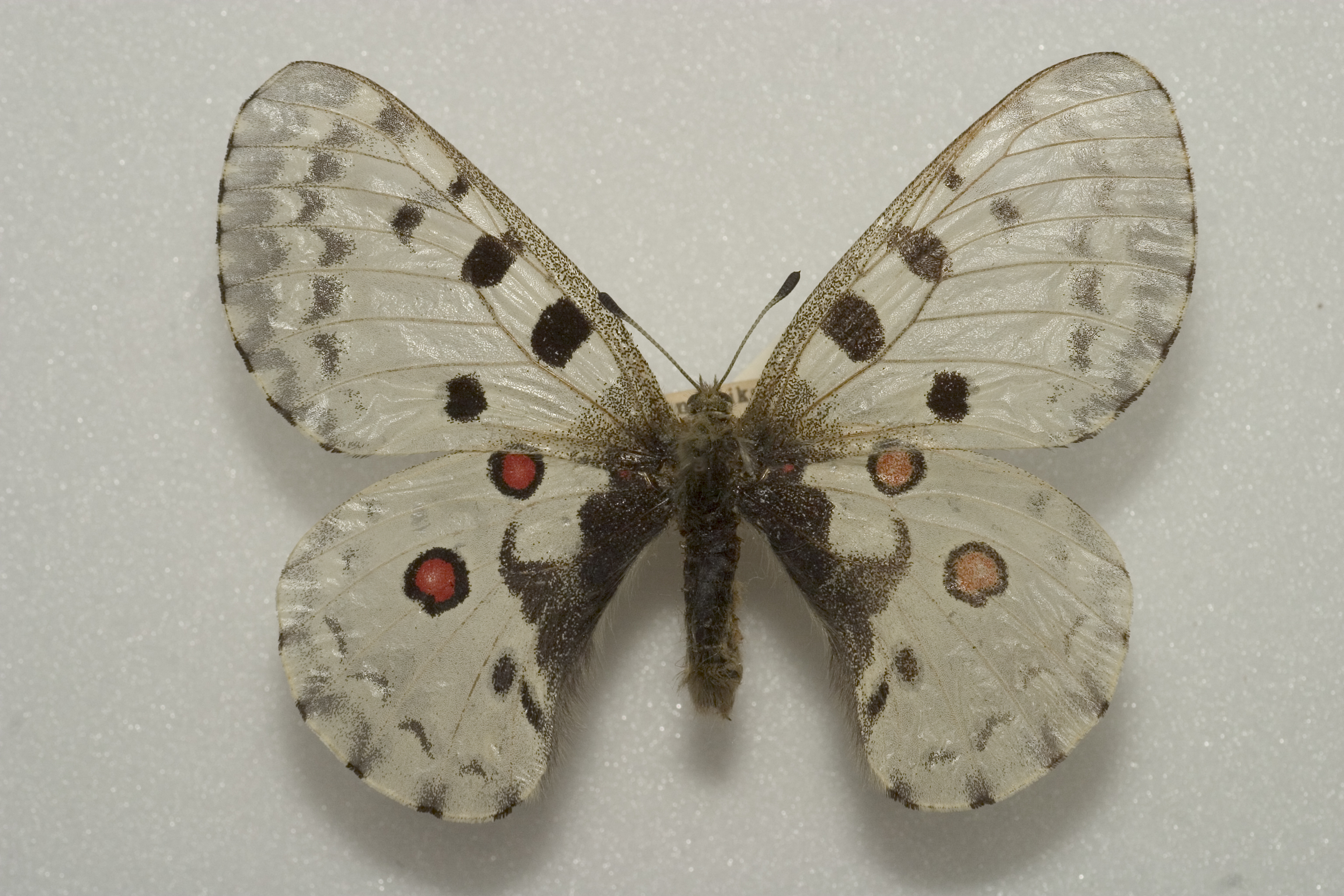

Scientific classification
- Domain: Eukaryota
- Kingdom: Animalia
- Phylum: Arthropoda
- Class: Insecta
- Order: Lepidoptera
- Family: Papilionidae
- Genus: Parnassius
- Species: P. nomion

Binomial name
- Parnassius nomion von Waldheim, 1823

= Parnassius nomion =

Nomion Apollo

Species of butterfly

Parnassius nomion, the Nomion Apollo, is a forest steppe butterfly which is found in the Urals, Altai, south Siberia, Amur and the Ussuri region, Mongolia, China and Korea. It is a member of the snow Apollo genus (Parnassius) of the swallowtail family (Papilionidae).

Populations vary throughout its range and there are very many described subspecies. The adult flies from July to mid-August and the larvae feed on Sedum and Orostachys (Crassulaceae).

== Description ==
Similar to Parnassius apollo geminus but differs in the vitreous marginal band of the forewing being broken up into elongate arched spots or lunules, and in the hindwing bearing dark marginal and more sharply marked submarginal spots, the latter being developed to large vitreous half moons, especially on the underside. The hindwing above usually with red basal spot, the whole surface of the wing above with a peculiar silky and below a greasy gloss. The female is darker, more conspicuously marked. Shaft of antenna whitish, club black, abdomen whitish, except a small dorsal portion. In specimens which agree with the figure of the name-type the costal and hind-marginal spots of the forewing are heavily centred with red. If specimens in which only the hind-marginal spot is centred red, while all the other spots of the forewing are black, should be considered worth a name venusi Schauf.

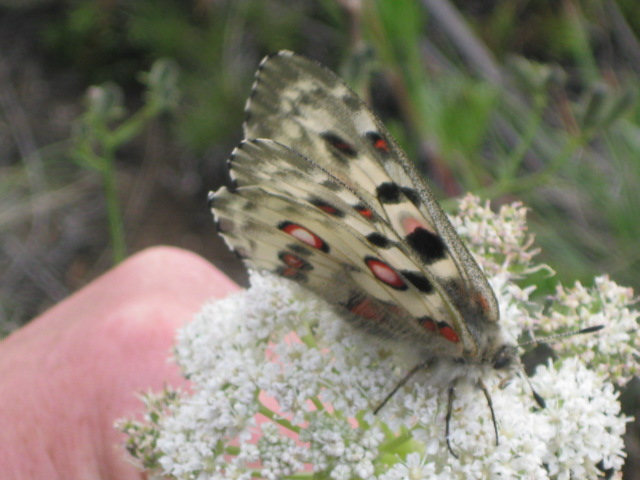
Parnassius nomion nomion. Shot taken on Ogoi Island, Lake Baikal, Russia.

=== Subspecies ===
- Parnassius nomion nomion
- Parnassius nomion aurora O. Bang-Haas, 1933
- Parnassius nomion davidis Oberthür, 1879
- Parnassius nomion dis Grum-Grshimailo, 1890
- Parnassius nomion gabrieli Bryk
- Parnassius nomion korshunovi Kreuzberg & Pljushch, 1992
- Parnassius nomion mandschuriae Oberthür, 1891
- Parnassius nomion minschani Bryk-Eisne
- Parnassius nomion nominulus Staudinger, 1895
- Parnassius nomion nomius Grum-Grshimailo, 1891
- Parnassius nomion oberthuerianus Bryk
- Parnassius nomion richthofeni Bang-Haas
- Parnassius nomion shansiensis Eisner
- Parnassius nomion theagenes Fruhstorfer
- Parnassius nomion tsinlingensis Bryk & Eisner
