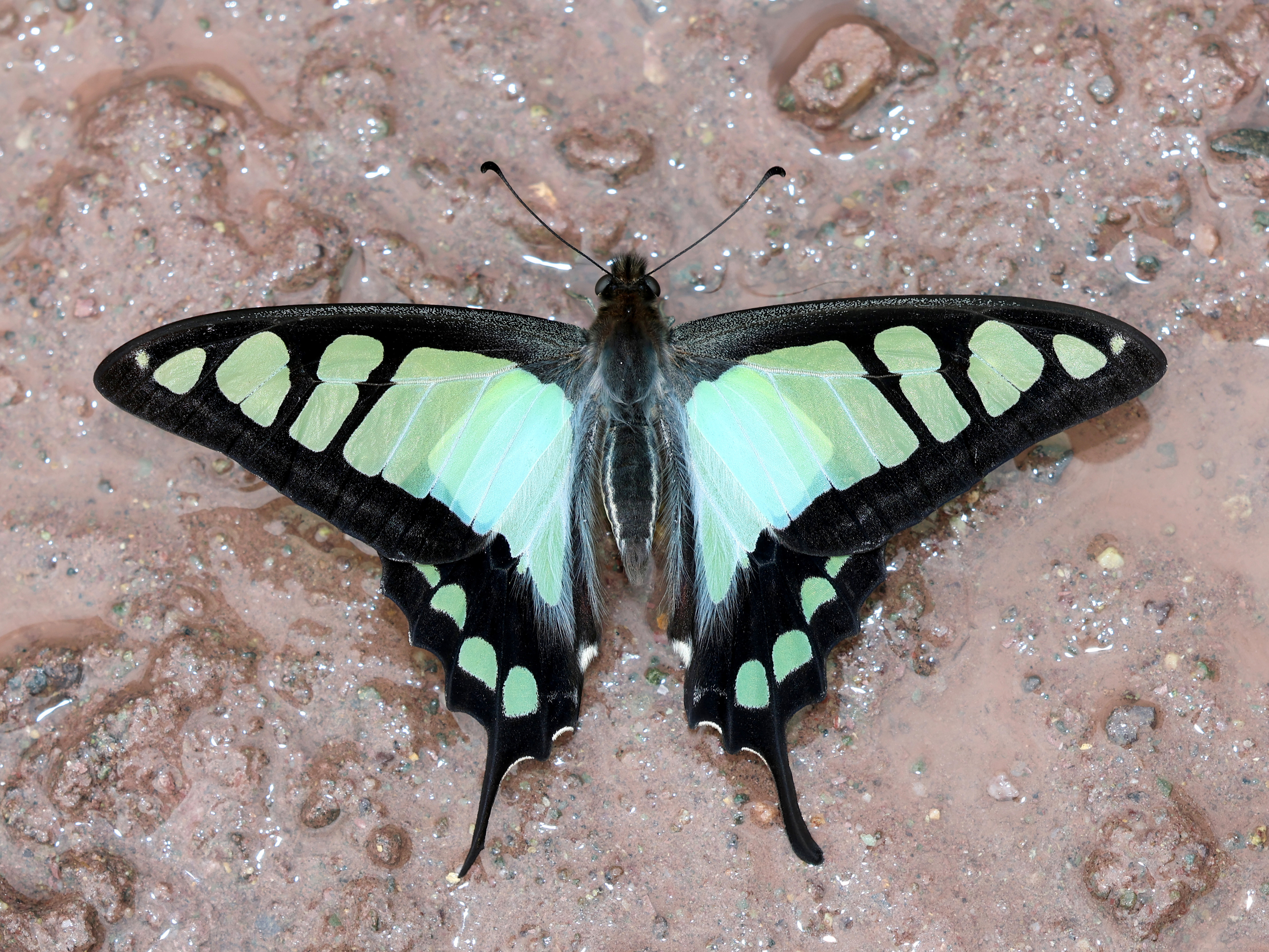

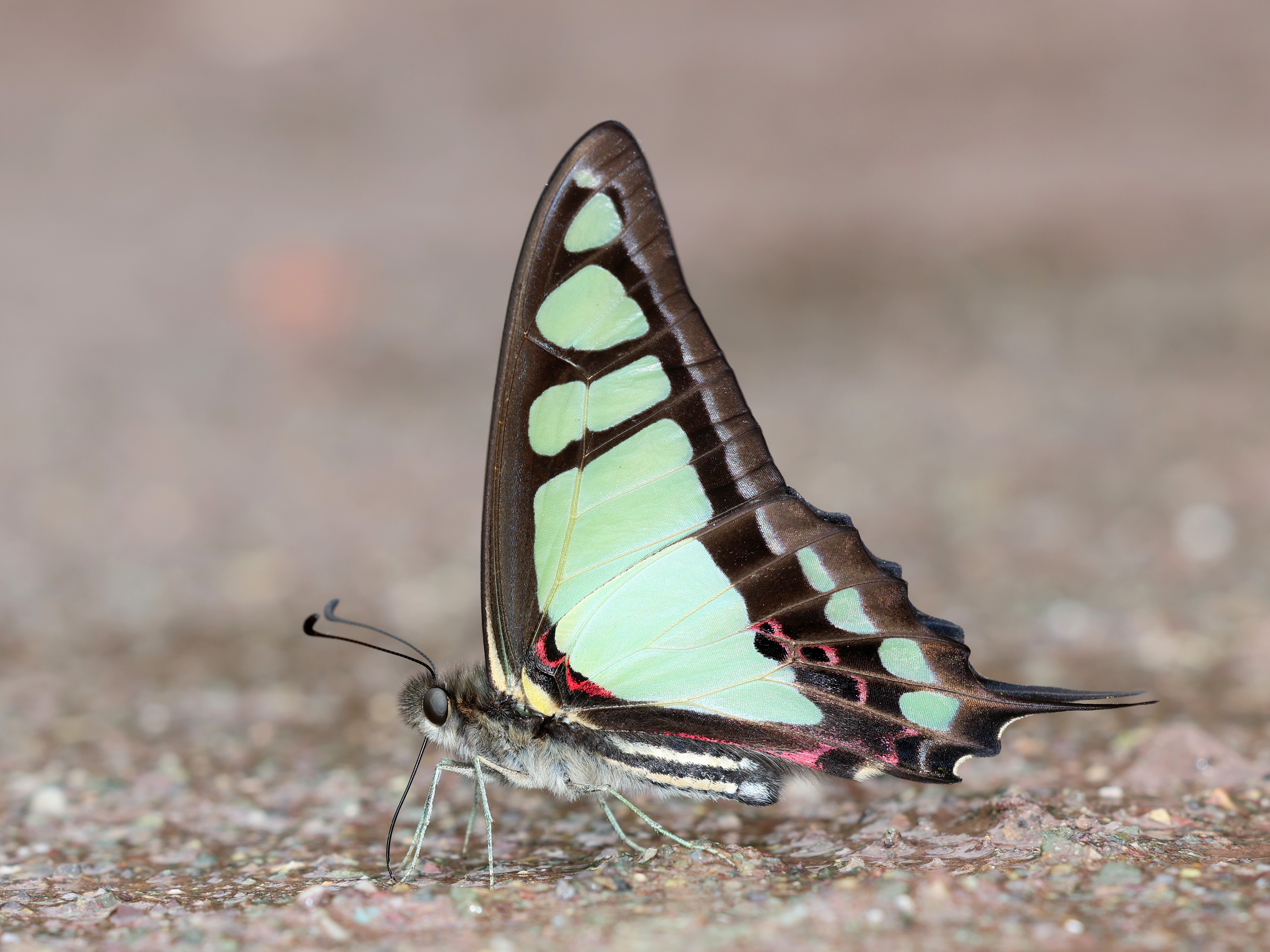

Scientific classification
- Kingdom: Animalia
- Phylum: Arthropoda
- Clade: Pancrustacea
- Class: Insecta
- Order: Lepidoptera
- Family: Papilionidae
- Genus: Graphium
- Species: G. cloanthus

Binomial name
- Graphium cloanthus Cramer, 1775

= Graphium cloanthus =

Glassy bluebottle

Species of butterfly

Graphium cloanthus, the glassy bluebottle, is a common, non-threatened tropical butterfly of the family Papilionidae.

== Description ==
Upperside, forewing: costal margin up to a line through the anterior half of the cell to the apex of the wing and the terminal margin broadly black; the medial portion of the wing pale hyaline (glass like) greenish yellow interrupted anteriorly by the following irregular black bands that join the black on the costa to the black on the termen: a band across middle of cell and along vein 4, another at apex of cell and along vein 5, and two shorter and more oblique nearer the apex of the wing; the hyaline spot left close to the apex much smaller than those below; lastly, a pale subterminal, somewhat obscure broad line. Hindwing: an even black band along the dorsum in continuation of the black on the costal margin of the forewing, joined below to a very broad black band on the terminal margin; the remaining triangular medial portion of the wing and a transverse subterminal series of large spots hyaline greenish-yellow; the dorsal margin of the wing with long soft pale hairs and touches of grey scaling on the tornal area. Underside: similar, with on the hindwing a series of slender crimson markings at extreme base of wing along vein 1, broadened at the tornal angle and in interspaces 2 to 5; lastly, admarginal white slender lines at the tornal angle and in interspaces 2 and 3. Antennae, head, thorax and abdomen dark brownish black, the thorax with lateral dark grey pubescence; beneath: the palpi, thorax and abdomen touched with dingy white, the abdomen with three lateral whitish stripes Male has abdominal fold within grey, studded with a brush of long white hairs as in Graphium sarpedon.

== Larva ==
"Widest at the 5th segment, from which it tapers gradually to the 13th segment. The ridge over the head is furnished with two tubercles, black in front, white posteriorly. The 5th segment has a yellow bar which projects on each side beyond the body and has the appearances of a yoke. The points of the yoke are black. Colour green. The 13th segment is of a pale transparent blue-green. A pale yellow subdorsal line and an almost white spiracular line are the only markings. Head of a greenish-yellow. Legs, claspers and abdomen of the same colour as the 13th segment. The 13th segment ends in two sharp points which join at the end, so that the division between them is visible only on a close examination." (Robson quoted in Bingham 1907)

== See also ==
- Papilionidae
- List of butterflies of India (Papilionidae)
