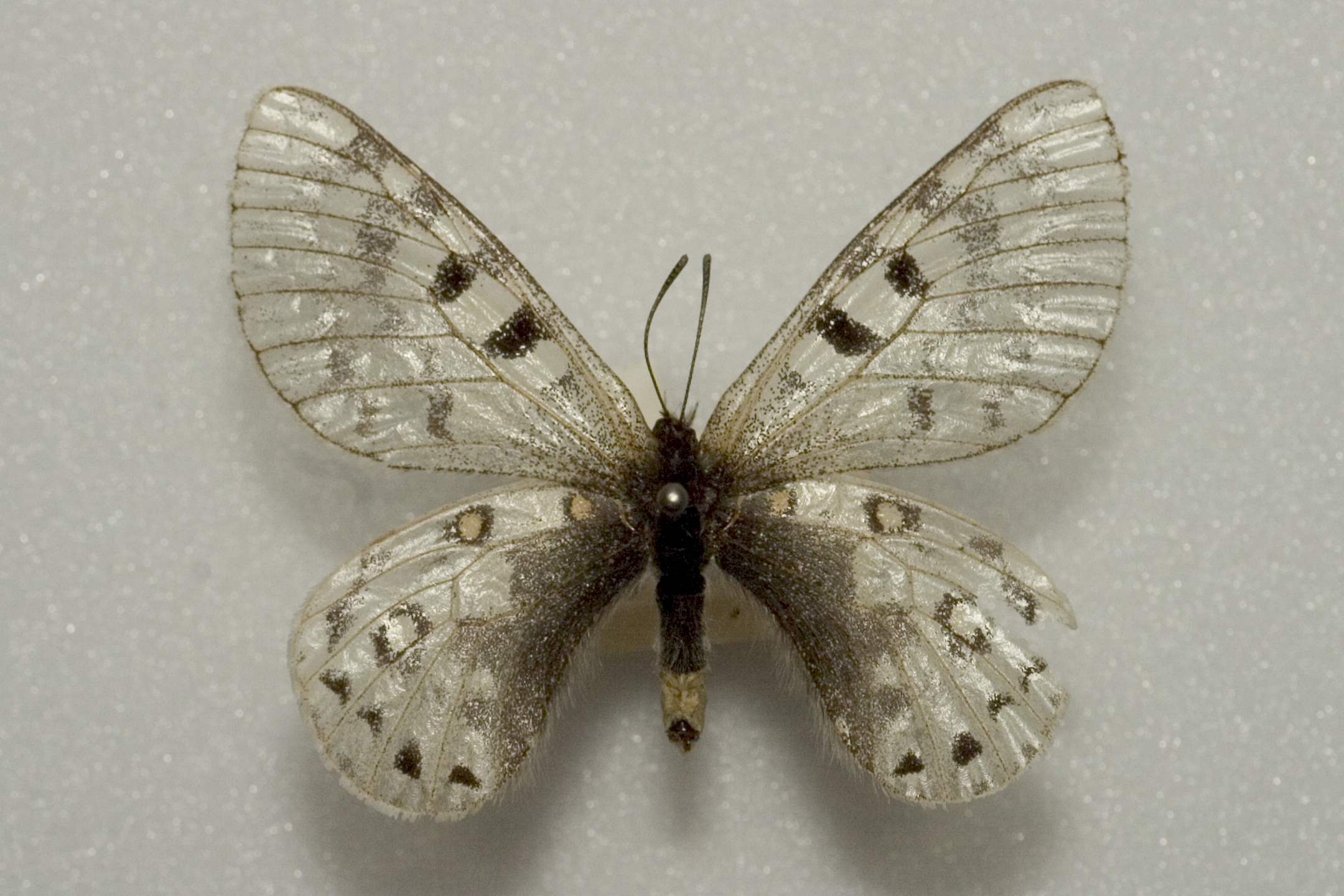

Conservation status
- Near Threatened (IUCN 3.1)

Scientific classification
- Kingdom: Animalia
- Phylum: Arthropoda
- Clade: Pancrustacea
- Class: Insecta
- Order: Lepidoptera
- Family: Papilionidae
- Genus: Parnassius
- Species: P. acco

Binomial name
- Parnassius acco Gray, 1853

= Parnassius acco =

Varnished Apollo

Species of butterfly

Parnassius acco, the varnished Apollo, is a high-altitude butterfly found in Asia. It is a member of the snow Apollo genus Parnassius of the swallowtail family, Papilionidae.

== Description ==
Note. The wing pattern in Parnassius species is inconsistent and the very many subspecies and forms make identification problematic and uncertain. Structural characters derived from the genitalia, wing venation, sphragis and foretibial epiphysis are more, but not entirely reliable. The description given here is a guide only. For an identification key see Ackery P.R. (1975).

Upperside: dull greyish white. Forewing: costal margin and base with an irroration (sprinkling) of black scales, the white scaling clearest and most dense in the cell, this last crossed by a medial and an apical short, broad, transverse jet-black band; beyond apex of cell an irregularly sinuous dusky-black discal band that, usually extends from costa to vein 3, but in some specimens right up to the dorsal margin, in most it bears an anterior crimson spot; this is followed by less irregular and, in most specimens, slightly broader postdiscal and terminal similar transverse bands and a pre-ciliary slender continuous line on termen and dorsum. Hindwing: dorsal half of the wing dusky black, the outer or upper margin of this colour, irregularly indented; a discal, a subcostal and a basal black-encircled spot that varies in colour from crimson to pinkish yellow, followed by a subterminal series of black lunular spots and a narrow terminal band, crossed and interrupted by the white veining. Cilia of both wings conspicuously white. Underside with a glassy appearance. Forewing nearly as on the upperside, but the black markings, except the two bars across the cell, only seen through by transparency from the upperside. Hindwing: ground colour white, the discal, costal, and basal pink or crimson spots also apparently transparency only from the upperside; a discal double ill-defined series of black lunular markings, followed by a subterminal series of similar markings like those on the upperside, but of a duller black and less clearly defined. Antennae dull brownish black, with a more or less copious covering of scattered white scales; abdomen black, clothed with somewhat sparse, long, fine white hairs.

== Range ==
Pakistan, Kashmir, Himachal Pradesh and further east to Sikkim, Nepal and China.

== Status ==
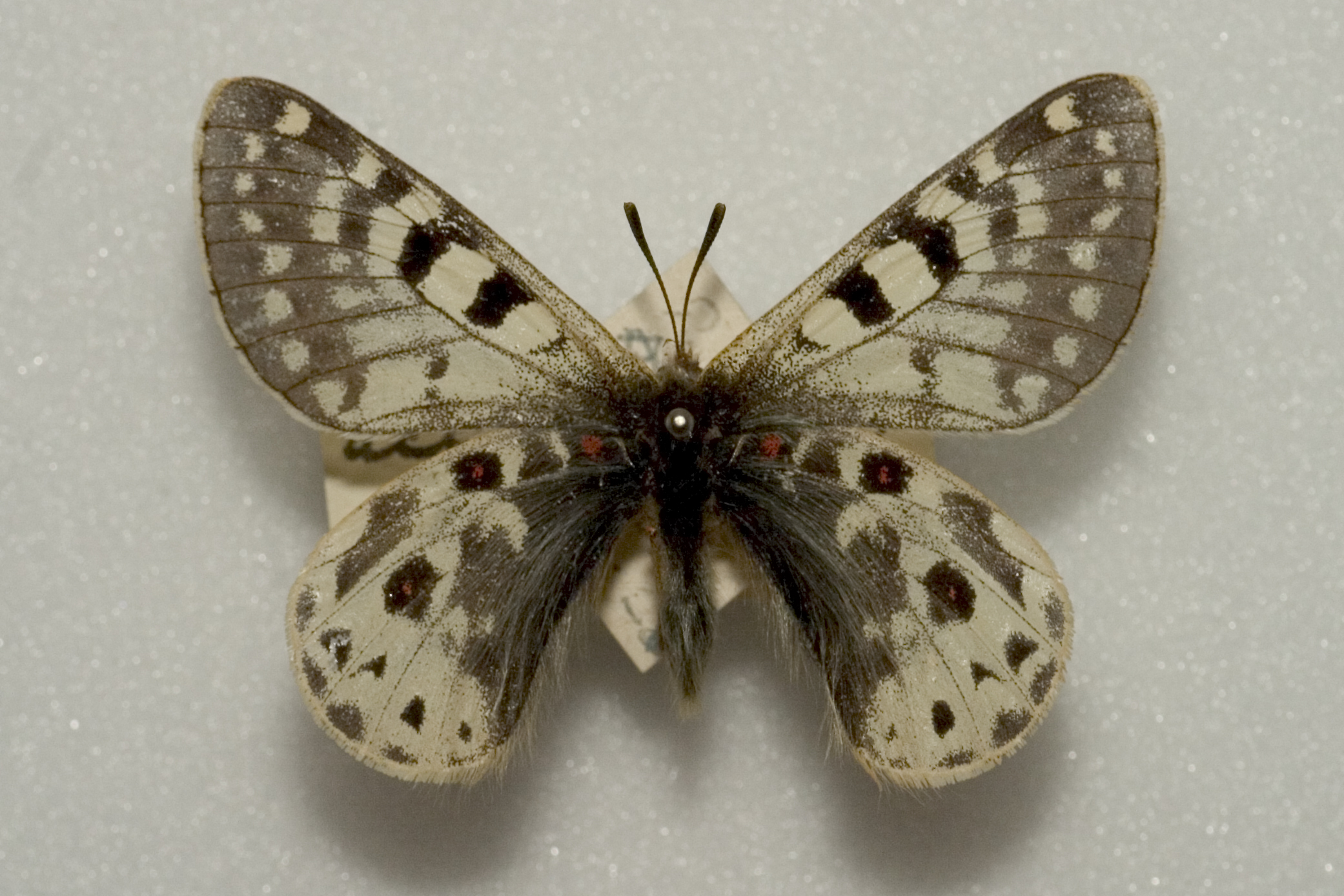
Parnassius acco gemmifer

The species is considered very rare and inadequately known. More information is needed from the Indian highlands and Tibet. The subspecies P. a. geminifer is protected by law in India.

== See also ==
- Papilionidae
- List of butterflies of India
- List of butterflies of India (Papilionidae)

== Other references ==
- Evans, W.H. (1932). The Identification of Indian Butterflies (2nd ed.). Mumbai, India: Bombay Natural History Society.
- Haribal, Meena (1992). The Butterflies of Sikkim Himalaya and Their Natural History. Gangtok, Sikkim, India: Sikkim Nature Conservation Foundation.
- Sakai S., Inaoka S., Toshiaki A., Yamaguchi S., Watanabe Y., (2002) The Parnassiology. The Parnassius Butterflies, A Study in Evolution, Kodansha, Japan. ISBN 4-06-124051-X
- Weiss, J.-C., (1992) Parnassiinae of the World - Part 2, Sciences Nat, Venette, France. ISBN 0-9532240-2-3
