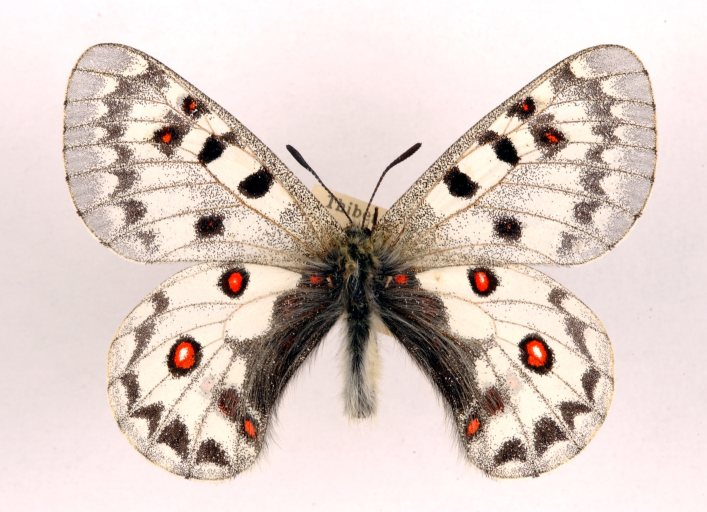
- Subspecies P. j. gartokensis - a paralectotype from the Ulster Museum

Scientific classification
- Kingdom: Animalia
- Phylum: Arthropoda
- Clade: Pancrustacea
- Class: Insecta
- Order: Lepidoptera
- Family: Papilionidae
- Genus: Parnassius
- Species: P. jacquemontii

Binomial name
- Parnassius jacquemontii Boisduval, 1836

Synonyms
- Parnassius jacquemontius

= Parnassius jacquemontii =

Keeled Apollo

Species of butterfly

Parnassius jacquemontii, the keeled Apollo, is a high altitude butterfly which is found in India and Pakistan. It is a member of the snow Apollo genus (Parnassius) of the swallowtail family (Papilionidae). It is also fairly common at high altitudes from Chitral to Kumaon.

== Description ==
Male upperside: pale creamy white; both wings irrorated with diffuse black scales; body, base of the wings and the dorsum of hindwing clothed with long white hairs. Forewing: the irroration of black scales most dense along the costal margin and at base of cell, more sparse on the disc; the apical two thirds of the cell, a portion beyond the middle of interspace 1, and the bases of interspaces 4, 5, 8 and 9 markedly free of the diffuse black scales; a transverse short bar across the middle of cell, another along the discocellulars, and a diffuse transverse series of postdiscal lunules, black; three or four crimson spots encircled with black arranged as follows: one midway in interspace 1, two, sometimes three, beyond apex of cell in an oblique line from the costa; the terminal margin broadly hyaline, with minute black specks at the apices of the veins; cilia white. Hindwing: base and dorsal margin beneath the white hairs densely and broadly irrorated with black scales, the inner edge of this border irregular, rest of the wing with more diffuse black scaling; five or six black-encircled crimson spots as follows: two, sometimes three, obliquely above the tornus, these or one of them occasionally white-centred; one in the middle of interspaces 5 and 7 respectively, these are generally centred with white; and one pure crimson spot at the extreme base of the wing; the postdiscal series of black lunules are as on the forewing, but the lunules are not so well defined and generally separate from one another; finally there is no distinct hyaline border to the wing, but the cream-white scaling extends to the termen; terminal black specks to the veins and white cilia as on the forewing. Underside: shining, with more or less of a glazed appearance; markings much as on the upperside, but indicated as much by those of the upperside which show through as by actual scaling; in addition on the hindwing there is a subbasal transverse series of four dull crimson spots while the crimson spots beyond are all more or less white centred. Antennae deep brownish black, rarely with a few white specks on the underside; head, thorax and abdomen beneath the covering of white hairs, black.

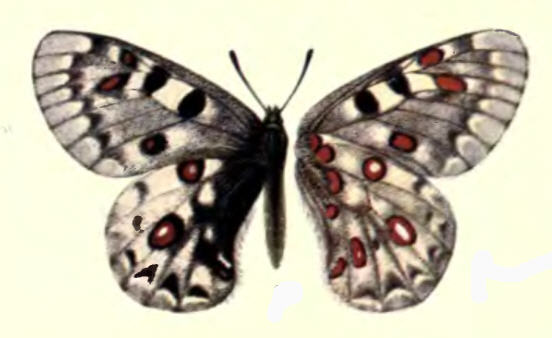
Female

Female. Similar, generally darker with the irroration of black scales more dense; the crimson spots are often larger and more brilliant. Anal pouch after fertilization "ovally scoop-shaped in front, convex beneath," furnished with a sharp high carina posteriorly.

== Range ==
North-eastern Afghanistan, Indus Valley (Pakistan) and (Jammu & Kashmir), Tajikistan (Pamirs), Uzbekistan, South West China and Sichuan.

== Status ==
Not known to be in danger. The nominate subspecies is protected by law in India.

== Taxonomy ==
The Latin specific epithet jacquemontii refers to the French botanist and geologist Victor Jacquemont (1844–1912).

== See also ==
- Papilionidae
- List of butterflies of India
- List of butterflies of India (Papilionidae)

== Other references ==
- Sakai S., Inaoka S., Toshiaki A., Yamaguchi S., Watanabe Y., (2002) The Parnassiology. The Parnassius Butterflies, A Study in Evolution, Kodansha, Japan.
- Weiss J.-C., (2005) Parnassiinae of the World - Part 4, Hillside Books, Canterbury, UK.
