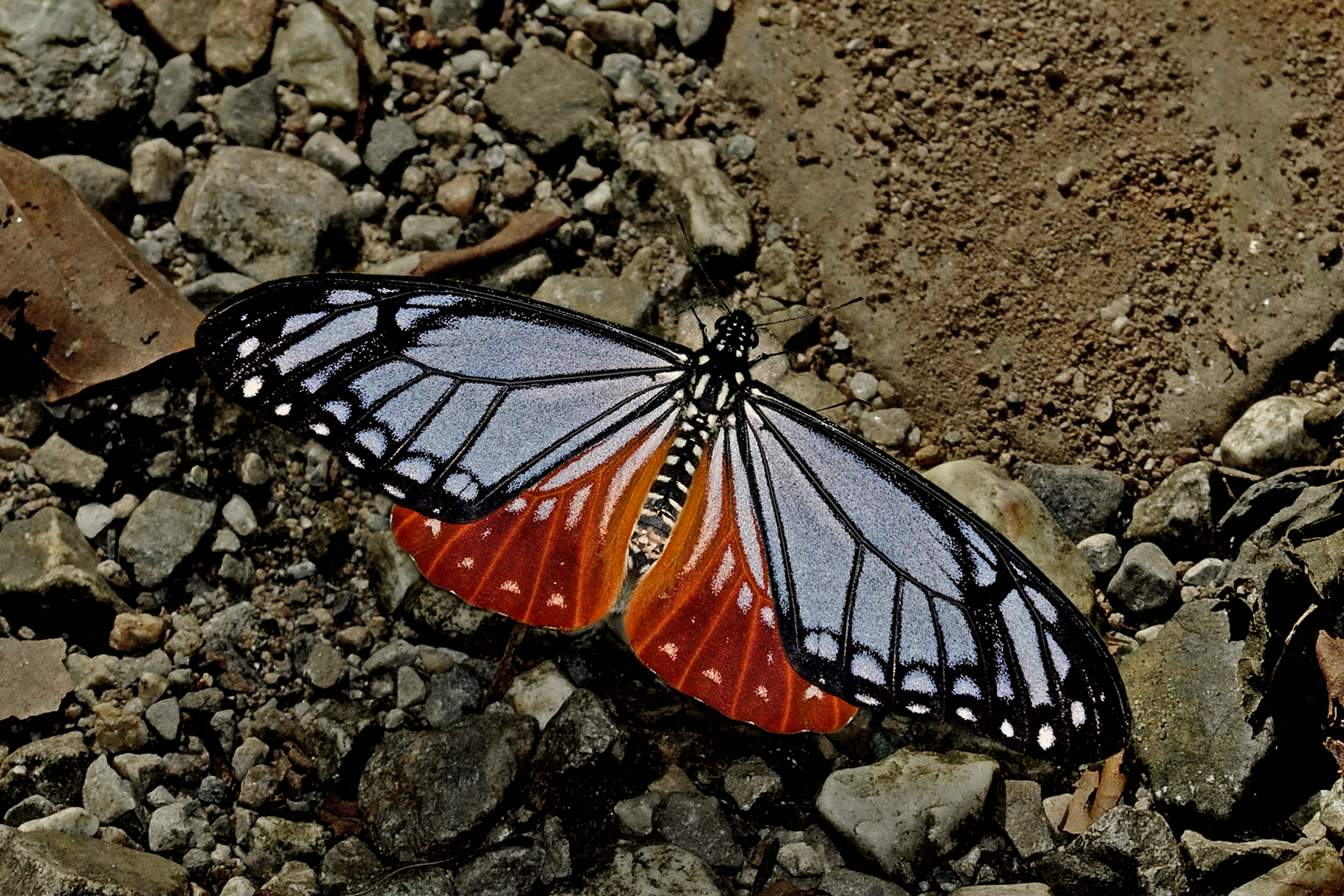

Scientific classification
- Kingdom: Animalia
- Phylum: Arthropoda
- Clade: Pancrustacea
- Class: Insecta
- Order: Lepidoptera
- Family: Papilionidae
- Genus: Papilio
- Species: P. agestor

Binomial name
- Papilio agestor Gray, 1831

Synonyms
- Chilasa agestor

= Papilio agestor =

Tawny mime

Species of butterfly

Papilio (Chilasa) agestor, the tawny mime, is a swallowtail butterfly, native to Indian subcontinent and widely found across Asia. The butterfly belongs to the mime subgenus, Chilasa, of the genus Papilio or the black-bodied swallowtails.

== Description ==
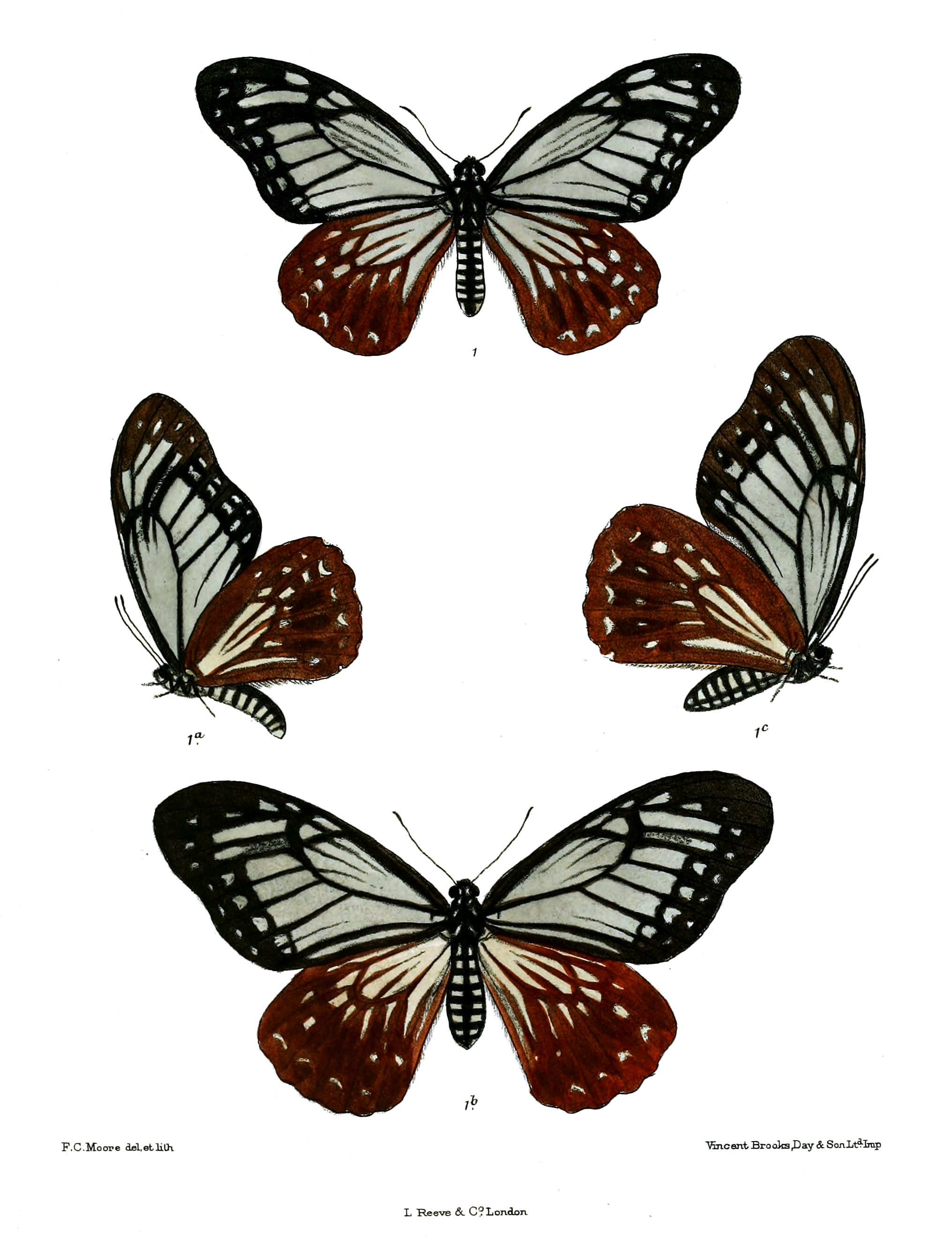
Papilio agestor Assam, 1880

Upperside: forewing black with the following bluish-grey markings: a very slender line along costal margin, a broad streak from base in cell that does not reach the apex of the same, two spots on the black area at apex, a long streak in interspace la; two elongate broad streaks in interspace 1 divided by a slender black ill-defined line; broad rectangular streaks in interspaces 2, 3, 4 and 6; a narrower inwardly obsolescent streak in interspace 5, and elongate spots in interspaces 8, 9, and 10; the streaks in interspaces 1 to 4 crossed transversely near their apices by a line of the ground colour; finally a complete subterminal series of small whitish spots. Hindwing rich chestnut red; cell filled by a trifid bluish - grey streak, followed at the bases of interspaces 2 to 6 by elongate bluish-grey spots; a narrow streak of the same colour from base in interspace 1; a postdiscal series of spots in interspaces 5, 6 and 7 and a more or less obsolescent subterminal series of dots also bluish grey; the veins on the wing conspicuously paler than the ground colour. Underside: forewing similar to the upperside except that the ground colour on the apical area is dull brown not black. Hindwing also as the upperside, but the ground colour on the disc of the wing of a darker deeper shade of chestnut; the postdiscal series of spots more or less obscurely complete from interspace 1 to 7; and the subterminal series of spots of the upperside formed into lunules. Antennae, head, thorax and abdomen black, the head and thorax variegated with bluish-grey spots, the abdomen with lateral transverse bars.

Race govindra, Moore very closely resembles the typical form but can always be distinguished by the presence of a complete series of postdiscal bluish-grey spots on the upperside of the hindwing. It is generally also smaller in both sexes than typical agestor, and on the upperside of the hindwing the ground colour in the anterior interspaces is broadly centred along the middle with very dark brown, almost black. The female frequently has the ground colour of the hindwing a much brighter chestnut (almost ochraceous) than in any specimen of female of agestor that the describer had seen.

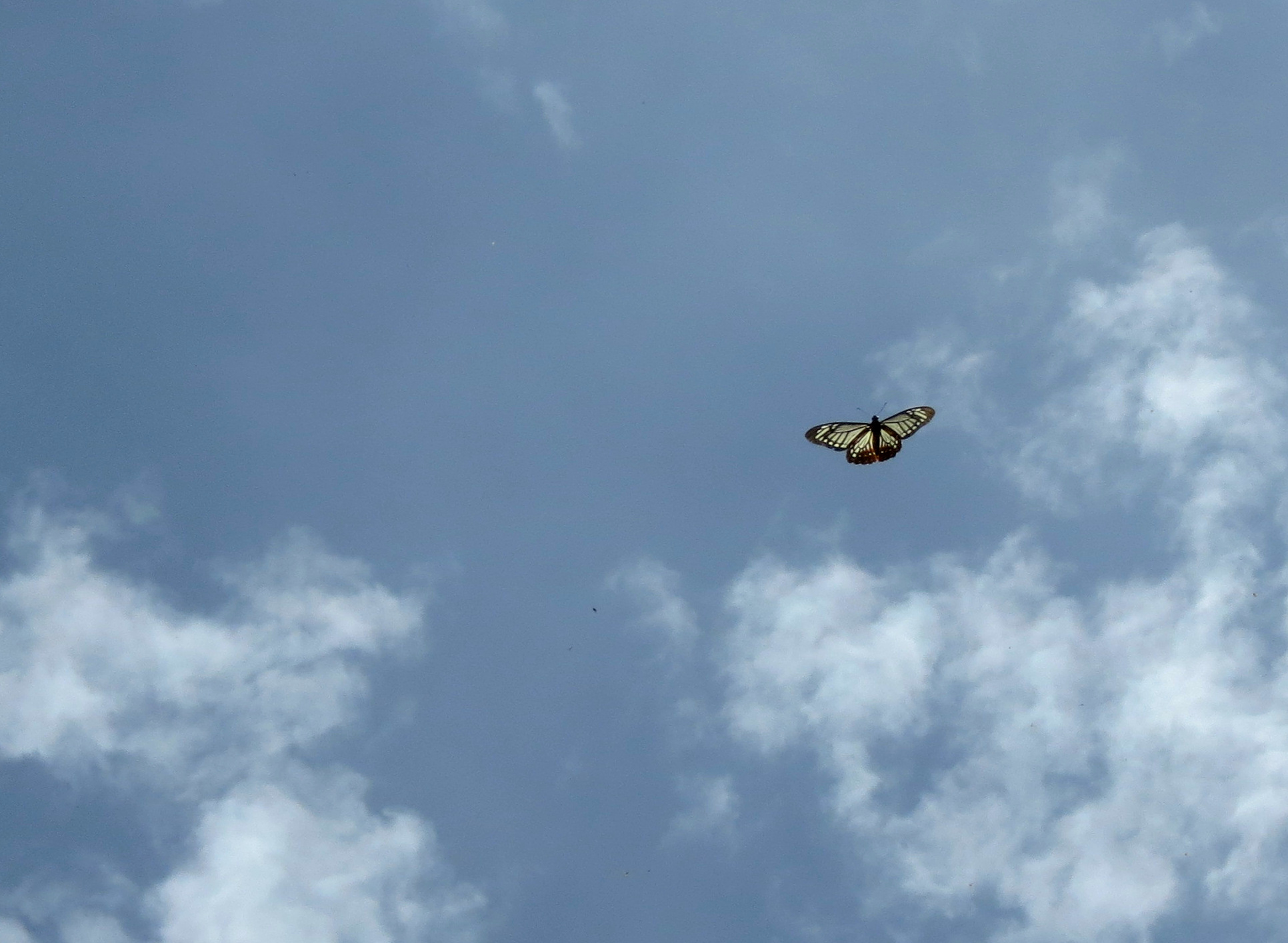
In flight with open wings

== Distribution ==
The butterfly is found in Pakistan from west Kashmir to Sikkim and right across from Assam to Myanmar (including Nepal, Bhutan and Bangladesh), Thailand, Vietnam, Laos, Kampuchea, central and southern China and peninsular Malaysia.

== Status ==
It is never common but is not known to be threatened across most of its range. Extremely local. Considered to be vulnerable in Peninsular Malaysia.

== Habitat ==
This butterfly frequents woods in hilly regions and generally flies between 4,000 and 8,500 feet (1,200 and 2,600 m) in the Himalayas and Assam.

== Mimicry ==
This butterfly may mimic the chestnut tiger butterfly (Parantica sita).

== Habits ==
The tawny mime flies slowly in the sunshine in glades and clearings of oak (Quercus) forests usually 10 to 12 feet (3.0 to 3.7 m) above the ground. It is known to patrol a beat and respond aggressively to passing butterflies and insects for long periods in a locality. It does not visit flowers.

== Life cycle ==
It is single brooded and generally appears in March in Himachal Pradesh.

"The female lays her eggs on the young leaves of Machilus odorattisimus trees, Natural Order Lauraceae, about the end of April. The larva is at first of a reddish colour but very soon turns black and white, and lies on the upper surface of a leaf where it greatly and protectively resembles a bird's droppings."

Adult larva: brown with two subdorsal and two lateral rows of fleshy-pointed tubercles, each with a spot of red at its base; anterior, middle and posterior lateral patches of dull ochraceous, the latter two meeting on the dorsum; the rest of the larva spotted with black and red."

Pupa dark brown with lines of dull ochraceous, roughened, with the anal end truncate." (Described from plate to Mackinnon & de Niceville's paper.)

== Subspecies ==
- Papilio agestor agestor Gray, 1831
- Papilio agestor govindra Moore, 1864
- Papilio agestor matsumurae Fruhstorfer
- Papilio agestor restricta Leech, 1893
- Papilio agestor shirozui (Igarashi, 1979)
- Papilio agestor kuangtungensis (Mell, 1935)

== See also ==
- Papilionidae
- List of butterflies of India
- List of butterflies of India (Papilionidae)

== Other reading ==
- Collins, N. Mark; Morris, Michael G. (1985). Threatened Swallowtail Butterflies of the World: The IUCN Red Data Book. Gland & Cambridge: IUCN. ISBN 978-2-88032-603-6 – via Biodiversity Heritage Library.
- Evans, W.H. (1932). The Identification of Indian Butterflies (2nd ed.). Mumbai, India: Bombay Natural History Society.
- Gay, Thomas; Kehimkar, Isaac David; Punetha, Jagdish Chandra (1992). Common Butterflies of India. Nature Guides. Bombay, India: World Wide Fund for Nature-India by Oxford University Press. ISBN 978-0195631647.
- Haribal, Meena (1992). The Butterflies of Sikkim Himalaya and Their Natural History. Gangtok, Sikkim, India: Sikkim Nature Conservation Foundation.
- Kunte, Krushnamegh (2000). Butterflies of Peninsular India. India, A Lifescape. Hyderabad, India: Universities Press. ISBN 978-8173713545.
- Wynter-Blyth, Mark Alexander (1957). Butterflies of the Indian Region. Bombay, India: Bombay Natural History Society. ISBN 978-8170192329.
