= Curt Eisner =

German entomologist

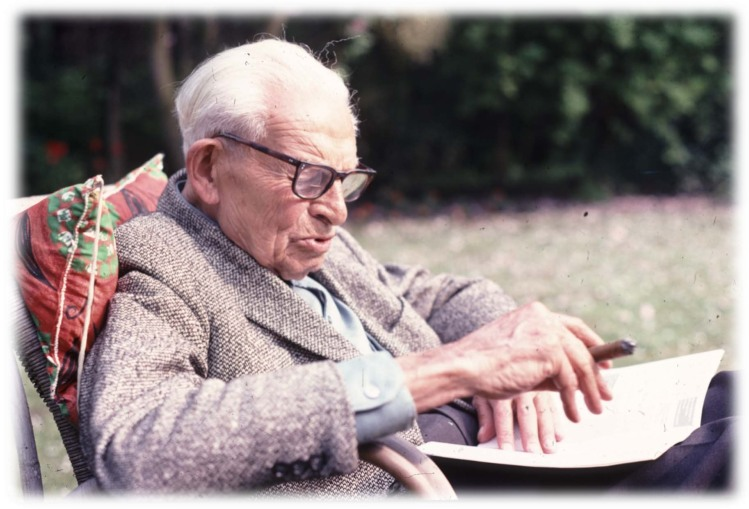
- Curt Eisner in 1974
- Born: April 28, 1890; Zabrze, Germany
- Died: December 30, 1981 (aged 91); The Hague, Netherlands
- Known for: Specialisation in Parnassinae (snow butterflies)
- Notable work: Parnassiana nova series
- Scientific career
- Fields: Entomology

Curt Eisner (April 28, 1890 in Zabrze – December 30, 1981 in The Hague) was a German entomologist who specialised in snow butterflies or Parnassinae. His collections of Parnassinae are in Naturalis, in Leiden, and his Ornithoptera and Morphidae are in the Museum für Naturkunde in Berlin.In the 1930s he lived in Berlin Dahlem.

== Selected works ==
- Parnassiana nova, XII. Kritische Revision der Gattung Parnassius. (Fortsetzung 8). Zoöl. Meded. Leiden 35 (4): 33—49.(1957)
- Parnassiana nova, XV. Kritische Revision der Gattung Parnassius. (Fortsetzung 10). Zoöl. Meded. Leiden 35: 177—203.(1957)
- Parnassiana nova, XXXIII. Nachträgliche Betrachtungen zu der Revision der Subfamilia Parnassiinae. (Fortsetzung 6). Zoöl. Meded. Leiden 38 (17): 281—294, Taf. XXI—XXII.(1963)
- Parnassiana nova XLIX. Die Arten und Unterarten der Baroniidae, Teinopalpidae und Parnassiidae (Lepidoptera). Zool. Verhand. Leiden 135: 1—96.(1974)
- Parnassiidae-Typen in der Sammlung J. C. Eisner Zool.Verh., n° 81, 1966. frontispice couleur, 190 pp., 84 planches N&B hors-texte.
- Obituary of Felix Bryk pdf
- Selected articles by Eisner for the Leiden Museum including the series on Parnassiana nova and Erebia
- Zobodat Full bibliography in Nota Lepidopterologica
