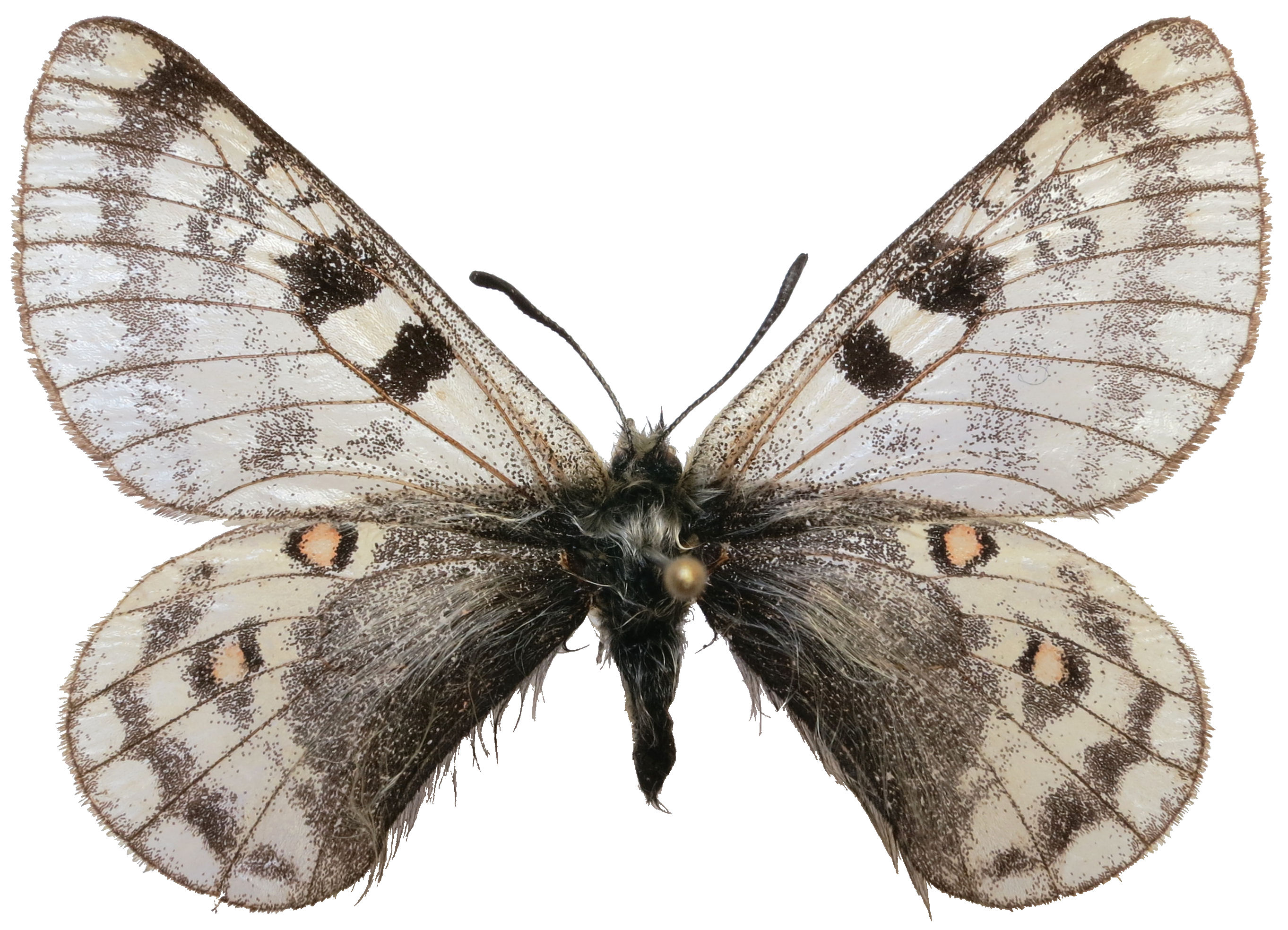

Scientific classification
- Kingdom: Animalia
- Phylum: Arthropoda
- Class: Insecta
- Order: Lepidoptera
- Family: Papilionidae
- Genus: Parnassius
- Species: P. simo

Binomial name
- Parnassius simo Gray, 1853

= Parnassius simo =

Black-edged Apollo

Species of butterfly

Parnassius simo, the black-edged Apollo, is a high-altitude butterfly found in the Himalayas which belongs to the Papilionidae (swallowtail) family.

== Description ==
Male upperside: dull white, the veins black. Forewing at base and along the costal margin lightly irrorated (speckled) with black scales; a black medial transverse bar with even parallel sides across the cell, and a broader black bar on the discocellulars, this latter with a more or less outwardly curved exterior edge; beyond this a bisinuate discal and an outwardly curved postdiscal transverse black band, both extended from the costa to vein 1; the discal band generally more or less obsolescent and ill-defined below veins 3 or 4, but well marked between veins 1 and 2; the outer edge of the postdiscal band with a tendency to be very narrowly continued outwards along the veins; terminal margin dusky subhyaline (almost glass-like) black, bounded by an anteciliary jet-black slender line; cilia dusky black. Hindwing: base and dorsum broadly and heavily shaded with black, sparsely covered with long recumbent white hairs that become fuscous along the extreme edge of the dorsum; the black occupies the basal half of the cell and extends along the lower margin of its apical half to bafie of vein 4, from whence it narrows and is carried obliquely down to near the tornal angle; beyond the cell there are two black-encircled red spots, one in interspace 5, the other in interspace 7; these are followed by a postdiscal, generally complete, curved series of black lunular marks and a narrow terminal dusky-black band, bounded by an anteciliary jet-black line as on the forewing; cilia yellowish white. Underside: with the usual glassy appearance, the markings of the upperside showing through by transparency; the following, however, are marked more or less by actual scaling: the medial and apical black cellular bars on the forewing; the red black-encircled spots on the hindwing, with three additional red spots outwardly margined with black at the base of the same wing, the posterior two of these basal red spots are large and somewhat pear shaped. Antenna, head, thorax and abdomen black; the head above fuscous; beneath: the palpi, thorax and abdomen with dusky fuscous pubescence, mixed on the thorax and abdomen with long white hairs.

Female similar, but in the specimen in the collection of the British Museum marked as the type, on the upperside of the hindwing the red in the discal spot in interspace 5 has disappeared, the same colour in the spot in interspace 7 is reduced to a minute speck, and on the underside the middle red spot of the basal three only is present, much reduced in size. Antennae, head, thorax and abdomen as in the male.

== Range ==
It is known from Kyrgyzstan, Tajikistan, mountainous parts of Pakistan and Kashmir, northern India (including Sikkim), Nepal, western China and Mongolia.

== Status ==
It is not known to be threatened.

== Identification ==
The Parnassius species of butterflies are often hard to identify and can sometimes only be identified by dissection of the genitalia. P. R. Ackery (1975) provides a key available online.

== See also ==
- Papilionidae
- List of butterflies of India
- List of butterflies of India (Papilionidae)

== Other references ==
- Evans, W.H. (1932). The Identification of Indian Butterflies (2nd ed.). Mumbai, India: Bombay Natural History Society.
- Haribal, Meena (1992). The Butterflies of Sikkim Himalaya and Their Natural History. Gangtok, Sikkim, India: Sikkim Nature Conservation Foundation.
- Sakai S., Inaoka S., Toshiaki A., Yamaguchi S., Watanabe Y., (2002) The Parnassiology. The Parnassius Butterflies, A Study in Evolution, Kodansha, Japan. ISBN 4-06-124051-X
- Weiss Jean-Claude, (1999) Parnassiinae of the World, Hillside Books, Canterbury, UK. ISBN 0-9532240-2-3, OCLC 41072974
