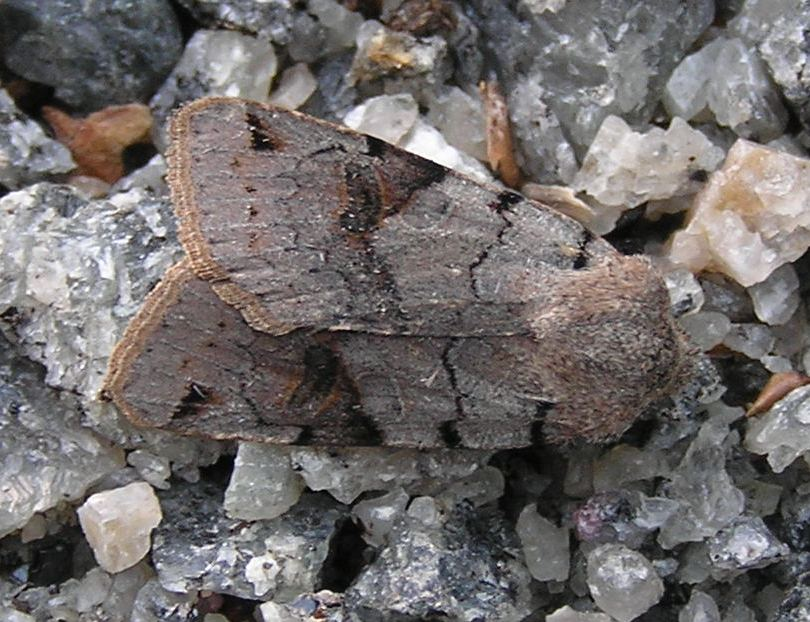

Scientific classification
- Kingdom: Animalia
- Phylum: Arthropoda
- Class: Insecta
- Order: Lepidoptera
- Superfamily: Noctuoidea
- Family: Noctuidae
- Genus: Agrochola
- Species: A. litura

Binomial name
- Agrochola litura (Linnaeus, 1761)

Synonyms
- Phalaena; (Noctua) litura Linnaeus, 1761: Phalaena (Noctua) polluta Esper, 1788; Noctua ornatrix Geyer, 1834

= Agrochola litura =

Brown-spot pinion

Species of moth

Agrochola litura, the brown-spot pinion, is a moth of the family Noctuidae. The species was first described by Carl Linnaeus in 1761. It is found in Europe and the Middle East. It is possibly also present in North Africa, but this is unclear because similar looking species Agrochola meridionalis is found there.

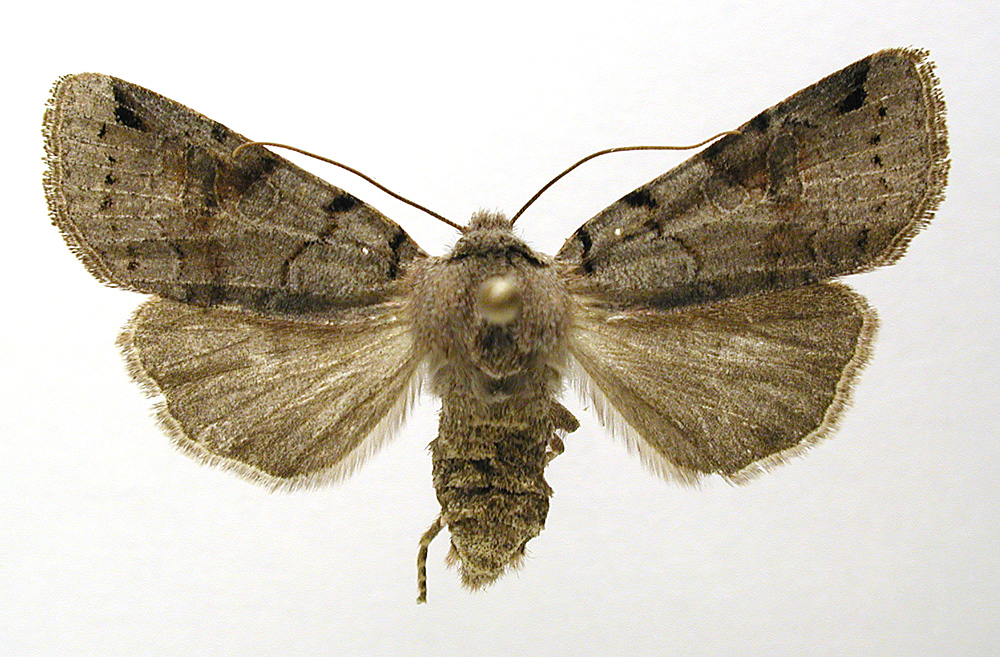
Mounted

== Technical description and variation ==
A. litura L. (37 g). Forewing bluish grey or violet grey, the basal half slightly paler; the lines all marked by black spots on costa, the submarginal with an oblique bar; inner and outer lines dark, obscurely double, with pale centres; stigmata large with pale annuli, the reniform generally with darker centre; hindwing dull fuscous; — polluta Esp. (37 g) is the large dark form; — ornatrix Hbn. (37 h) a small dark form; both with the costal spots well-developed; — borealis Sp.-Schn. (= saturata Schultze) has the basal half of wing prominently pale; — meridionalis Stgr., a Southern race [now full species ], is paler, bluish-grey or yellowish-grey with prominent grey brown or red-brown median shade; — ochreata Spul., from Central Europe, is purplish grey with a yellow tinge, the basal half often whitish ochreous; — in rufa Tutt (37 h) the ground colour is reddish brown instead of purple grey; ab. luteogrisea ab. nov. (37 h), from Amasia, is pale stone colour, with distinct but not prominent markings, the underside paler. Larva grey, brown, or reddish; dorsal line pale, generally with several fine lines close to it;spiracular line white with the lower edge yellow; head brown; thoracic and anal plates dark green with 3 white lines. A. litura L. (37 g). Forewing bluish grey or violet grey, the basal half slightly paler; the lines all marked by black spots on costa, the submarginal with an oblique bar; inner and outer lines dark, obscurely double, with pale centres; stigmata large with pale annuli, the reniform generally with darker centre; hindwing dull fuscous; — polluta Esp. (37 g) is the large dark form; — ornatrix Hbn. (37 h) a small dark form; both with the costal spots well-developed; — borealis Sp.-Schn. (= saturata Schultze) has the basal half of wing prominently pale; — meridionalis Stgr., a Southern race [now full species ], is paler, bluish-grey or yellowish-grey with prominent grey brown or red-brown median shade; — ochreata Spul., from Central Europe, is purplish grey with a yellow tinge, the basal half often whitish ochreous; — in rufa Tutt (37 h) the ground colour is reddish brown instead of purple grey; ab. luteogrisea ab. nov. (37 h), from Amasia, is pale stone colour, with distinct but not prominent markings, the underside paler. Larva grey, brown, or reddish; dorsal line pale, generally with several fine lines close to it;spiracular line white with the lower edge yellow; head brown; thoracic and anal plates dark green with 3 white lines. The wingspan is 38–35 mm.

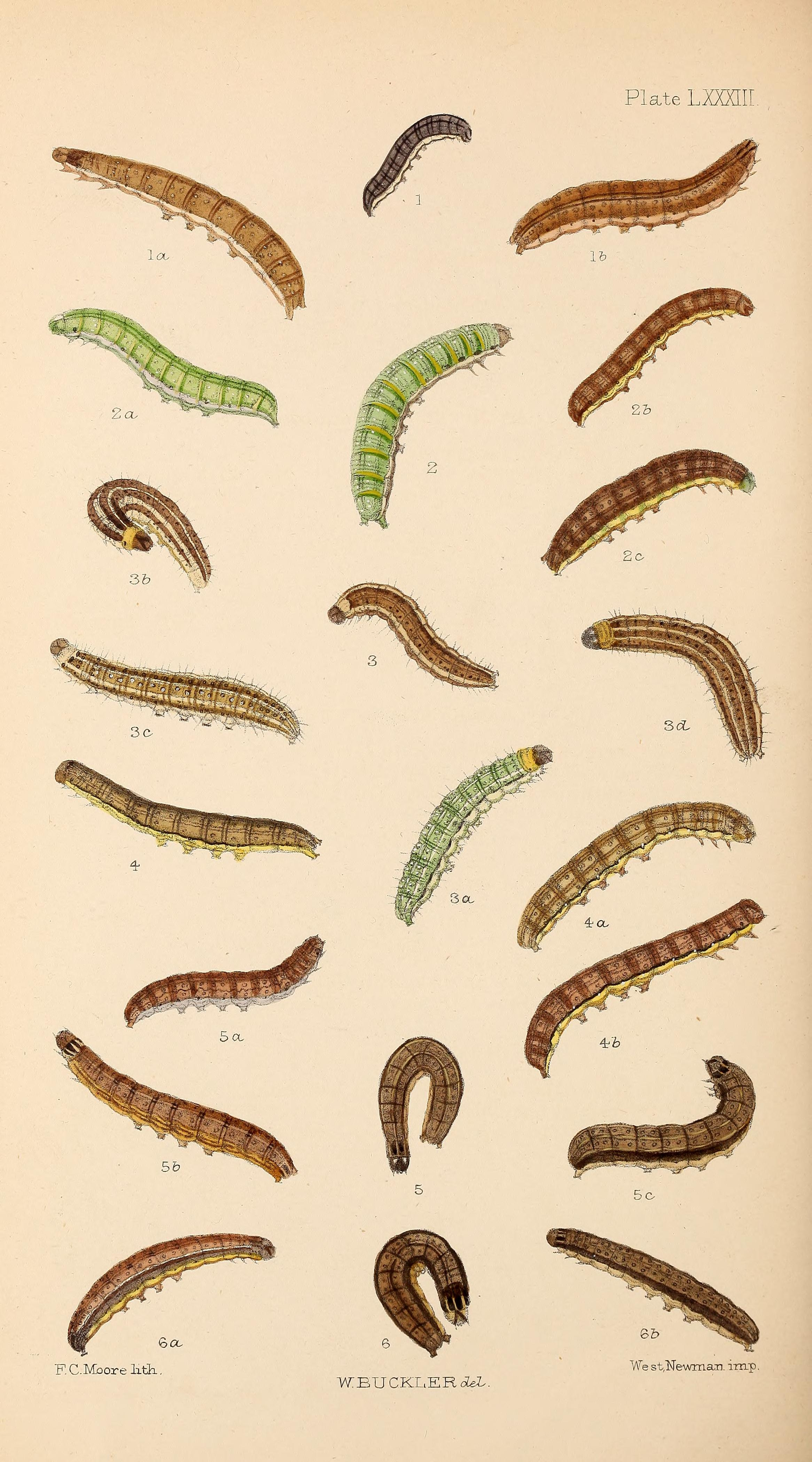
Figs. 4, 4a, 4b larva after last moult

== Biology ==
The moth flies from September to October depending on the location.

The larvae feed on various herbaceous plants and deciduous trees. Recorded food plants include Rumex longifolius, Corydalis nobilis, Sedum telephium, Filipendula vulgaris and Lamium album.
