= Sjupp =

Carl Linnaeus's pet raccoon

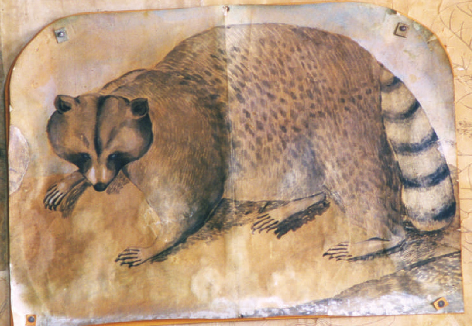
- Illustration of Sjupp
- Species: Raccoon
- Born: New Sweden
- Died: 1747; Linnaean Garden, Uppsala, Sweden
- Owners: Carl Linnaeus (originally Adolf Fredrik)
- Residence: A small zoo in the Royal Gardens, Stockholm (until 1746); Linnaean Garden, Uppsala (1746, until death)

Sjupp was a raccoon kept as a pet by Adolf Frederick and later by Swedish biologist Carl Linnaeus. Sjupp was the first of many exotic animals that Linnaeus collected to put on display in Uppsala University's Botanical Garden.

Sjupp was presumably taken from the colony of New Sweden. Although Linnaeus kept most of his animals in the garden, Sjupp lived with Linnaeus in his house.

Linnaeus recorded careful observations of Sjupp's behavior. According to Linnaeus, Sjupp liked eggs, almonds, raisins, cakes, sugar and various fruits. Sometimes he would capture food from the pockets of Linnaeus' students. He hated sour foods such as vinegar. He was very friendly to people he knew, but would be cruel to people he hated. Linnaeus' gardener once had a conflict with him, and Sjupp would scream every time he smelled him.

Linnaeus had, in 1740, classified raccoons with bears as a species in the genus Ursus. He also described Sjupp as a bear. In 1747, Sjupp died in a fight with a dog after escaping the garden. Linnaeus dissected Sjupp's body and published a description of Sjupp in the proceedings of the Royal Swedish Academy of Sciences. The description of raccoon in Systema Naturae was based partly on the observations and dissection of Sjupp. Linnaeus also hung a painting of Sjupp in his summerhouse.
