= Swedish Linnaeus Society =

The Swedish Linnaeus Society (Swedish Svenska Linnésällskapet) is a Swedish learned society devoted to the study of the 18th century naturalist Carl Linnaeus. It was founded at a meeting taking place at Hammarby, the country house of Linnaeus outside Uppsala, on May 23, 1917, the 210th birthday of Carl Linnaeus. In 1918 it took over the old botanical garden in Uppsala, Linnaean Garden, and from 1918 until 1923 restored it according to Linnaeus' own plans and specifications in his published work Hortus Upsaliensis from 1745. The care for the garden was taken over by Uppsala University in 1977. The society still runs the Linnaeus Museum in the 17th-century house adjacent to the garden, where Linnaeus once lived.

The yearbook of the society, Svenska Linnésällskapets Årsskrift, has been published since 1918. In addition, it has republished some of Linnaeus's own publications. In cooperation with, among others, the Royal Swedish Academy of Sciences, Uppsala University and the Linnean Society of London, the society is involved in the digital publication of the correspondence of Linnaeus.

== See also ==
- Linnean Society of London
