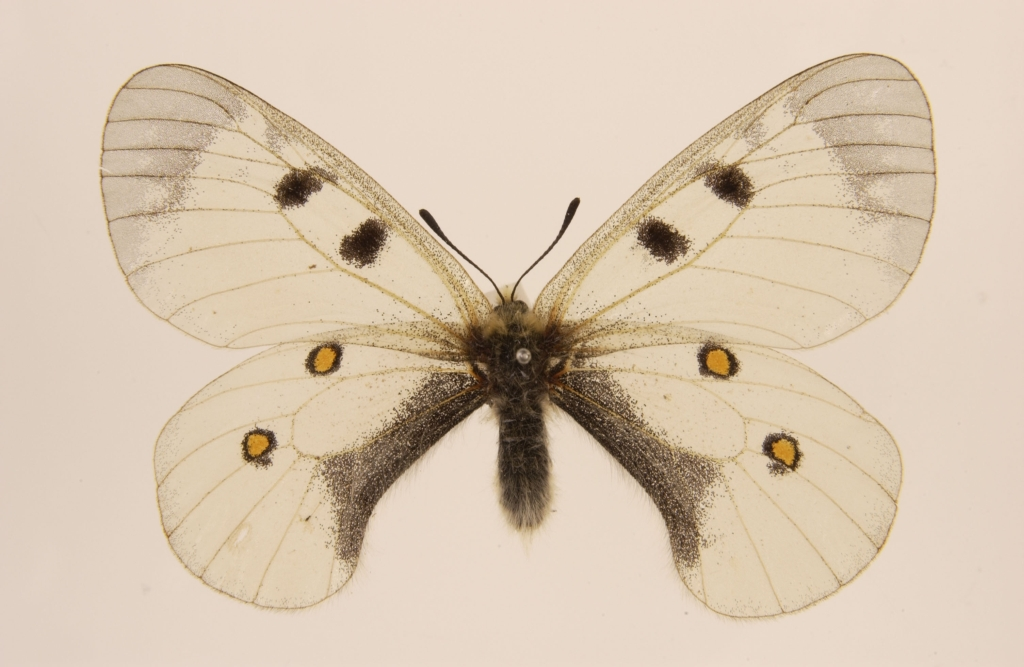

Scientific classification
- Domain: Eukaryota
- Kingdom: Animalia
- Phylum: Arthropoda
- Class: Insecta
- Order: Lepidoptera
- Family: Papilionidae
- Genus: Parnassius
- Species: P. nordmanni

Binomial name
- Parnassius nordmanni Ménétries, in Simashko 1850

= Parnassius nordmanni =

Species of butterfly

Parnassius nordmanni is a high altitude butterfly which is found the Caucasus. It is a member of the snow Apollo genus (Parnassius) of the swallowtail family, Papilionidae. The larva feeds on Corydalis species including C. alpestris, C. conorhiza and C. emanueli.

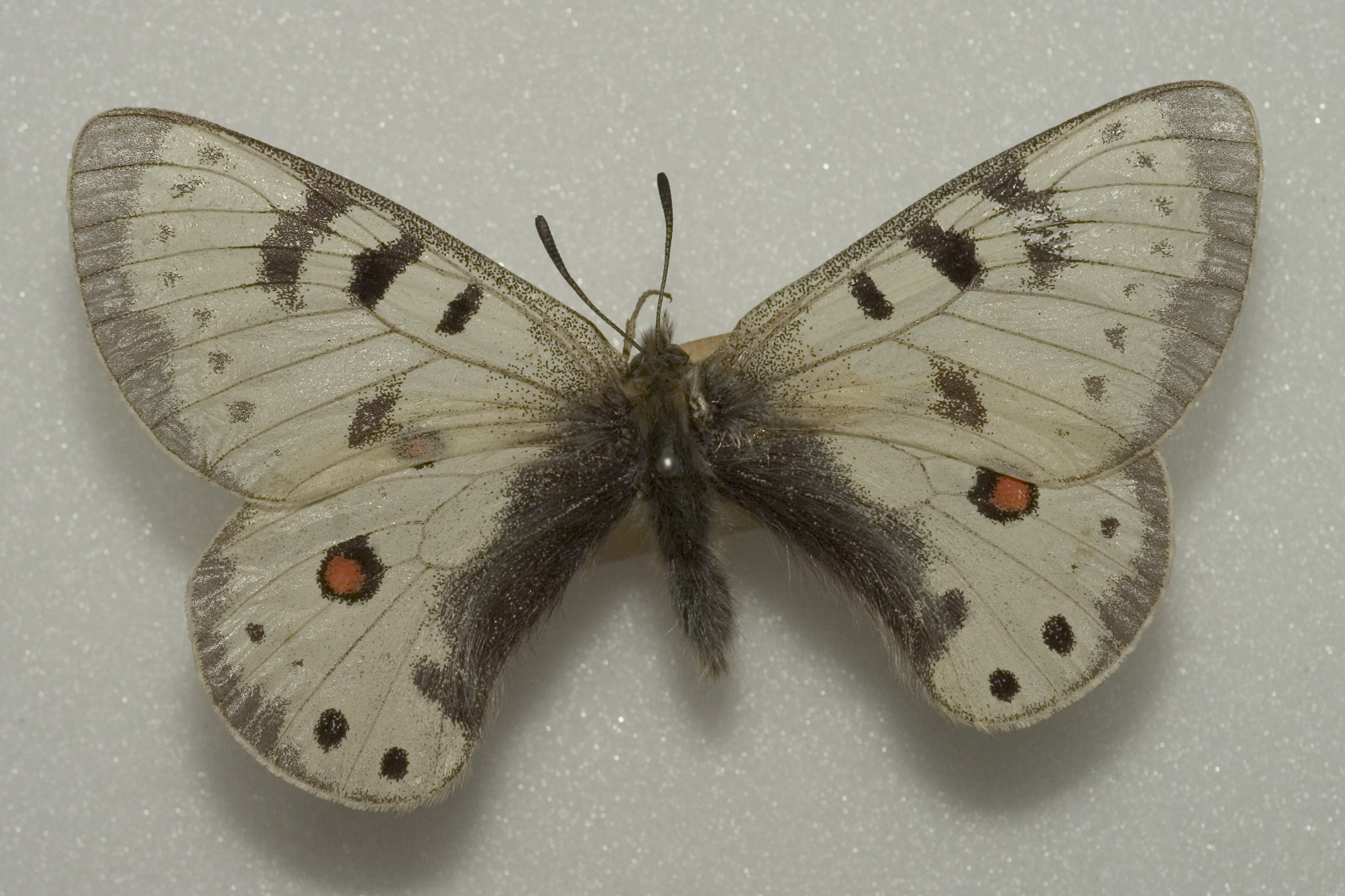
In the Hindu Kush

== Description ==
Similar to Parnassius ariadne but the forewing without submarginal macular band, the vitreous margin is considerably widened, there being often a blackish spot before the hindmargin; ocelli of hindwing reddish yellow, distal margin glossy grey. The female strongly marked, partly powdered with blackish scaling; costal spot of forewing enlarged to an abbreviated band; the ocelli of the hindwing sometimes connected by a black line. Underside without basal spots. In ab. trimaculata Schaposchn. the anal spot bears sometimes a distinct red pupil, being ocellus-like.

== Subspecies ==
The taxa described within this species are most probably only infrasubspeciflc varieties.

- Parnassius nordmanni bogosi (Bang-Haas, 1934)
- Parnassius nordmanni christophi (Bryk & Eisner, 1932)
- Parnassius nordmanni pataraeus (Westwood, 1852)
- Parnassius nordmanni thomai (de Freina, 1980)
- Parnassius nordmanni trimaculata (Schaposchnikow, 1904)

== Type locality ==
The type locality is “Monti / Adschara” (by lectotype designation).
