= Botanical Garden of Uppsala University =

- Botaniska trädgården
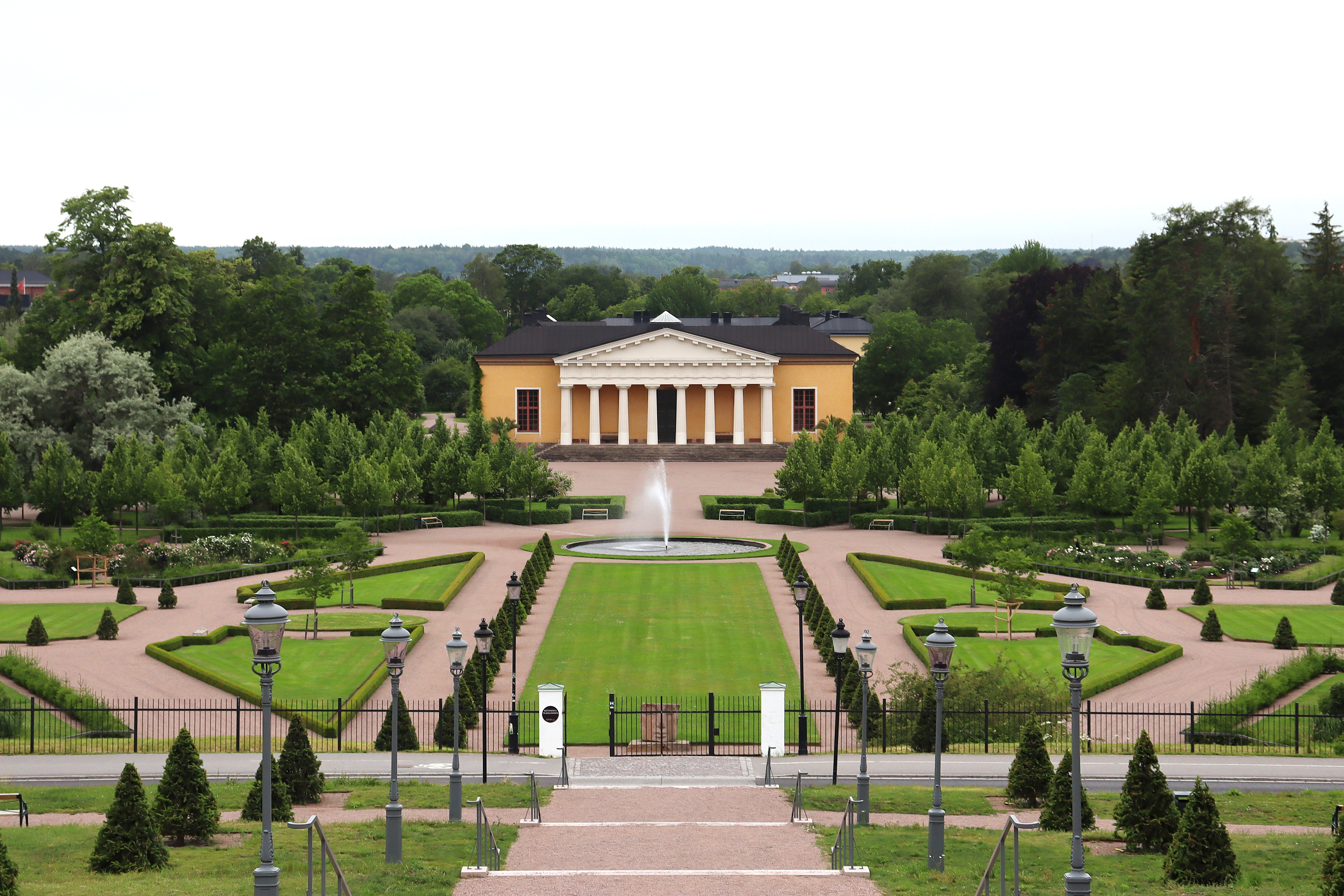
- The baroque garden of the Botanical Garden, as seen from the steps of Uppsala Castle. The building in the background is the garden's orangery.

- Location within Uppsala Location within Sweden
- Type: Botanical garden
- Coordinates: 59°51′9″N 17°37′45″E
- Established: 1655 (original site) 1787 (current site)
- Founder: Olaus Rudbeck (original site) Carl Peter Thunberg (current site)
- Designer: Olaus Rudbeck (original site) Carl Hårleman (current site)
- Operator: Uppsala University
- Species: Over 7000 as of 2025
- Website: Official website

The Botanical Garden of Uppsala University (Swedish: Botaniska trädgården) is the principal botanical garden in the city of Uppsala, Sweden. It is situated near to Uppsala Castle and belongs to Uppsala University, having been created on land donated to the university by King Gustav III in 1787; it is now open to the public alongside the university's other botanical gardens, the Linnaean Garden and Linnaeus Hammarby, as well with a museum on site. The original Botanical Garden was founded in 1655 by Olaus Rudbeck, making it the oldest botanical garden in Sweden. Having been damaged in the 1702 Uppsala fire, it fell into neglect before it was redesigned and renovated by Carl Linnaeus, a professor at the university. Under the leadership of Linnaeus, the garden's collection grew massively and it became one of the most prominent botanical gardens in the world. The original site is maintained by Uppsala University to Linnaeus' recorded design to this day.

Carl Peter Thunberg approached the King Gustav III of Sweden, requesting to move the gardens to a better location on royal land. Gustav III took interest and bestowed land and funds to the construction of the new gardens, and after his death the rate of construction slowed significantly, with a new orangery made to house various species opening in 1802. Gustav IV Adolf donated a large number of living and dead animals to the garden's collection, including a live lion that was housed in the orangery. Throughout the 19th century, the garden shifted from a site of university education and research to one of public education and recreation; it has been receiving public funds for its upkeep since the late 19th century, and is a popular location for visitors to Uppsala today.

== Original site ==
Carl Linnaeus (1707–1778), painted in 1775

While botanical gardens are today defined as "containing scientifically ordered and maintained collections of plants" and "open to the public for the purposes of recreation, education and research", early botanical gardens instead focussed more on the education of physicians and their supplies of medicine, similarly to physic gardens in medieval monasteries. Medical training would remain the primary purpose of universities' botanical gardens throughout the seventeenth and eighteenth centuries.

The University of Uppsala's first botanical garden—and the first botanical garden in Sweden—was situated on Svartbäcksgatan. It was founded in 1655 by Olaus Rudbeck the Elder, and by the end of the 17th century the collection had grown to approximately 1800 different species. In 1702, Uppsala was largely destroyed in a fire, which caused serious damage to the garden; due to the absence of the necessary funds, the garden was not repaired for nearly forty years.

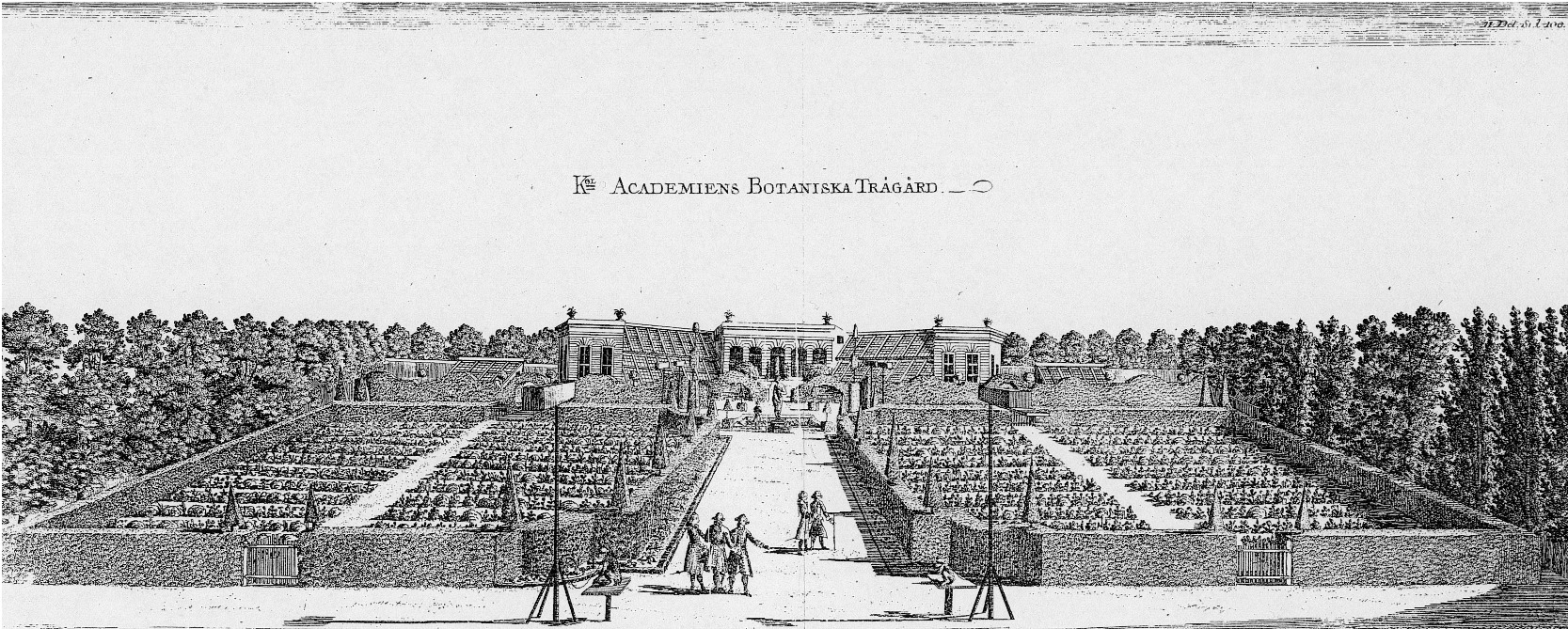
The Linnaean Garden as shown in a 1770 engraving

It was at the Botanical Gardens—by that time completely neglected—in the spring of 1729, that Carl Linnaeus convinced Olof Celsius that he was skilled in botany, earning his financial support and mentoring. By May 1741, Linnaeus, who had originally been a student of Rudbeck, had become a professor at the university, which made him responsible for both teaching its students and maintaining its botanical garden. Linnaeus improved and rearranged the garden based upon his own ideas, which he documented in his 1748 work Hortus Upsaliensis (English: The Garden of Uppsala). In the book, Linnaeus claims to have invented the Celsius scale of temperature and installed it in the Botanical Garden's orangery.

It was under Linnaeus that the Botanical Garden would grow to 3,000 species and become one of the most prominent gardens of its time. Although the main botanical garden since moved to a new site after Linnaeus' death, the gardens of the former site have remained under the ownership and control of Uppsala University. Now known as the "Linnaean Garden", it is maintained identically to how Linnaeus described its organisation in 1745.

== Current site ==
=== 1778–1856: Construction and expansion ===
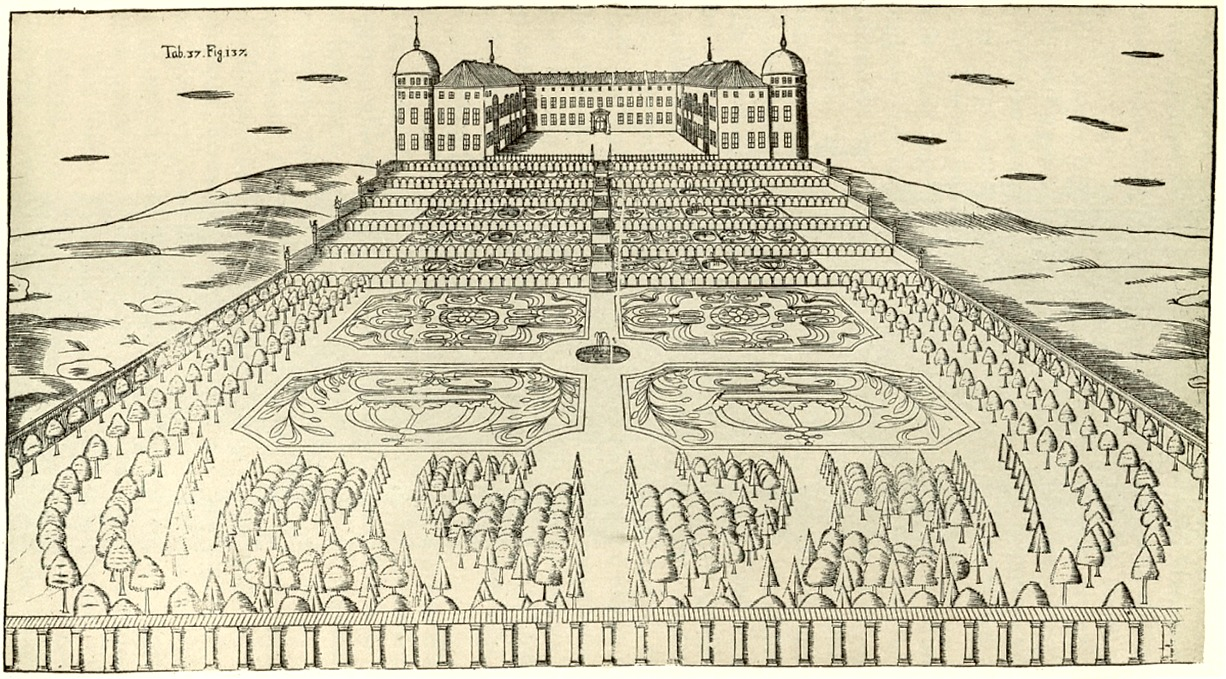
Uppsala Castle and its formal garden in 1675

After the death of Linnaeus in 1778, his student and successor Carl Peter Thunberg (1743–1828) became dissatisfied with the Linnaean Garden. Its location, near the river Fyris, meant the soil was too wet for many species of plants. Thunberg approached Gustav III—whose castle in Uppsala stood upon much higher ground—to request the use of the large formal garden on the site for the University of Uppsala's botanical gardens; the garden had been designed by architect Carl Hårleman in the style of Baroque architecture, and was laid out in 1744. Not only did Gustav III agree to gift the requested land to the university, but he gave them another plot south of Norbyvägen to build the gardens and paid the cost of landscaping the area for its new purpose.

In 1693 Olof Rudbeck the Younger, the professor of Medicine at Uppsala University, had built a house on the site which would become the gardens. Upon his becoming the Director of Medicine and Botany in 1741, Linnaeus was offered the house as a family home, but he criticised it as "more like a robbers’ den or an owls’ nest" and refused to move in before it was renovated. The house was completely rebuilt and in 1743 he moved in. After his death the building would be used as a house for other university staff until 1935, its most notable inhabitant being its last, the musician Hugo Alfvén.

The official grant for the garden was signed on 17 August 1787 by Gustav III; the same day, 128 cannons were fired to celebrate the occasion and Gustav III laid the foundation stone for the garden's observatory (Swedish: Orangeriet). The orangery was built to contain a full set of Swedish coins as well as medals which depicted Gustav III, Crown Prince Gustav Adolf (later King Gustav IV Adolf), and Carl Linnaeus. After the death of Gustav III in 1792, funds for work on the garden and the orangery diminished which made work more difficult; in spite of this, the orangery finally opened on 25 May 1807, the centenary of Linnaeus' birth.

Around the start of the nineteenth century the purpose of botanical gardens, such as the one in Uppsala, started to shift from medicinal uses to research centres and museums. Linnaeus himself had a menagerie—a term for a collection of exotic animals in captivity—which he stored in the Linnaean Garden, from which he displayed animals such as a tame raccoon named Sjupp and six monkeys, which lived in small huts on top of poles. In 1802, Gustav IV Adolf gifted a large number of items originally belonging to his grandmother Queen Louisa Ulrika of Sweden, herself an important patron to Linnaeus. Gustav IV Adolf also gifted a live lion to the collection, which was housed in the orangery, but did not thrive in captivity. The University of Uppsala continued to display its zoological collections in the orangery until 1856 when it moved them to the Gustavianum, a different building belonging to the university.

=== 1857–present: Modern history ===
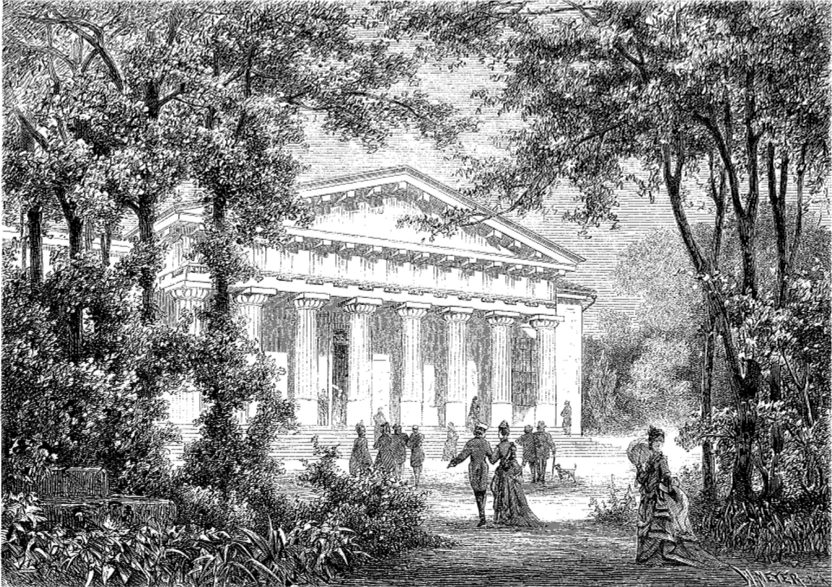
1874 drawing of the Orangery by Carl Svante Hallbeck

The functions of the Botanical Garden as a part of the university's teaching resources and research facilities has remained, but it has also expanded to include public education and recreation, a trend seen across botanical gardens during the nineteenth century. In return for this, the Botanical Garden has received substantial amounts of public money since before 1897, and in 1935, the garden and orangery building were designated as national monuments.

In 1937, the former home of Linnaeus on the site was renovated by the Swedish Linnaeus Society into a museum celebrating his work and exploring what his life would have been like. They began by making the museum in the orangery building until the house could be suitably renovated, and it officially opened on 30 May 1937. The museum was named the Linnaeus Museum (Swedish: Linnémuseet) and it contains a range of scientific and domestic objects from Linnaeus' lifetime, primarily objects that belonged to him or that he collected. It is also home to a portrait of him painted by Gustaf Lundberg in 1753.

In 1930, tropical greenhouses were added to the Botanical Garden, followed by a restoration program in the 1970s that returned the garden to its original design by Hårleman. The modern gardens also contains a section of artificial rainforest, and has hosted temporary summer exhibitions such as Flying Seeds in 2022, which contained the work of six landscapers from Hokkaido, Japan. The choice of the landscapers' origin celebrated the connection between Japan and Rudbeck, who had written the first book describing the country's flora while travelling there.

Alongside the Botanical Garden, the University maintains two satellite botanical gardens: the Linnaean Garden (Swedish: Linnéträdgården), created in 1655 by Olaus Rudbeck; and Linnaeus's Hammarby (Swedish: Linnés Hammarby), Carl Linnaeus' summer home for his family. As of 2011, the University of Uppsala allows access by the public to all three of the gardens. As of 2025, the modern Botanical Garden is home to over 7000 species of plants, and it is because of the Botanical Garden's extensive grounds, orangery, tropical greenhouses, and baroque garden that the site attracts more than 100,000 visitors every year.

== Gallery ==
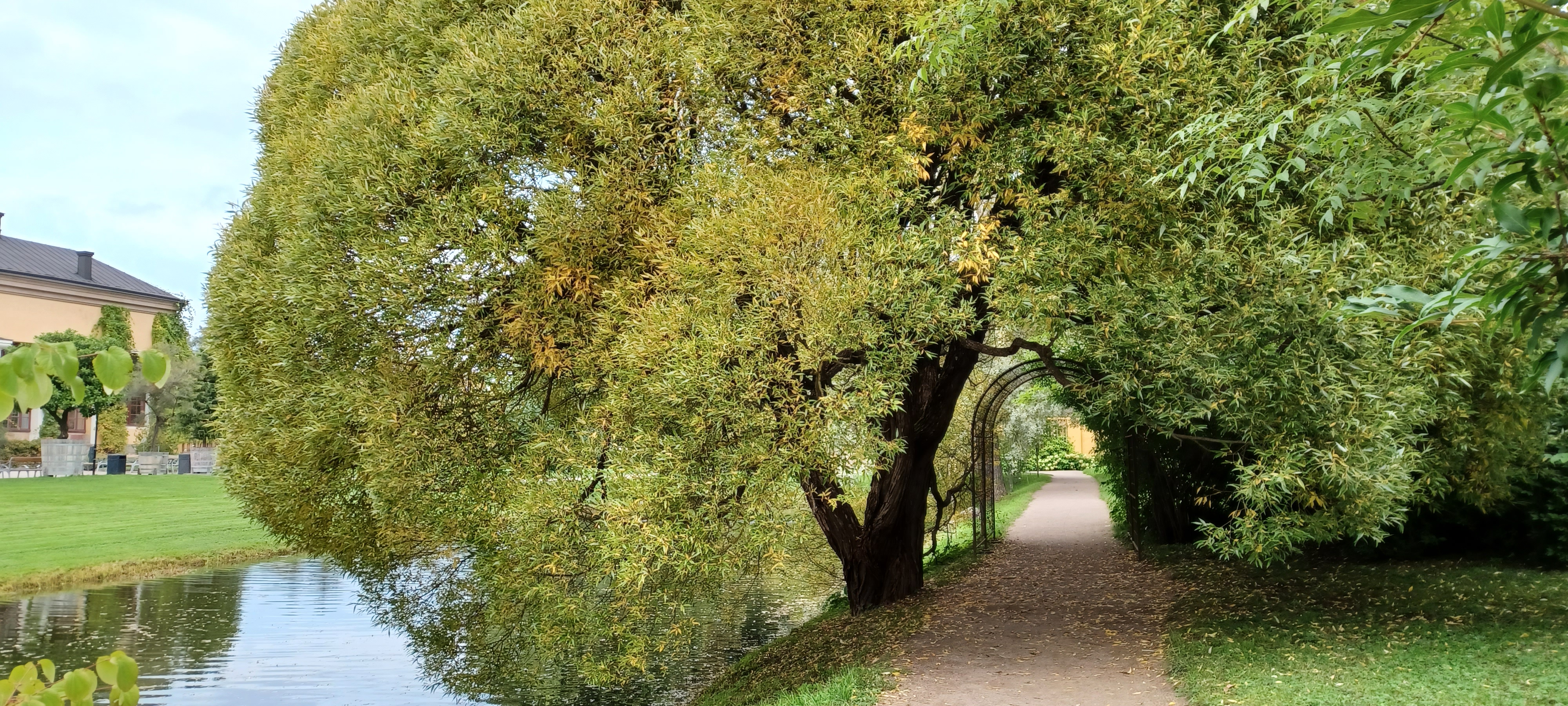
A secluded pathway with red lily pond, the Linnaeum in the distance

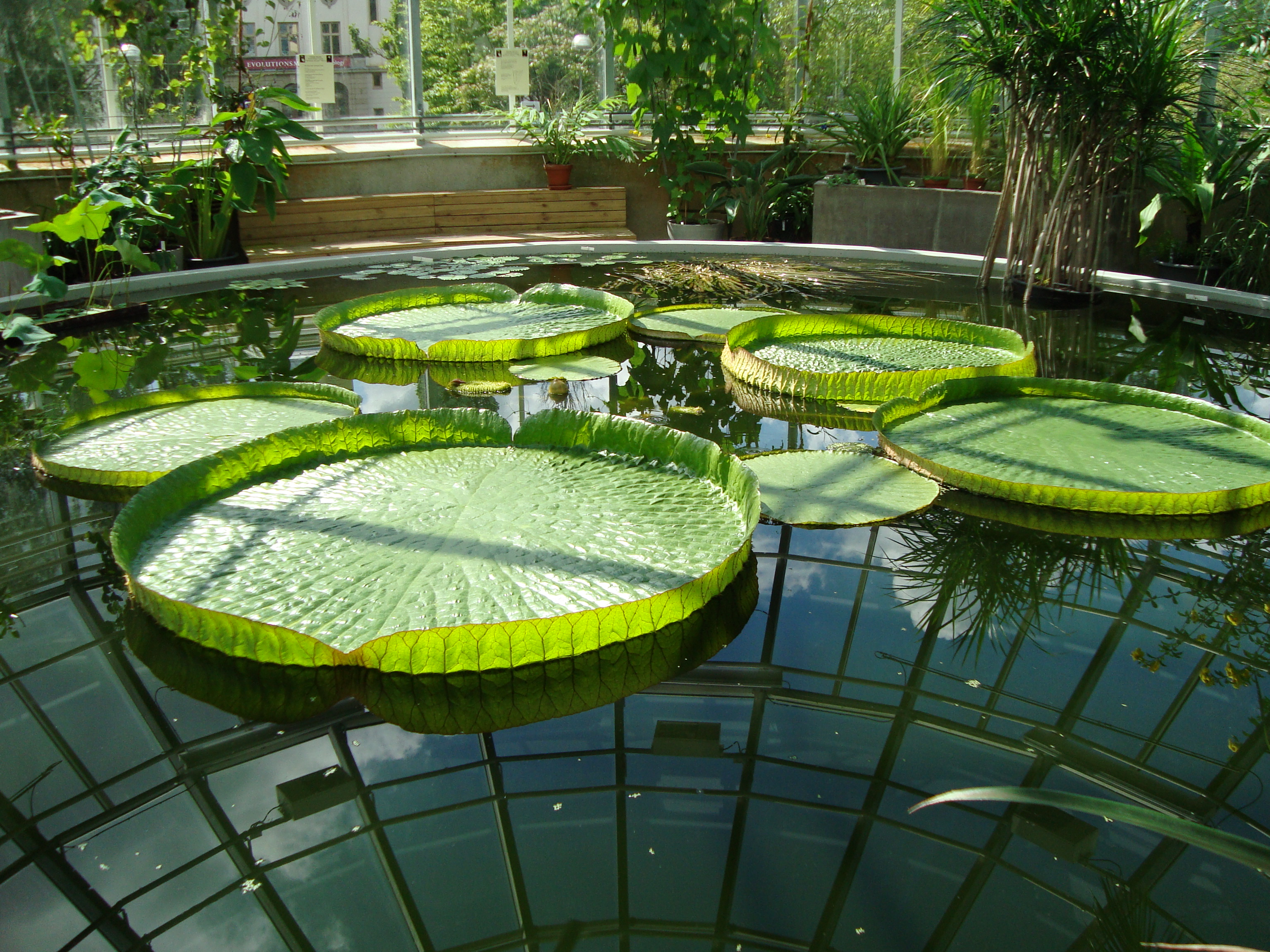
Waterlilies in a tropical greenhouse

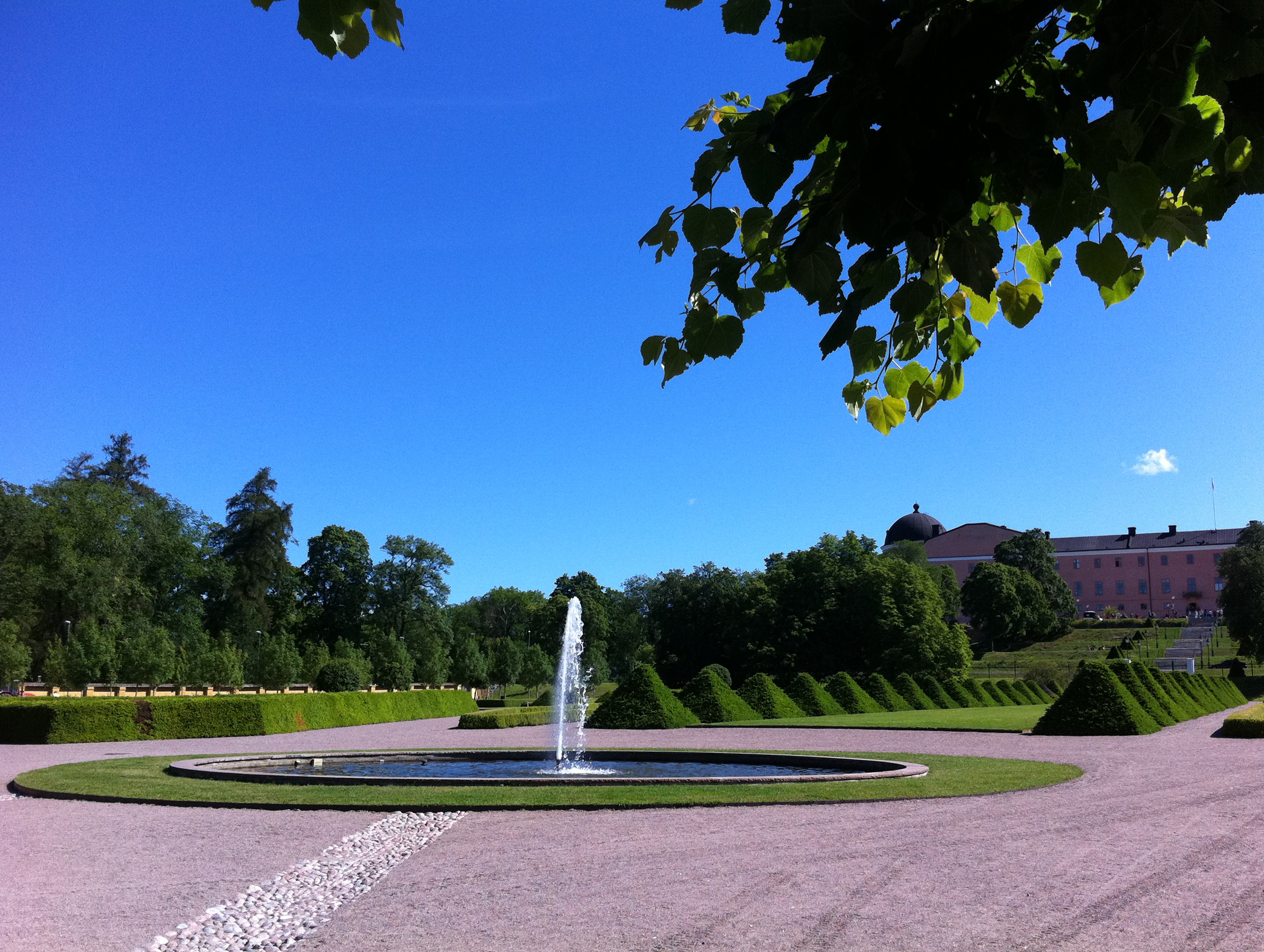
Baroque garden with Uppsala Castle in background

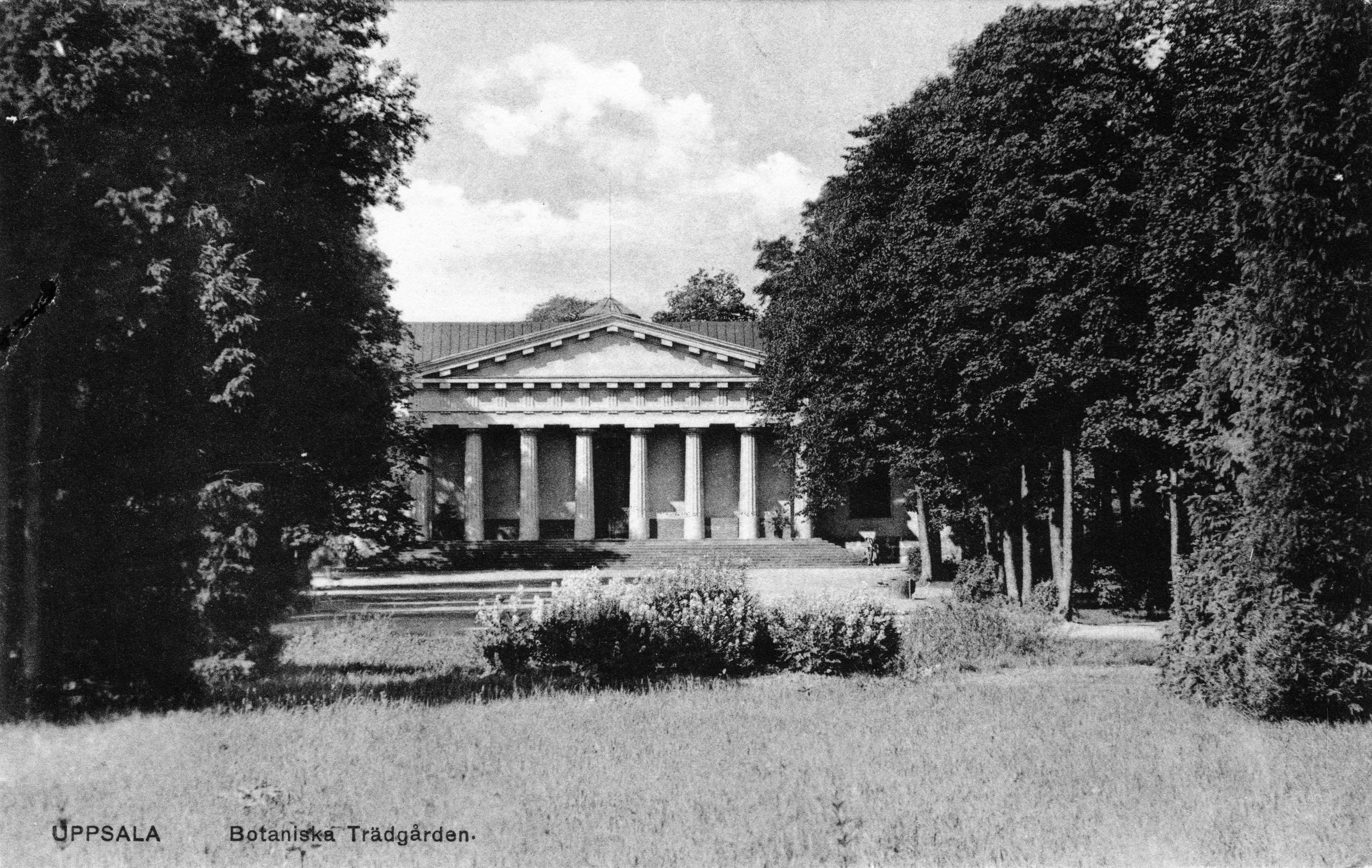
A 1915 photograph of the orangery

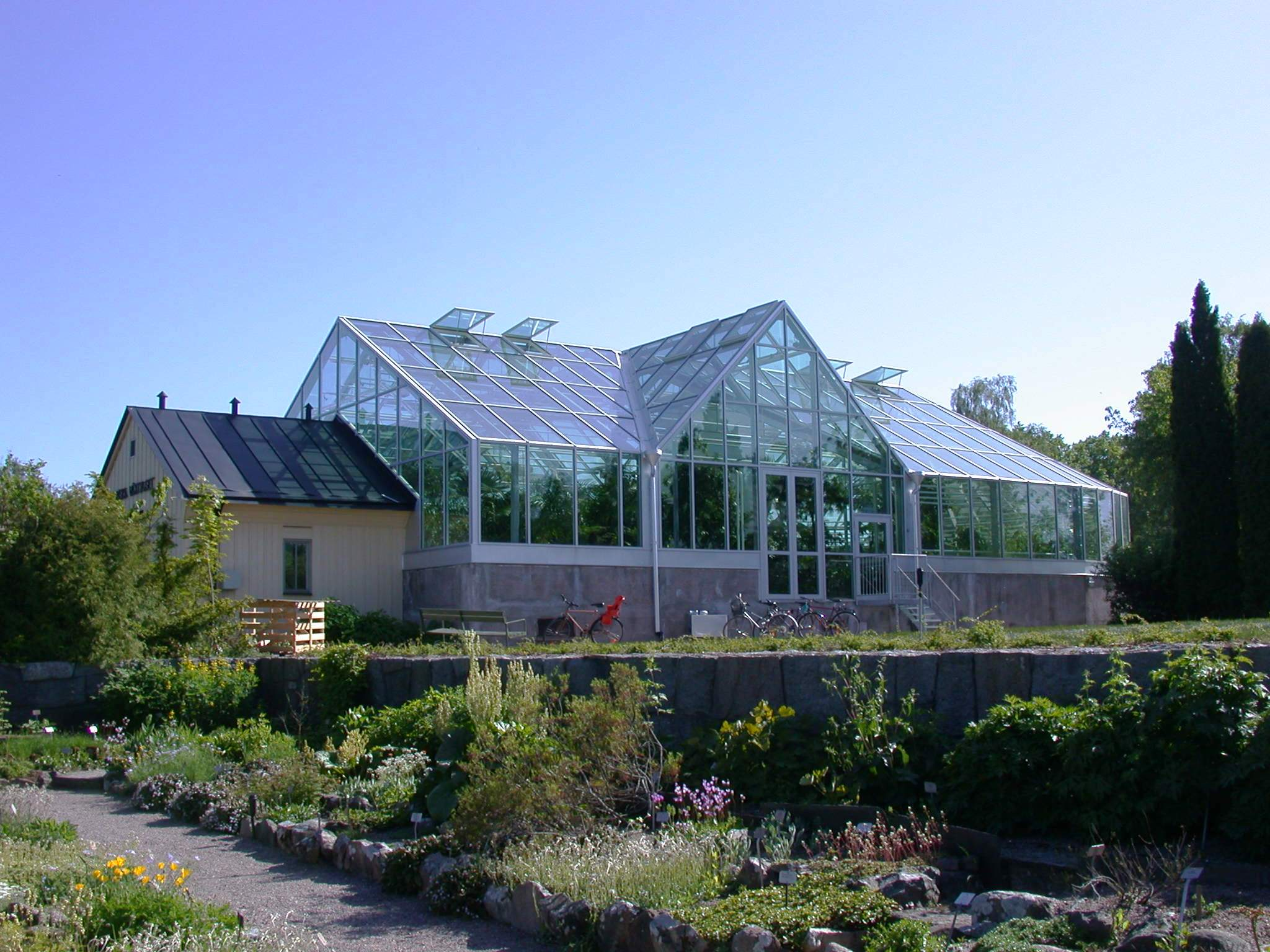
One of the tropical greenhouses

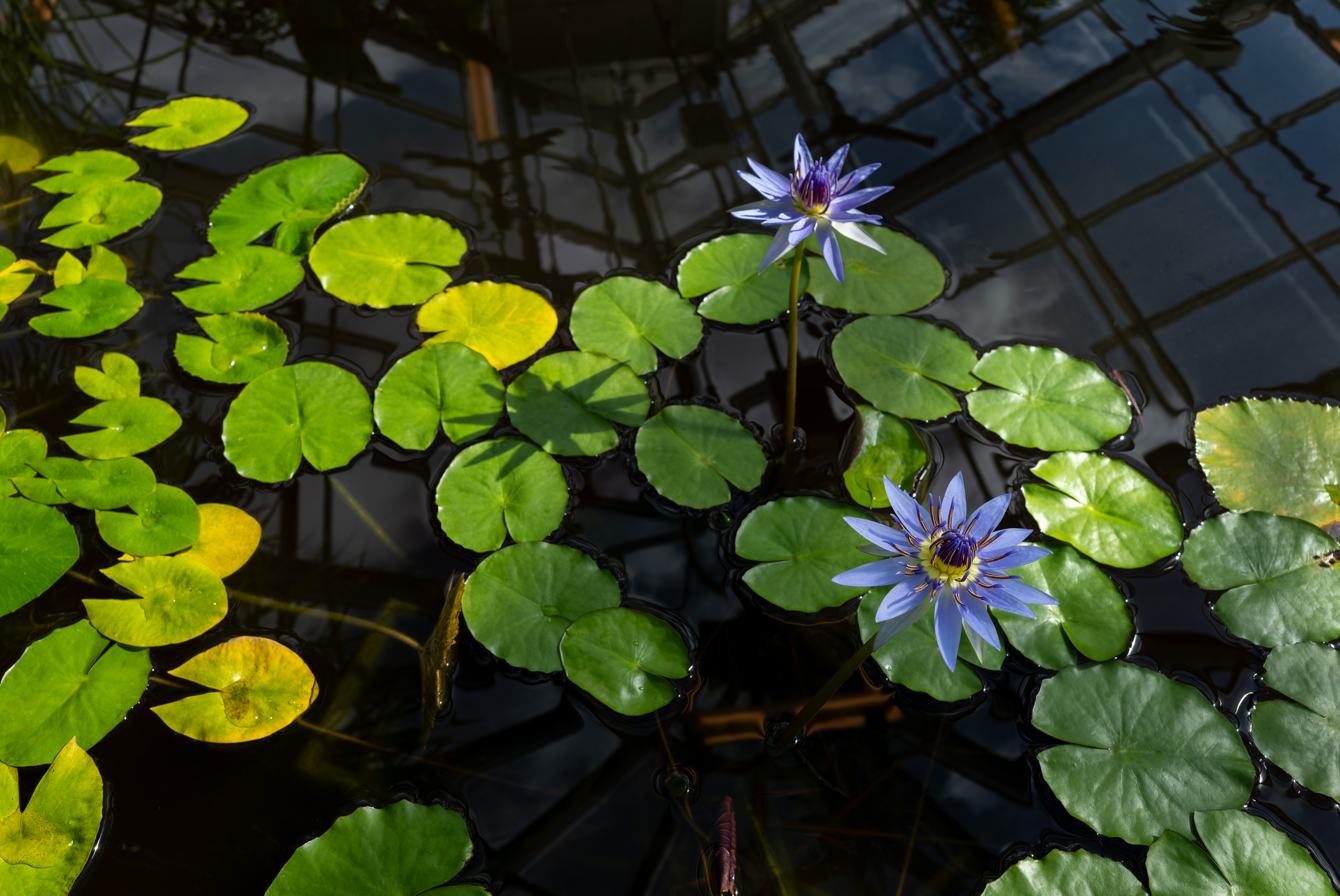
Nymphaea nouchali, Blue Lotuses

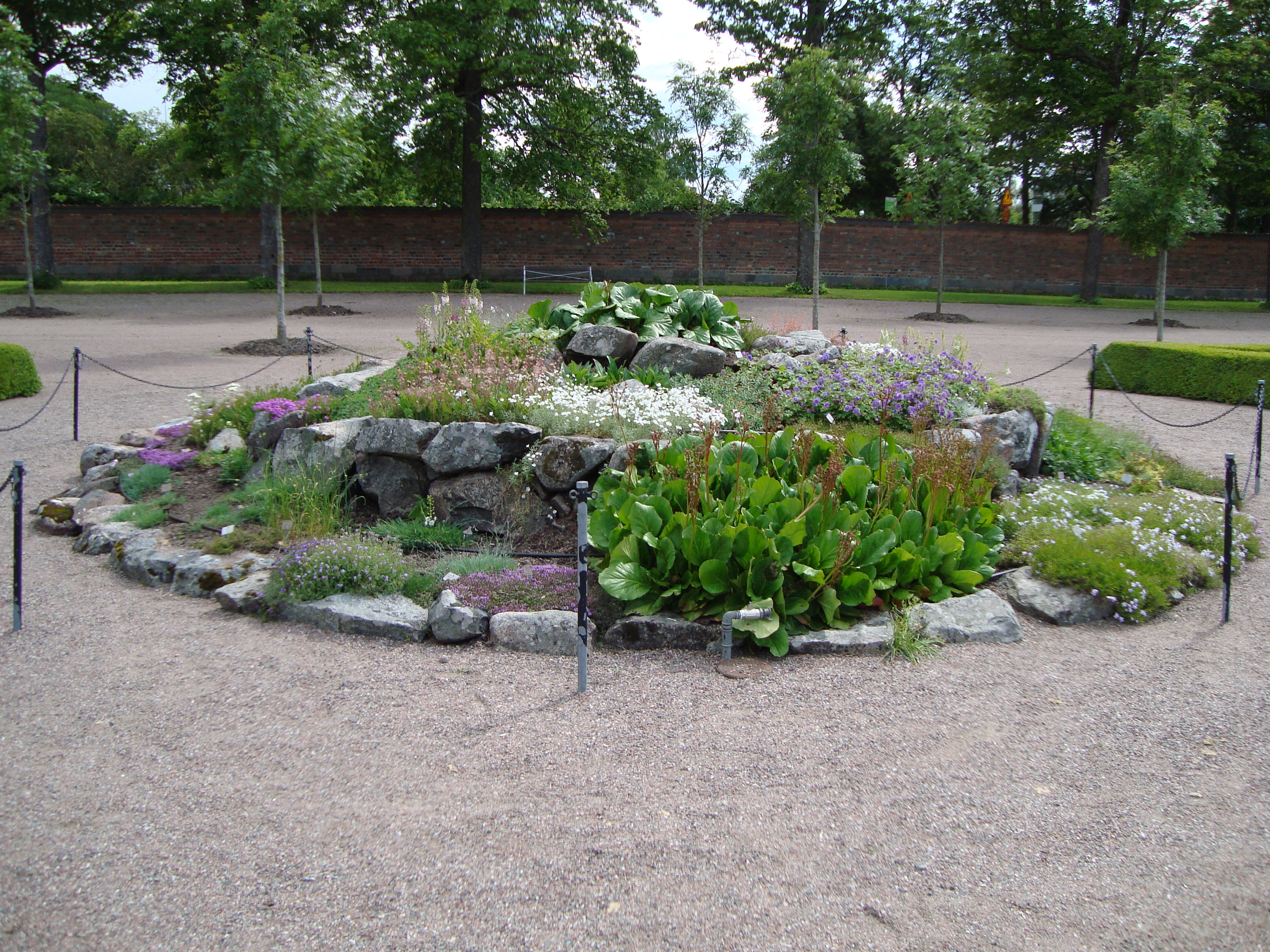
A flowerbed in the main section of the garden

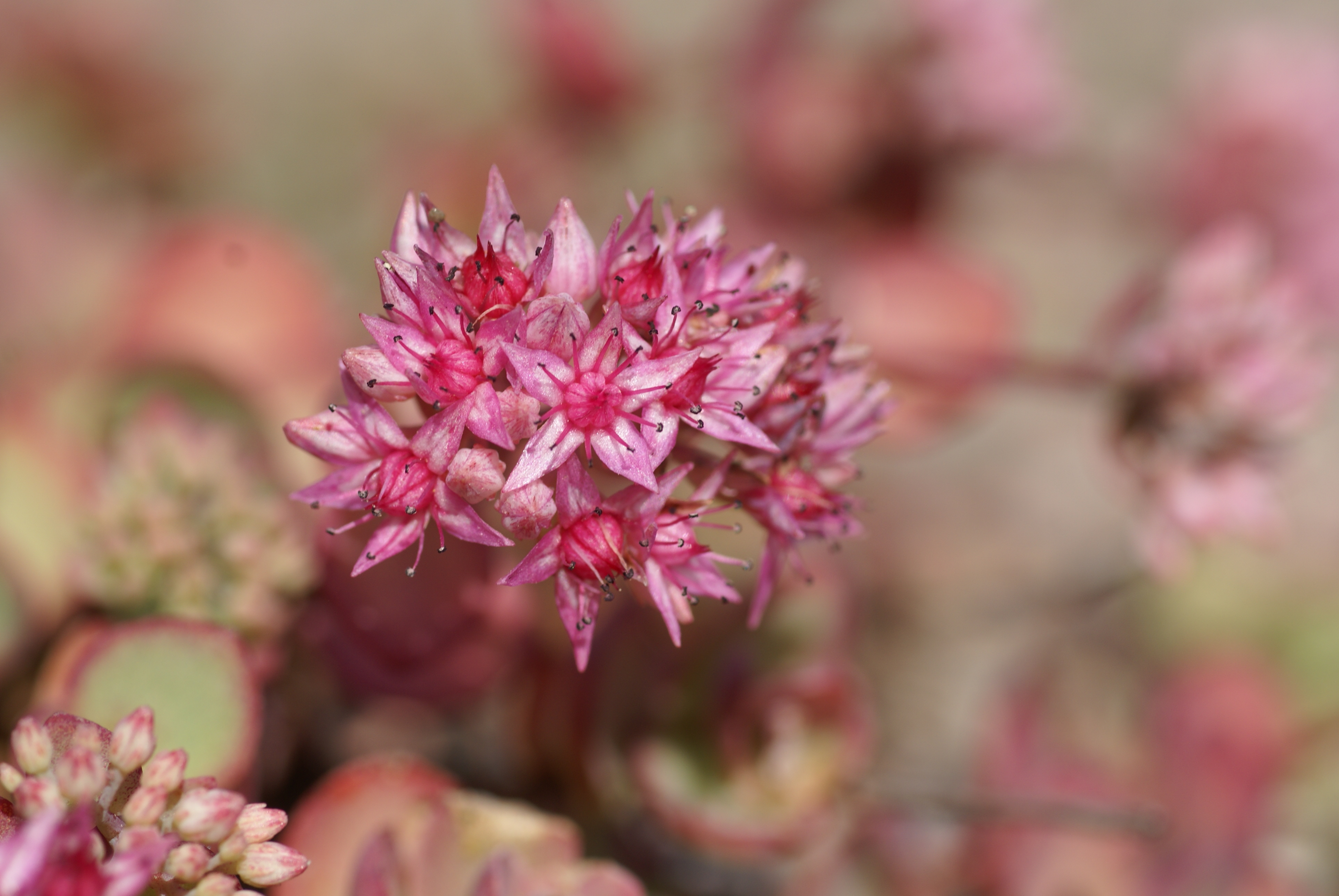
Hylotelephium ewersii, native to the high mountains of Asia

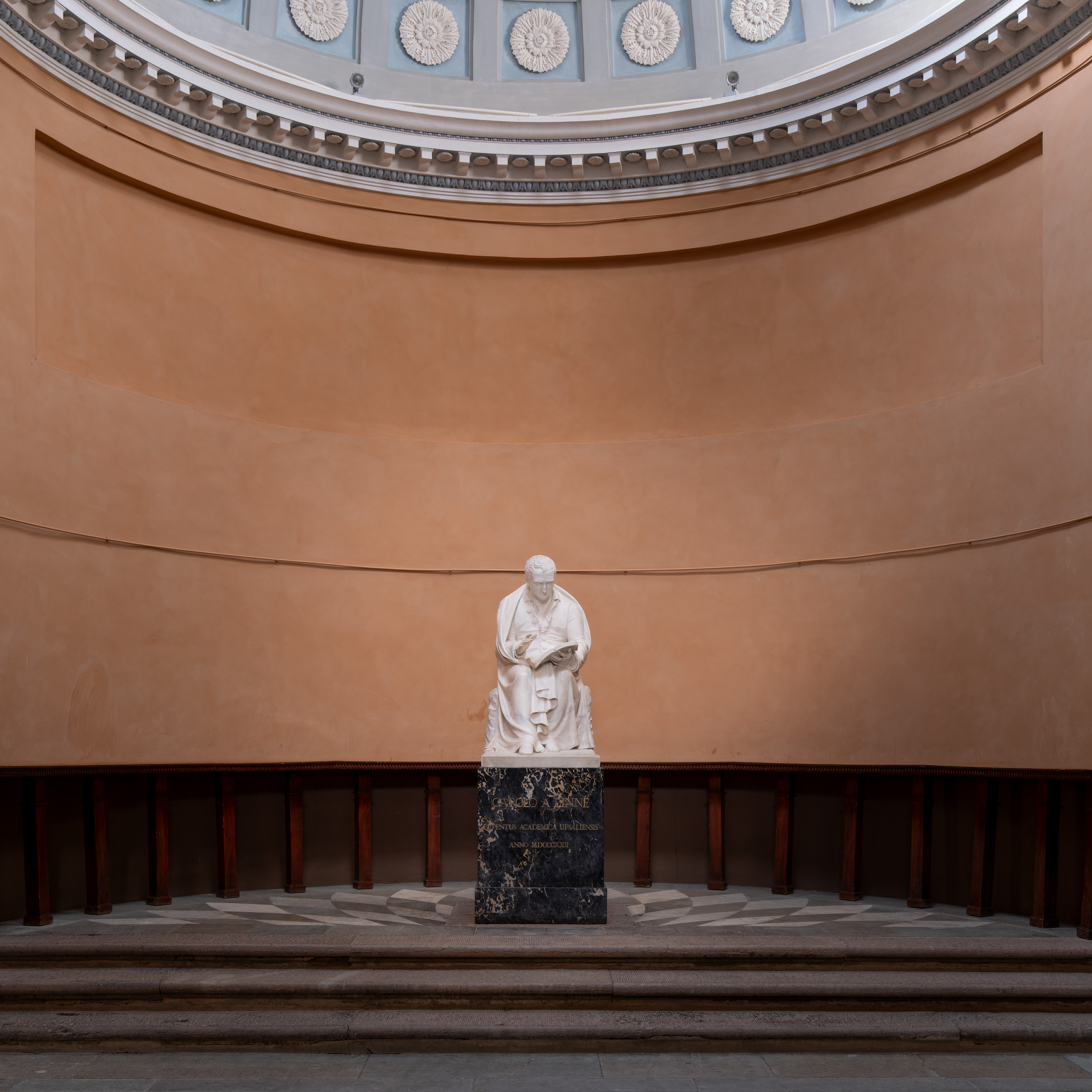
Statue of Carl Linnaeus in the Linneanum
