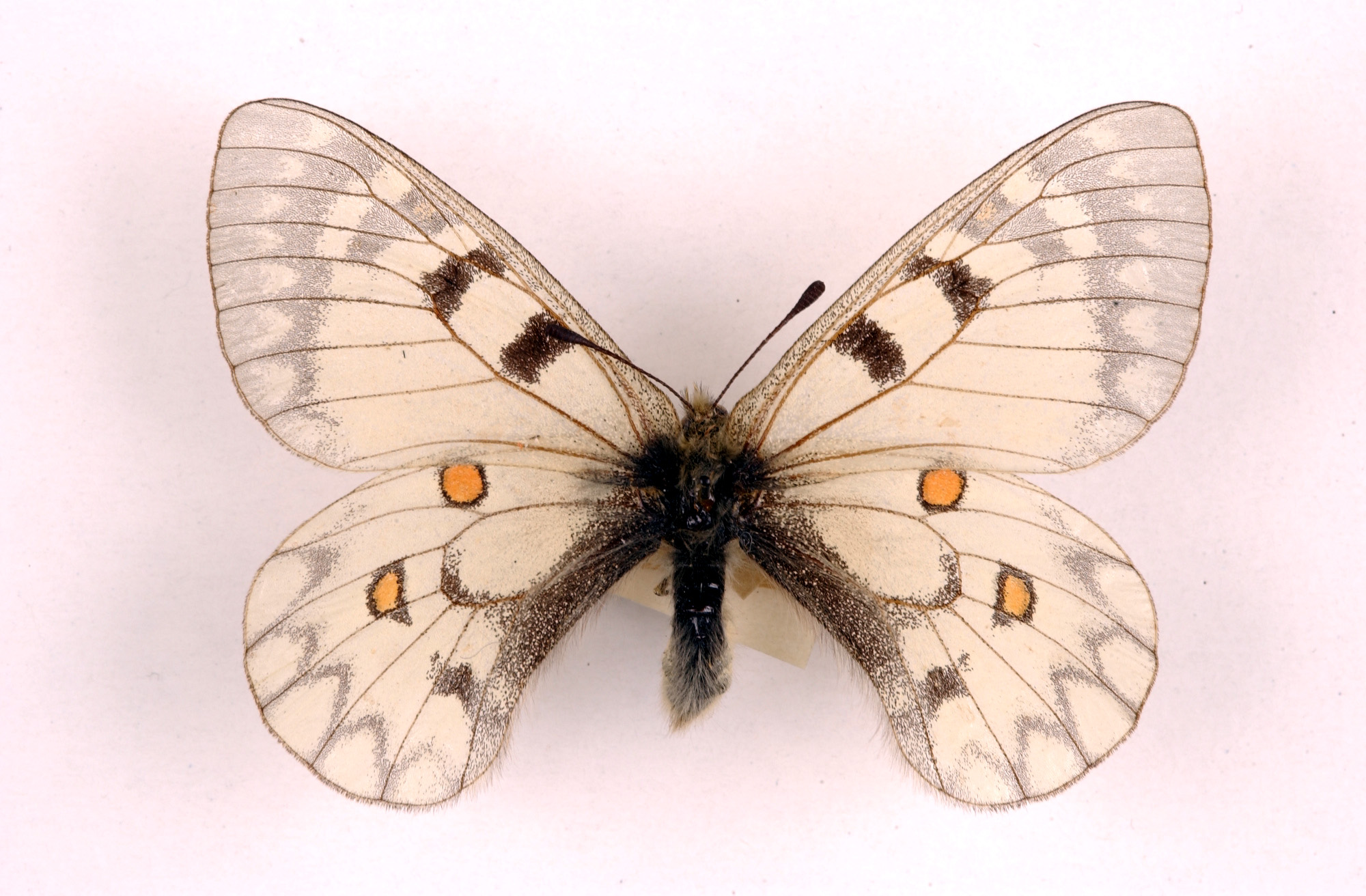
- Parnassius ariadne forma primopicta

Scientific classification
- Kingdom: Animalia
- Phylum: Arthropoda
- Clade: Pancrustacea
- Class: Insecta
- Order: Lepidoptera
- Family: Papilionidae
- Genus: Parnassius
- Species: P. ariadne

Binomial name
- Parnassius ariadne Lederer, 1853

= Parnassius ariadne =

Species of butterfly

Parnassius ariadne is a high altitude butterfly which is found in Central Asia (Altaï entering Russia, China, la Mongolia and Kazakhstan). It is a member of the snow Apollo genus (Parnassius) of the swallowtail family (Papilionidae).

== Identification ==
Note: The wing pattern in Parnassius species is inconsistent and the very many subspecies and forms make identification problematic and uncertain. Structural characters derived from the genitalia, wing venation, sphragis and foretibial epiphysis are more, but not entirely reliable. The description given here is a guide only. For an identification key see Ackery P.R. (1975).

== Description ==
Wings white. Cell-spots of forewing elongate-rotundate, deep black; beyond the cell an abbreviated curved macular band and near the vitreous distal edge a similar, but nearly complete and more strongly marked band. Hindwing with two distinct red or yellow ocelli, and two anal spots, bearing sometimes red pupils; abdominal margin black grey. Female more strongly marked than male, the middle band of forewing prolonged. This band sometimes marked as strongly as, or more strongly than, the submarginal band, the hindwing bearing near the edge a distinct band of arcs or halfmoons, which appear sometimes also in the male this form being described as dentata. Underside without red basal spots. Pouch of female whitish, strongly elongate, similar to that of P. mnemosyne. Antenna black. Altai, Saissan. Often confounded with the American Parnassius clodius or forms of the same; however, these are not difficult to recognize by the pattern being somewhat similar to that of P. eversmanni and P. felderi.

== Range ==
Altai (nominate subspecies) The type locality is "...sudwestlichen Vorbergen des Altai an kahlten felsigen Stellen" [Bukhtarma River sources, Altai]. Subspecies clarius sensu Bryk and Eisner, 1932 are found in the Saur and the Tarbagatai

== Biology ==
Adults fly on open flowery slopes in the forest zone up to 1,800-2,000 m in the Altai. In Saur and Tarbagatai, the insect is also found at lower altitudes (down to 300 m), preferring stony slopes and canyons. The flight period is May to July. The host plant of the larva is Corydalis (C. nobilis and some others). The insects hibernate in the egg stage or newly hatched larvae.
