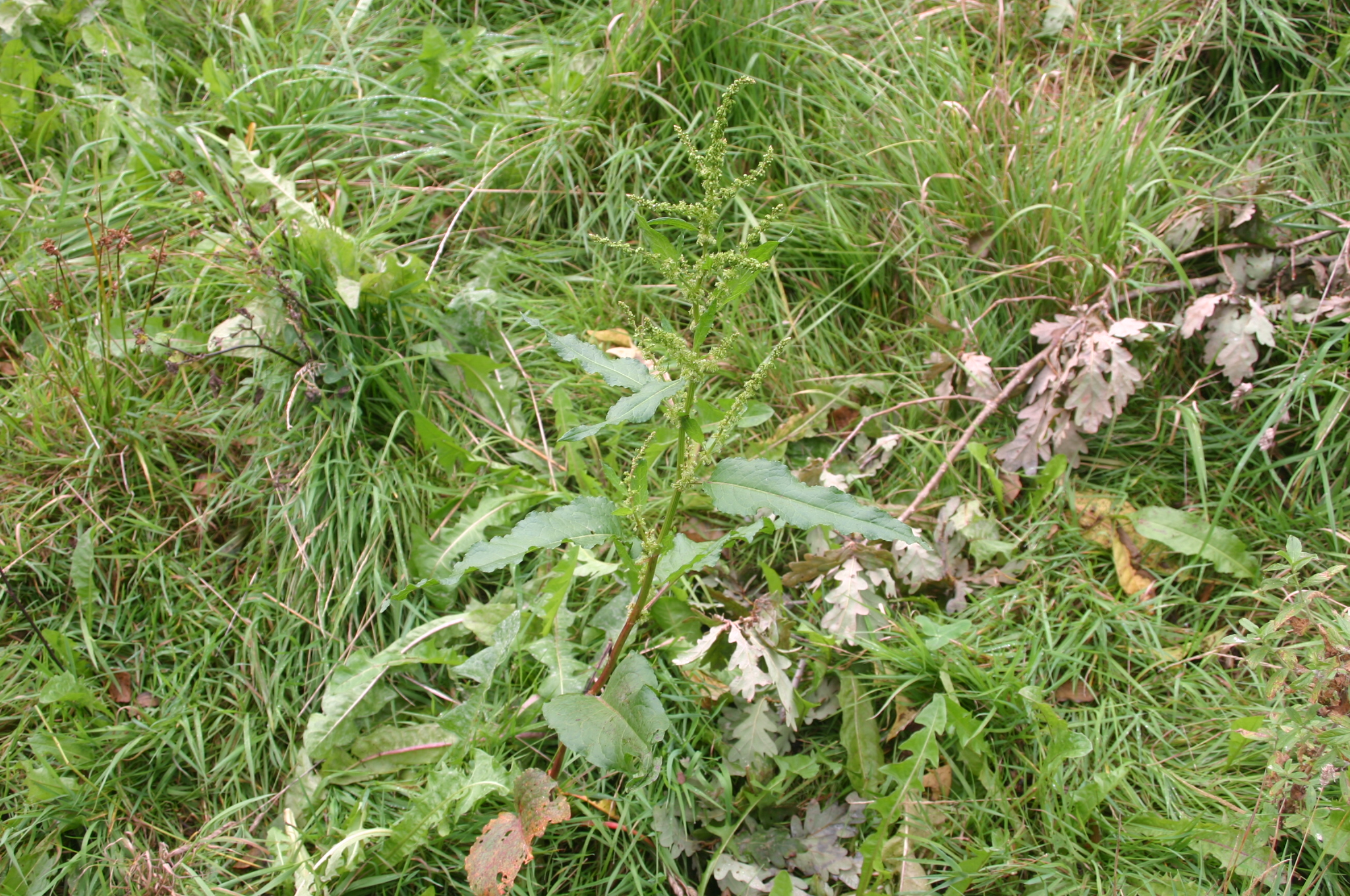

Scientific classification
- Kingdom: Plantae
- Clade: Tracheophytes
- Clade: Angiosperms
- Clade: Eudicots
- Order: Caryophyllales
- Family: Polygonaceae
- Genus: Rumex
- Species: R. longifolius

Binomial name
- Rumex longifolius DC.

= Rumex longifolius =

Dooryard dock

Species of flowering plant

Rumex longifolius, commonly known as the dooryard dock or northern dock, is a perennial species of plant in the genus Rumex.

A variety has been described:

- Rumex longifolius var. nanus

== Description ==
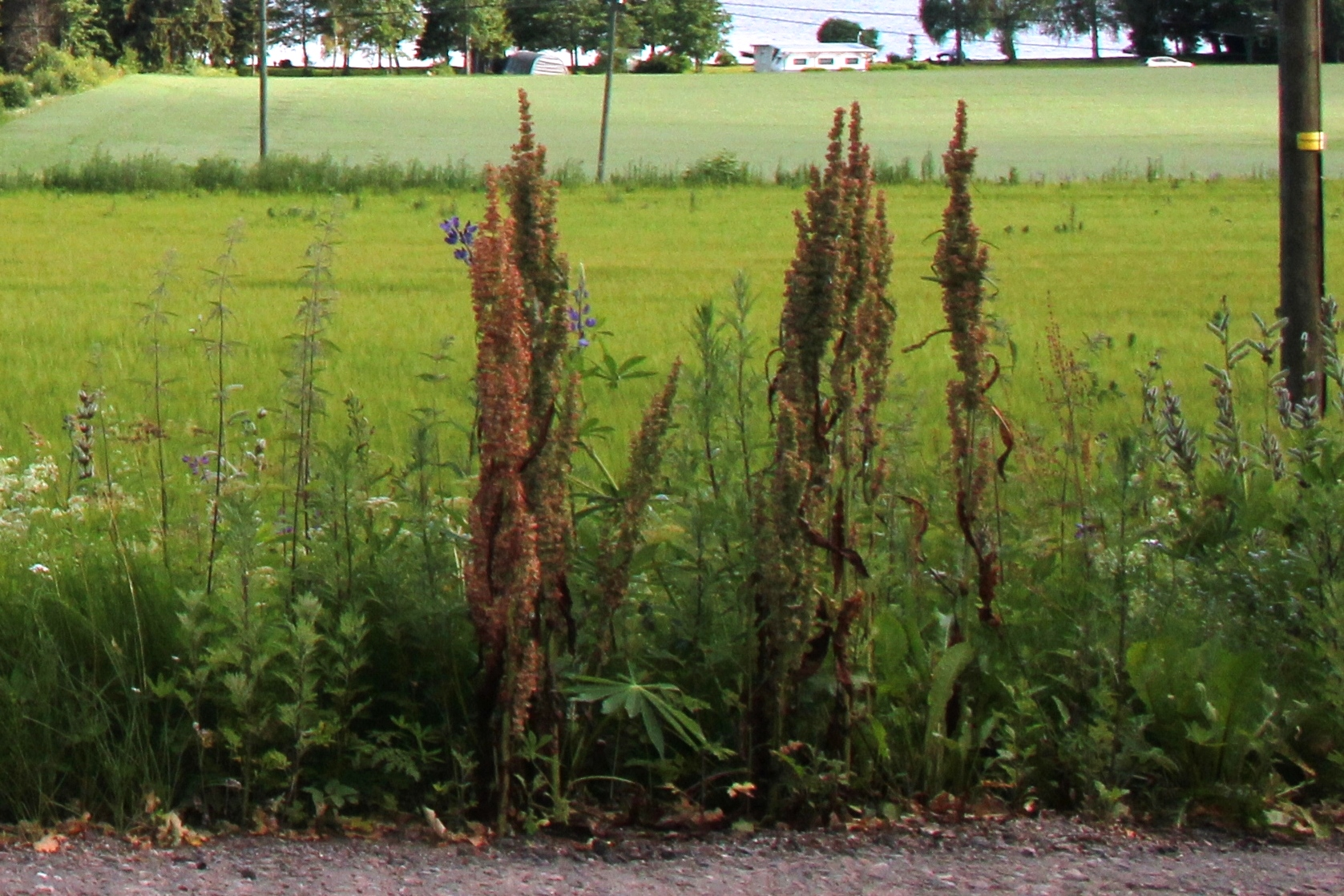
Rumex longifolius.

Rumex longifolius is a perennial plant that grows to a height of 60 to 120 cm (24 to 47 in). It has large, broad leaves, the edges of which are crinkled and undulating. The upper surface of the leaves is hairless and the under surface hairy beside the veins. The stems are erect, tough, and unbranched until just below the inflorescence. The junctions of the stems are covered by two fused stipules which form an ochrea, a thin, paper-like sheath - a characteristic of the family Polygonaceae, and fringed above in this species. The stem leaves are alternate and are narrowly ovate–lanceolate and have a rounded or tapered base. The leaf stalks are approximately the same length as the leaf blade. The inflorescence consists of large clusters of racemes which contain small greenish flowers that are bisexual. The perianth-segments are in two whorls of three. Segments in the outer whorl are small and spreading while the inner whorl forms the fruit valves, which are rounded or kidney-shaped and have either entire edges or crinkly ones. Each flower has six stamens, a pistil consisting of three fused carpels and three styles. The fruit is a glossy brown nut with a triangular cross section. This plant blooms from July to September.

== Distribution and habitat ==
Rumex longifolius is native to Europe, including Britain, from Scandinavia southwards and eastwards to the Pyrenees, the Caucasus, Western and Central Asia. It chiefly grows in open areas such as on roadsides, in arable fields and in damp grassy places.
