= Linnaean Garden =

Botanical garden in Sweden

Coordinates: 59°51′44″N 17°38′2″E

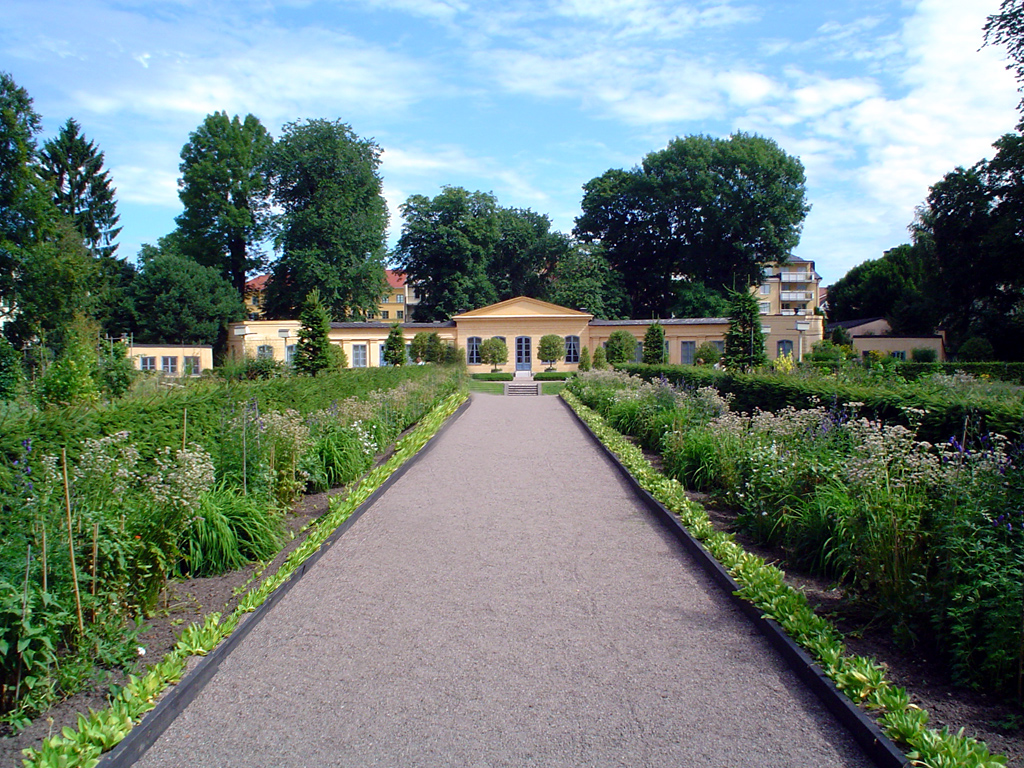
Linnaean Garden view to the orangery

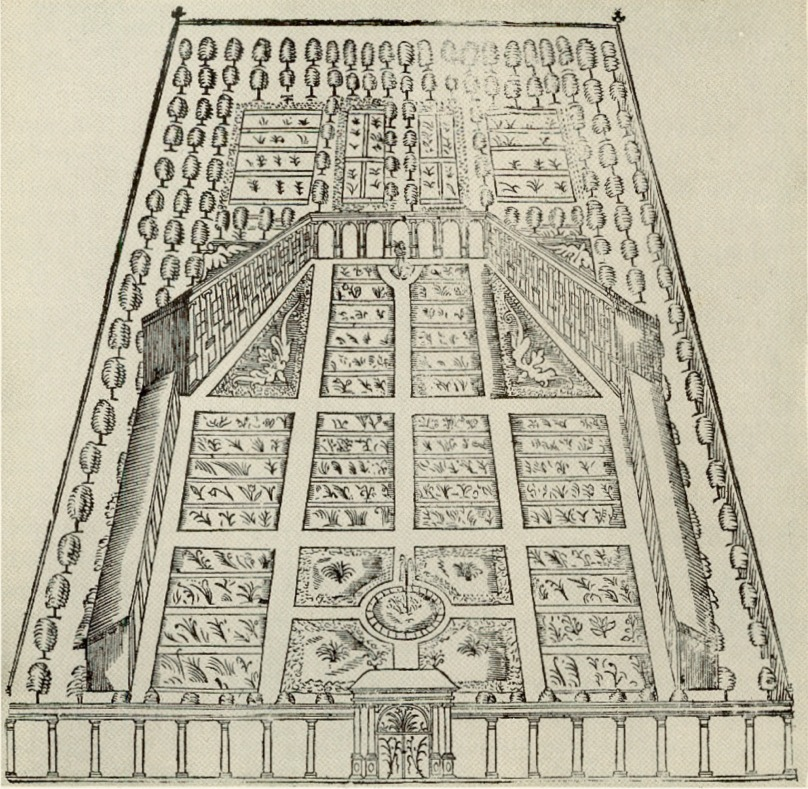
Rudbeck's own design for the botanical garden (1675)

The Linnaean Garden or Linnaeus Garden (Swedish: Linnéträdgården) is the oldest of the botanical gardens belonging to Uppsala University, Sweden, and nowadays one of two satellite gardens of the larger University of Uppsala Botanic Garden, the other being the Linnaeus family's former summer home Linnaeus's Hammarby. The garden has been restored and is kept as an 18th-century botanical garden, according to the specifications of Carl Linnaeus, who started studying at Uppsala University in 1730 where he later became professor of botany and principal and is known for formalising the modern system of naming organisms, creating the modern binomial nomenclature, and who owned the garden from 1741 and had it rearranged according to his own ideas, documented in his work Hortus Upsaliensis (1748).

The garden was originally planned and planted by Olaus Rudbeck, professor of medicine, in 1655, and had about 1,800 different species in late 17th century, but was damaged in the 1702 Uppsala city fire. In 1693, Rudbeck also built the house adjacent to the garden, nowadays known as the Linnaeus Museum (Linnémuséet), which was residence of Linnaeus from 1743, and from his death in 1778 to 1934 residence of employees at Uppsala University, the last of whom was musician Hugo Alfvén. Since 1937, the house has been a museum of Linnaeus personal and professional life, with furniture, household items and textiles belonging to the Linnaeus family exhibited together with Linnaeus personal medicinal cabinet, insect cabinet and herbarium.

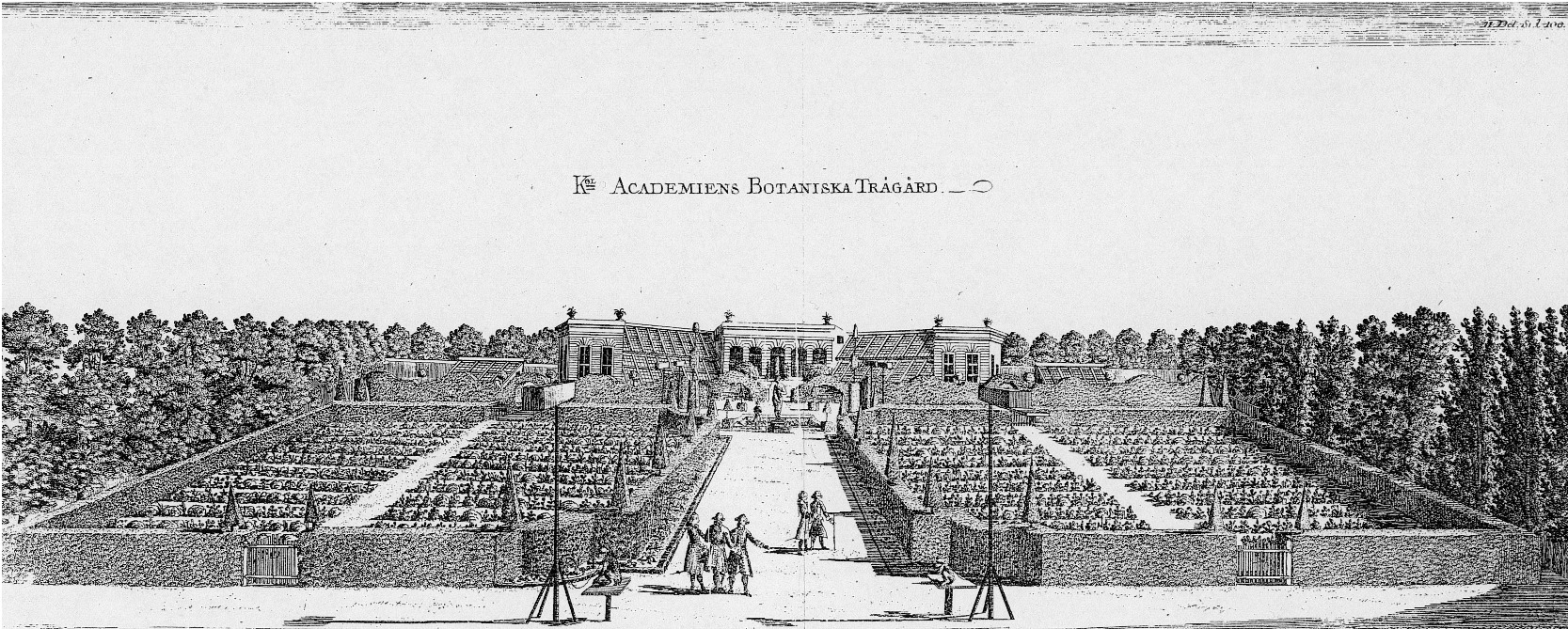
Engraving from 1770 of the garden of Linnaeus

After the gardens of Uppsala Castle had been donated to the university by King Gustav III to serve as a new botanical garden, the old one was left to decay. It was bought by the Swedish Linnaean Society in 1917 and restored according to the detailed description in the Hortus Upsaliensis. The garden was later taken over by the university, while the Linnaeus Museum is still run by the Society.

== Gallery ==
Photos of the Linnean Museum

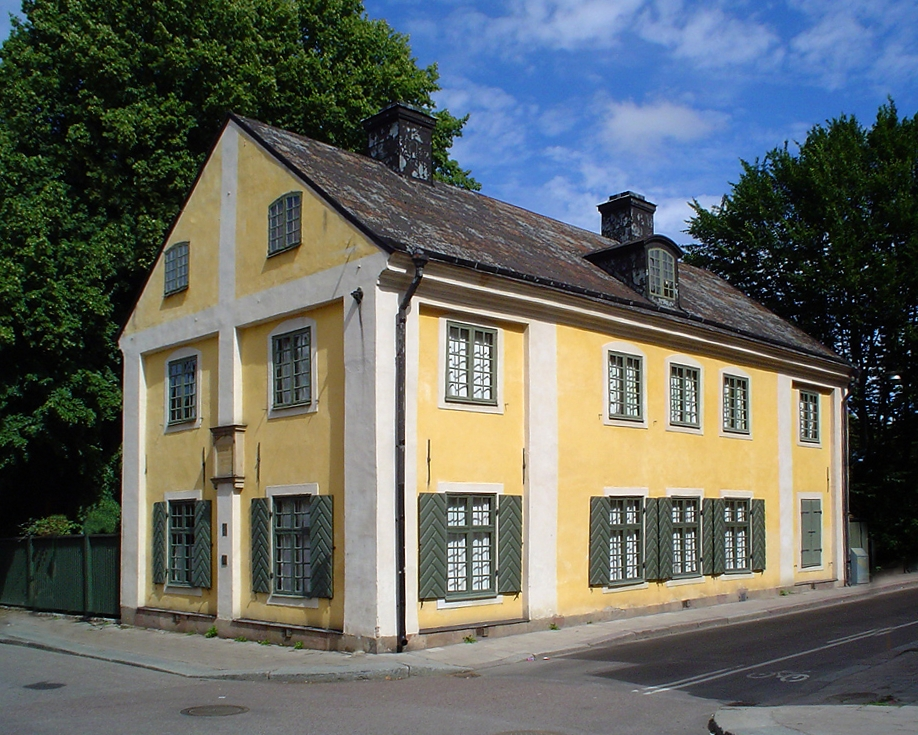
Residence of Carl Linnaeus 1743–1778

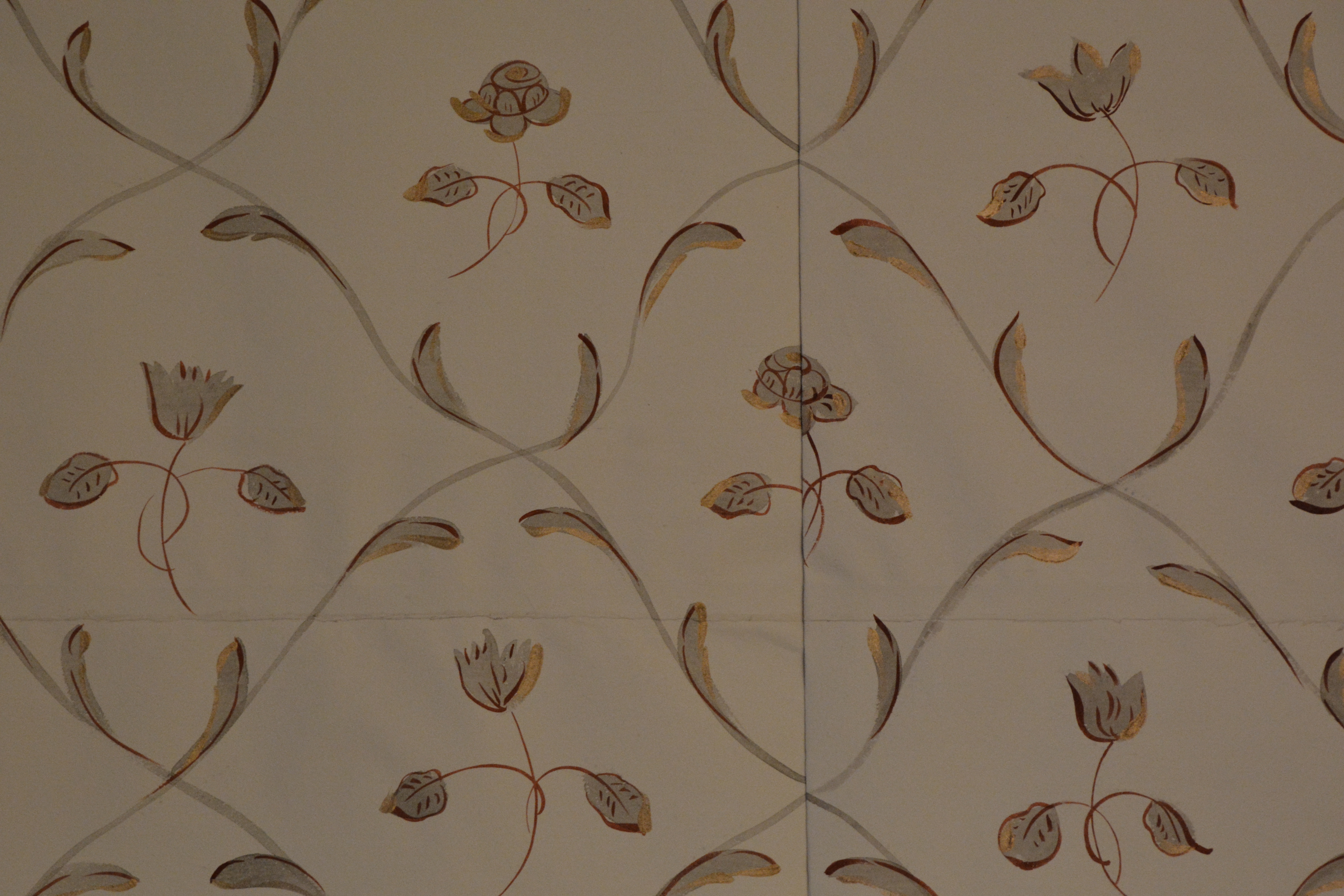
Wallpaper of the large room at the bottom floor

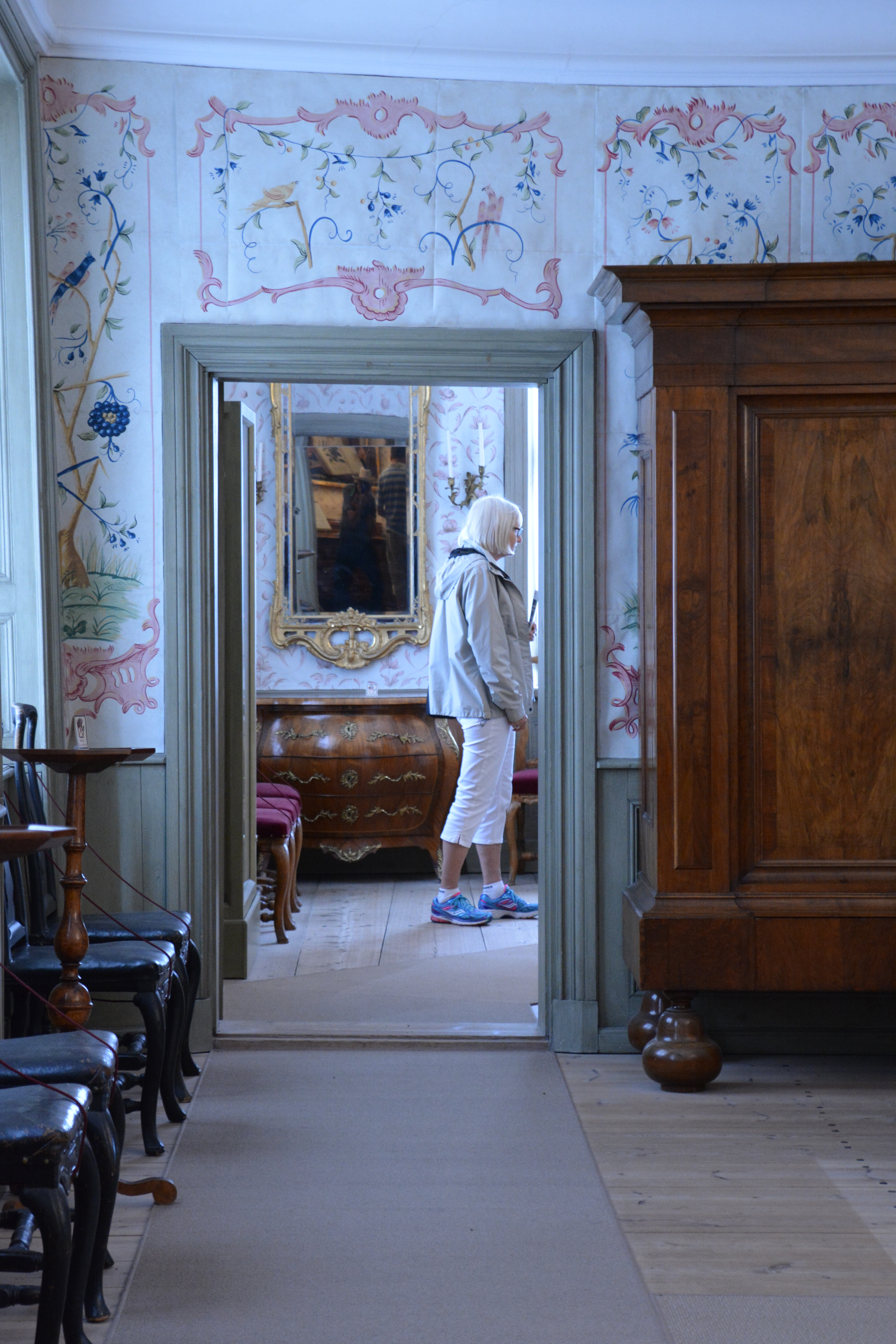
Large room at the bottom floor

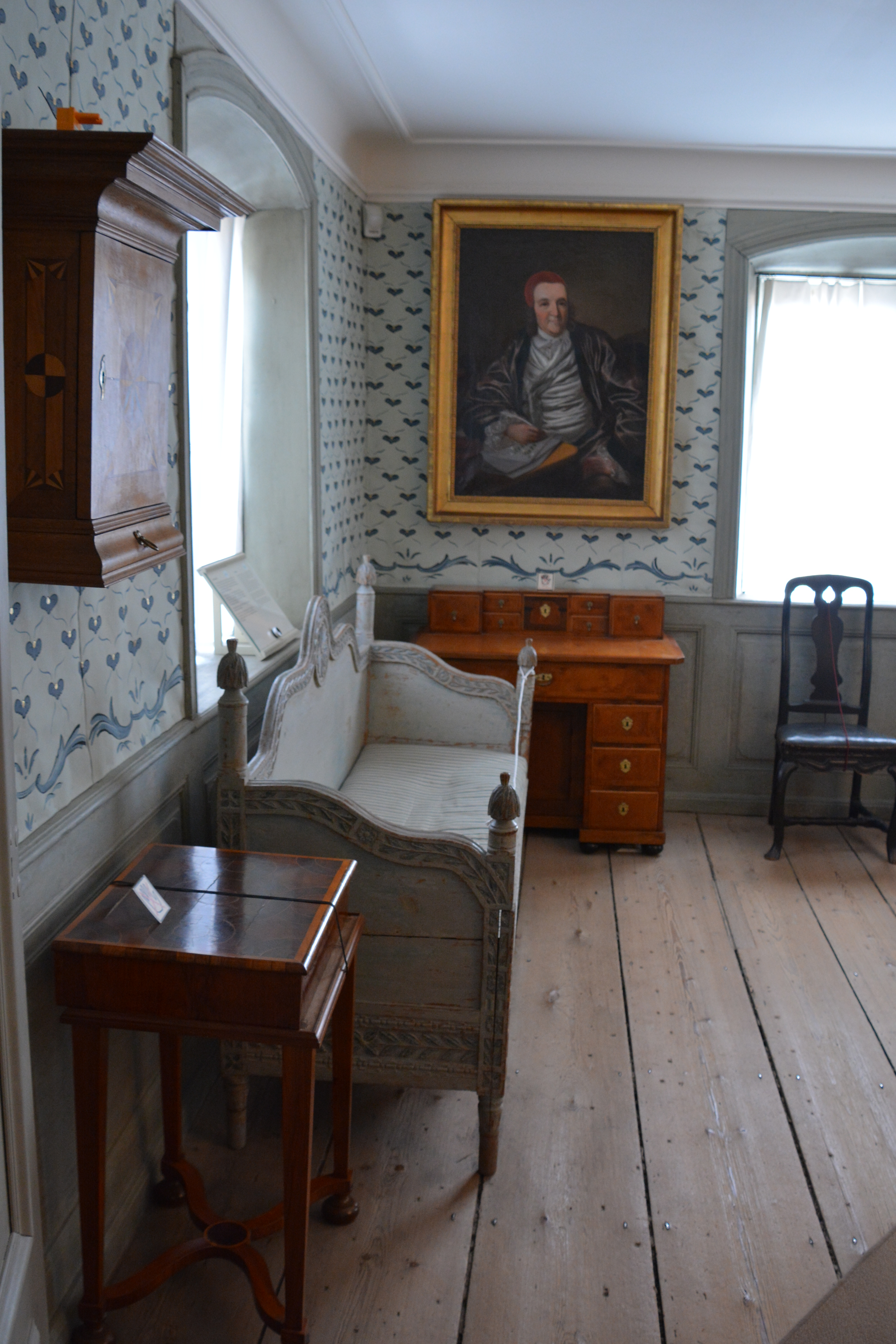
Bottom floor

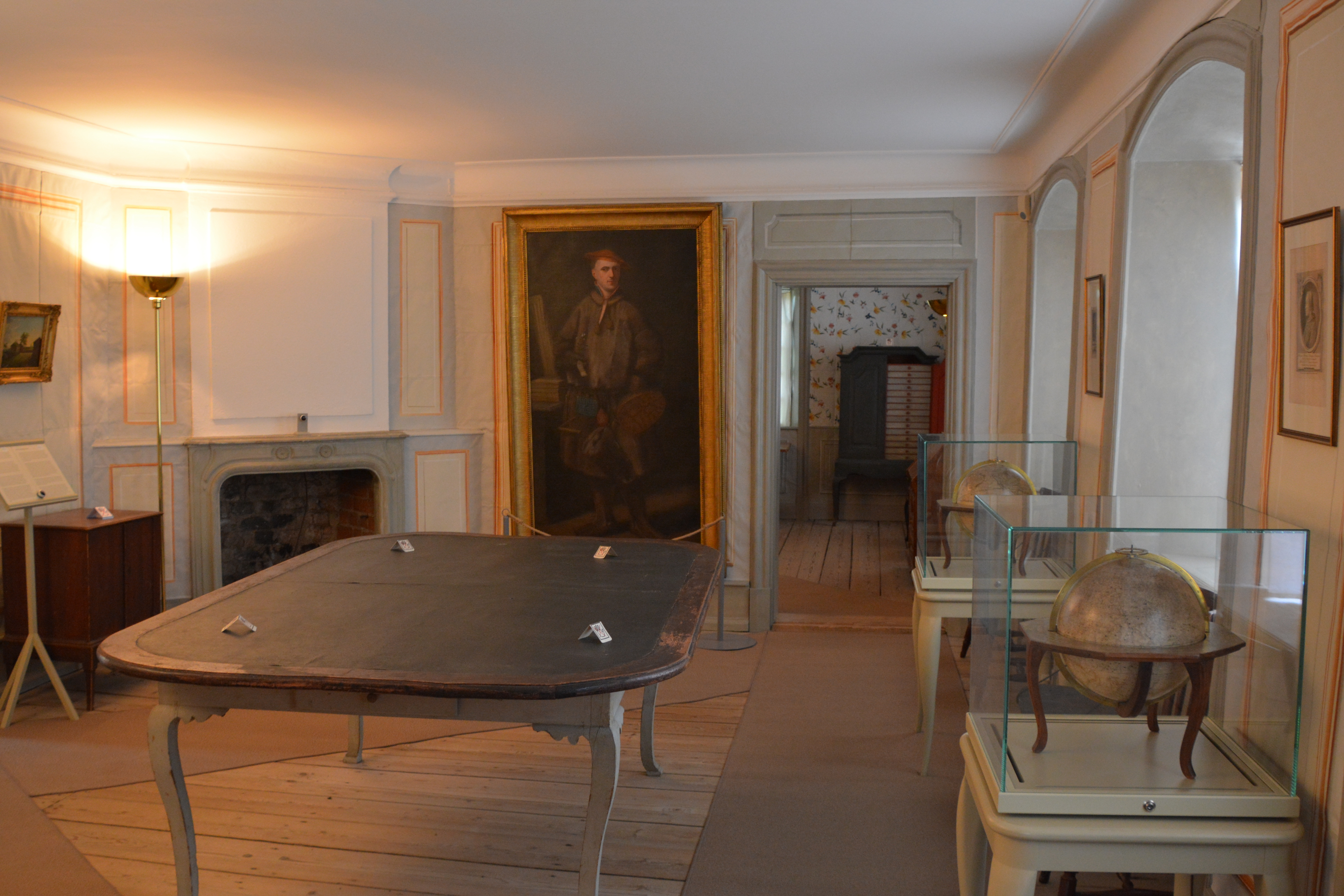
Hall, upstairs

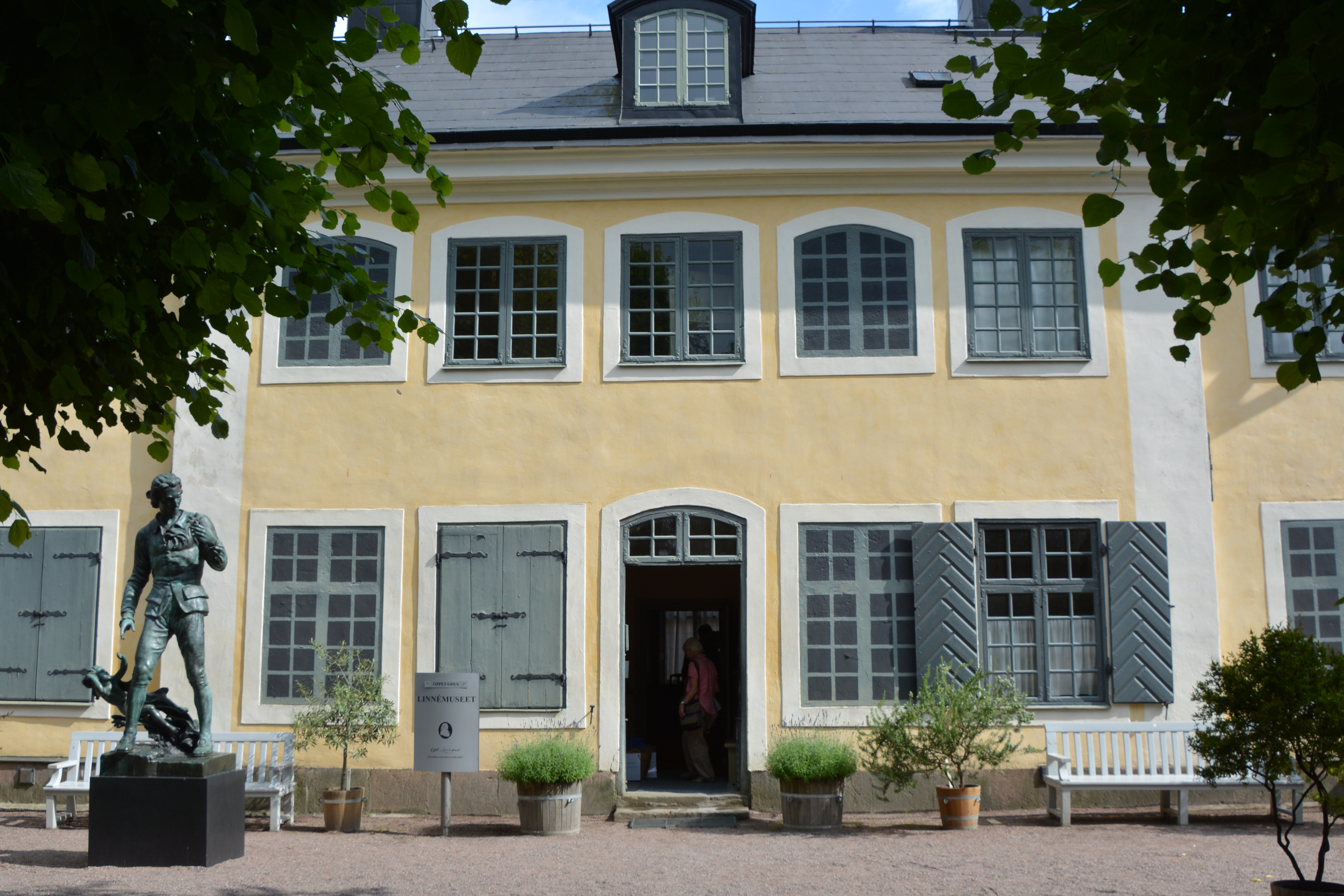
Entrance from the Linnaean Garden
