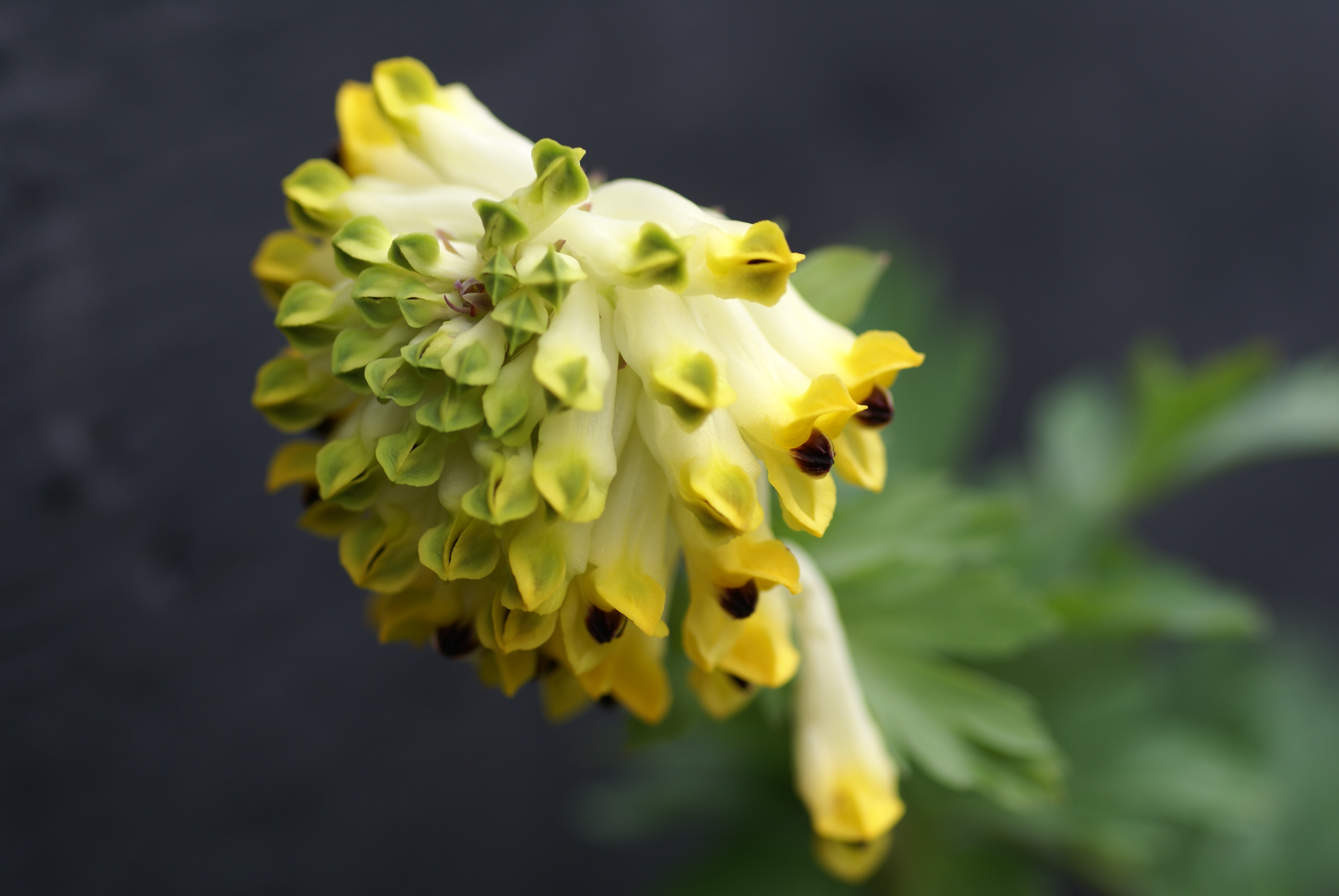

Scientific classification
- Kingdom: Plantae
- Clade: Tracheophytes
- Clade: Angiosperms
- Clade: Eudicots
- Order: Ranunculales
- Family: Papaveraceae
- Genus: Corydalis
- Species: C. nobilis

Binomial name
- Corydalis nobilis (L.) Pers.

Synonyms
- Fumaria nobilis L.; Calocapnos nobilis (L.) Spach; Capnogonium nobile (L.) Bernh. ex Endl.; Capnogorium nobilis (L.) Bernh.; Capnoides nobilis (L.) Moench

= Corydalis nobilis =

Species of flowering plant

Corydalis nobilis, the Siberian corydalis, is a perennial plant native to Siberia, Xinjiang and Kazakhstan. It was introduced to Europe by Linnaeus, who had asked his friend Erich Laxmann for seeds of Lamprocapnos spectabilis (old-fashioned bleeding heart), but was sent seeds of C. nobilis instead. Both Lamprocampnos and Corydalis are members of the family Papaveraceae, with seeds having an attached elaiosome that makes them attractive to ants, which disperse the seeds.

== Description ==
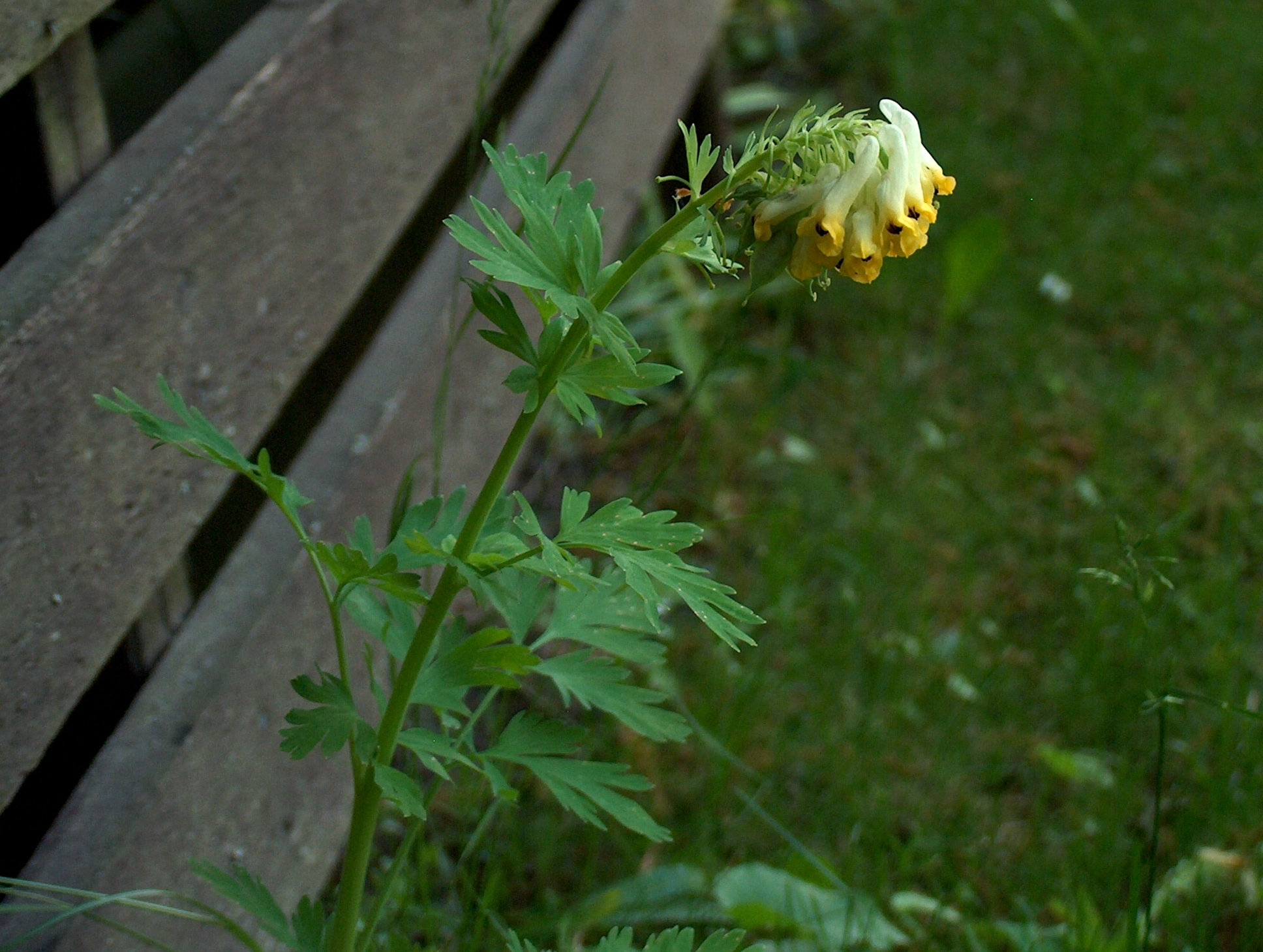
C. nobilis growing in Finland

C. nobilis bears its compact cymose inflorescence on a stem that can be as tall as 50 cm. The stem is upright. Leaves are pinnate.

Its flowers are yellow or orange; inner petals have dark violet at the top. The individual flowers resemble small snapdragons.

The seeds of C. nobilis typically have elaiosomes (a fatty body attached to the seed but not part of it, which can be eaten by ants without harming the seed within.) Seeds of C. nobilis are dispersed by ants, who carry seeds away to feed on the elaiosomes. Myrmecochory (seed dispersal by ants) is also observed in other Fumariaceae and has evolved independently in many other plant genera as well.

== Distribution ==
Corydalis nobilis, first described based on seeds sent to Linnaeus from Siberia, is now dispersed as an ornamental plant. It prefers moist soil in spring, drier in summer, and does well in full sun or partial shade. It is very hardy.

== Association with Linnaeus ==
Linnaeus had seen a drawing of Lamprocapnos spectabilis (old-fashioned bleeding heart) in the thesis of a Russian student who was describing many Siberian plants. He longed to see a living specimen of this flower for himself. In 1765, he was delighted to receive seeds from Siberia that he thought would grow into bleeding heart plants, but the seeds were instead for a different member of the family Fumariaceae, C. nobilis. The seeds were sent to Linnaeus by his friend Erich Laxmann; they originated from a Siberian mountaintop in the northwestern Altai Range. They had not previously been known in Europe.

Seeds of C. nobilis spread throughout Europe from Linnaeus's garden in Hammarby, reaching England's Kew Gardens in 1783. After the death of Linnaeus, C. nobilis self-seeded throughout his garden, becoming a weed.
