= Linnaeus's Hammarby =

Museum in Sweden

Coordinates: 59°49′3″N 17°46′35″E

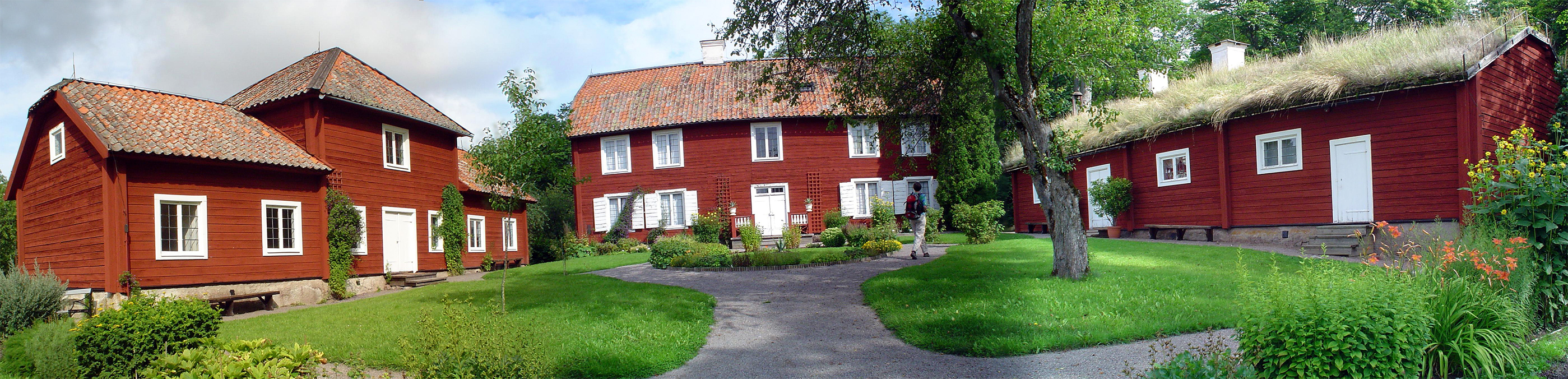
Linnaeus's Hammarby

Linnaeus's Hammarby (Swedish: Linnés Hammarby) is a historic house museum and mansion, and one of three botanical gardens belonging to Uppsala University, located in Sweden. It is situated about ten kilometres (6.2 mi) southeast of Uppsala.

== Carl Linnaeus ==
The manor house Hammarby was the former summer home of Carl Linnaeus and his family. Carl Linnaeus was a scientist and professor at Uppsala University. Linnaeus gradually turned the estate into his residence and private study, settling there permanently until his death.

== Buildings ==
The main house of Linnaeus has two floors, an attic and a cellar under part of the house. The house is constructed of horizontal logs.

Inside the house, the old wallpaper is distinguished, with flower design in dark red, gold and white. It was probably made c. 1880.

There are two other buildings in the compound. The east wing building housed the bakehouse and brewery. The west wing building probably housed the estate's staff and workers.

== Museum ==
The Linnaeus's Hammarby is a historic house and gardens museum. In 1935, the museum was declared a historical monument, and is administered by the National Property Board. The estate is currently run by Uppsala University.

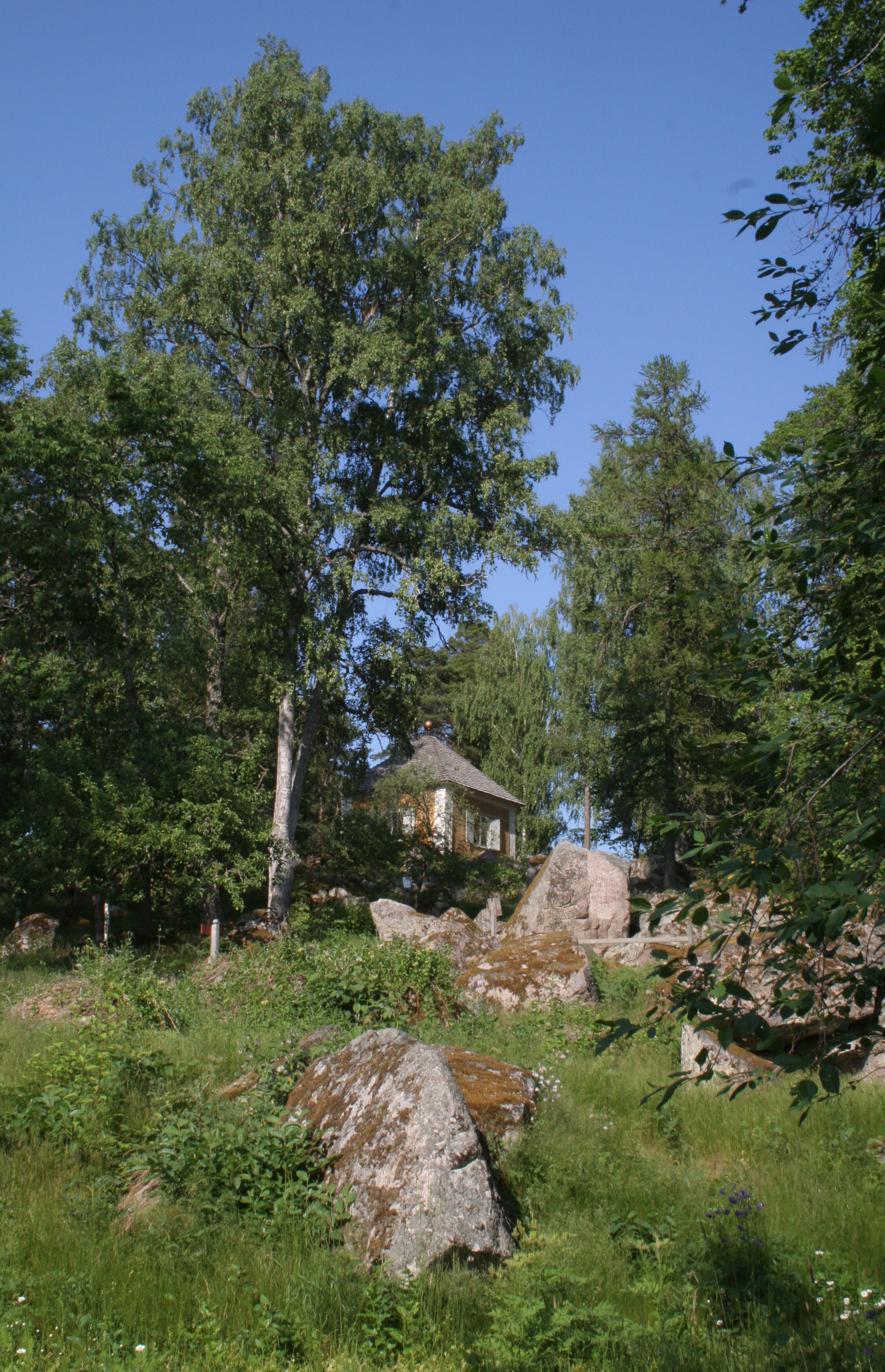
Garden

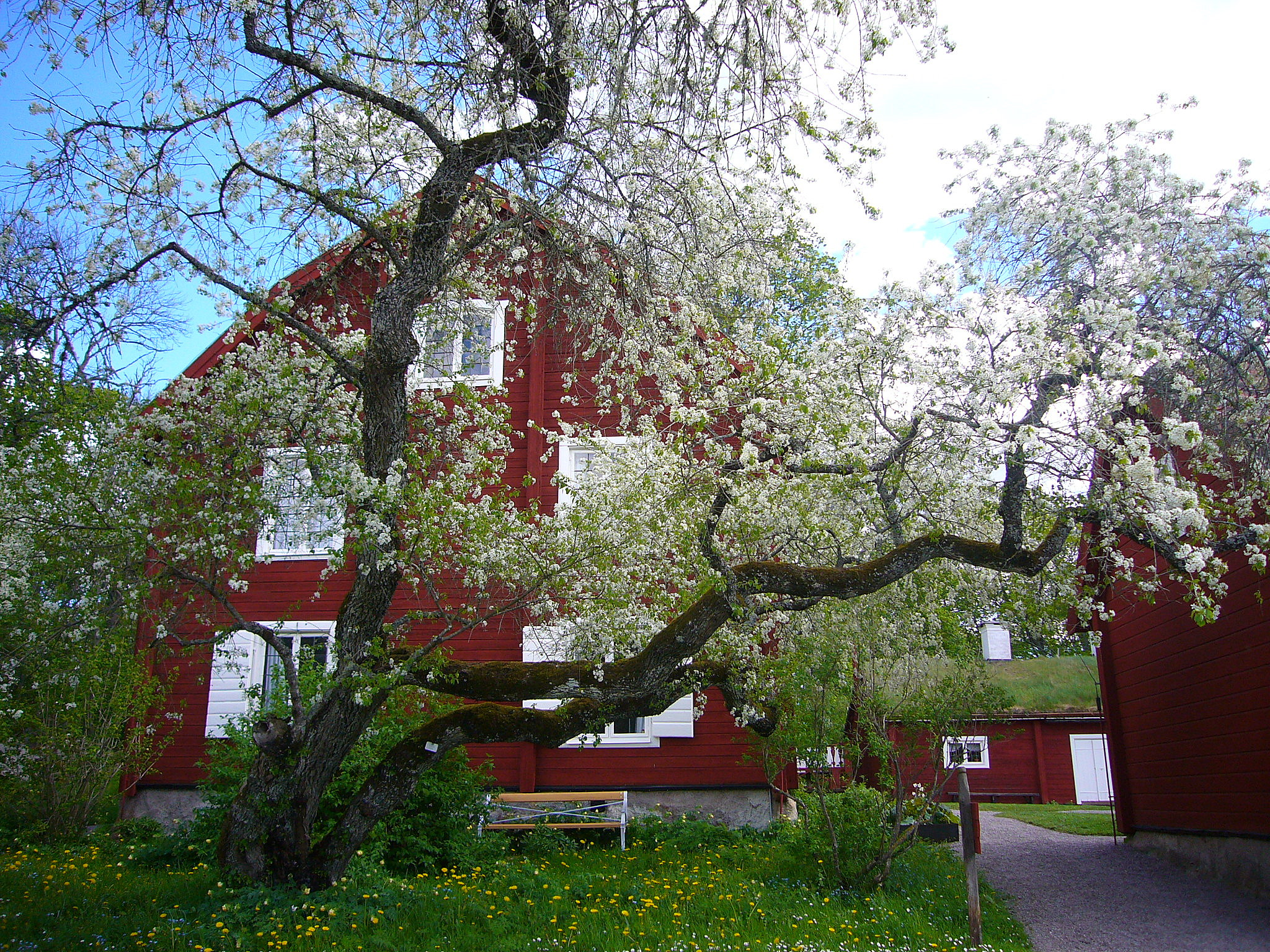
In the spring

== See also ==
- Linnaean Garden
- Corydalis nobilis
