= Frank Hannyngton =

Frank Hannyngton (25 October 1874 – 1 April 1919, in Bombay was a civil servant and amateur entomologist in India.

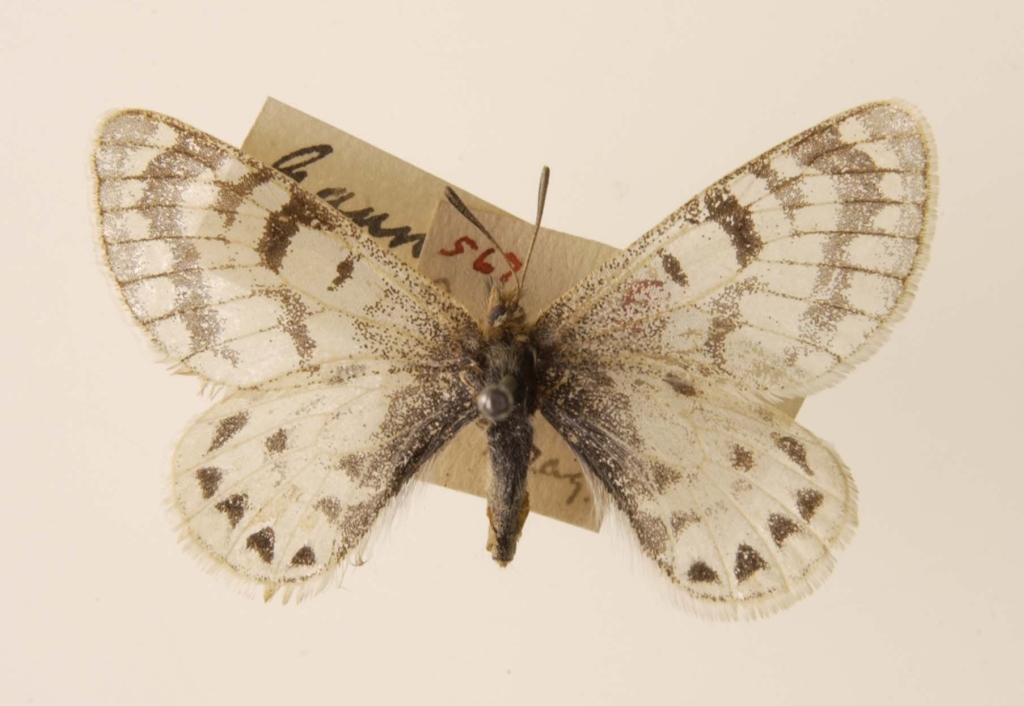
Parnassius hannyngtoni

Frank was the youngest son of John Child Hannyngton, a judge and a Resident at Madras and later Travancore and grandson of mathematician John Caulfield Hannyngton. His early education was at Trinity College, Dublin (where he was known as "Curly" and captain of the boats) and he then went to Wren's and passed the Indian Civil Service entrance in 1897. He began service in India on 30 January 1899 as an Assistant Collector and Magistrate in South Arcot (present day Tamil Nadu). His service locations included Tirunelveli, Malabar, Madras and Ooty. In 1912 he was appointed Commissioner of Coorg until 1918 when he moved to Bellary. During his time in Coorg he published a paper on the butterflies of Coorg in the Journal of the Bombay Natural History Society. He also collected the exuvia of a large dragonfly which was named after him as Heterogomphus hannyngtoni by F.C. Fraser in 1924. He also held the position of Postmaster General of Bengal during which time he sent collectors into the Chumbi Valley. Here he found a new Parnassius which Andrey Avinoff named after him as Parnassius hunnyngtoni. (Trans. Ento. Soc. 1915, p. 351) He also made collections of the butterflies of Kumaon.

He married Madeleine (Maisie), daughter of Colonel Willoughby Edward Gordon Forbes, in 1905. A member of the Bombay Natural History Society from 1908, he joined its executive committee in 1913. His father had a relationship with a Thiyya woman, and as a result his half-sister was the mother of notable Indian botanist Janaki Ammal.

== Publications ==
- Hannyngton, F. 1910 List of Butterflies from Kumaon. Excerpted in Peile, H.D. 1937, A Guide to Collecting Butterflies of India. Staples Press, London. Appendix C, pp. 234–238.
- Hannyngton, F M, 1915 Notes on Coorg butterflies with a detailed list of Hesperiidae. J. Bombay Nat. Hist. Soc 24:578-581
- Hannyngton, F., 1919 Life history notes on Coorg butterflies. J. Bombay Nat- Hist- Soc 26:371-872 scan
