= Hans P. Kraus =

Austrian-born book dealer (1907–1988)

- Born: October 12, 1907; Vienna, Austria
- Died: November 1, 1988 (aged 81); Ridgefield, Connecticut
- Occupation: Rare book dealer
- Known for: Success as a rare book dealer

Hans Peter Kraus (October 12, 1907 – November 1, 1988), also known as H. P. Kraus or HPK, was an Austrian-born American book dealer described as "without doubt the most successful and dominant rare book dealer in the world in the second half of the 20th century" and in a league with other rare book dealers such as Bernard Quaritch, Guillaume de Bure and A.S.W. Rosenbach. Kraus specialized in medieval illuminated manuscripts, incunables (books printed before 1501), and rare books of the 16th and 17th centuries, but would purchase and sell almost any book that came his way that was rare, valuable and important. He prided himself in being "the only bookseller in history...to have owned a Gutenberg Bible and the Psalters of 1457 and 1459 simultaneously," stressing that "'own' here is the correct word, as they were bought not for a client's account but for stock."

== Early life and career in Europe ==
Kraus was born on October 12, 1907, in Vienna, Austria. After working for R. Lechner in Vienna and Ernst Wasmuth in Berlin, he started his own rare book business in 1932, which prospered despite the Depression. In 1938, after the German annexation of Austria, Kraus was arrested for being Jewish and sent to the Dachau concentration camp. After several months, he was transferred to Buchenwald. After eight months in Buchenwald, he was released, returned to Vienna and ordered to leave Austria within two months.

Kraus abandoned his business and stock of 100,000 books, although he had previously shipped some books and valuables to Switzerland, and traveled to Stockholm, Sweden. He arranged to have his mother join him there; she arrived just two days before World War II began. In September he obtained a visa and sailed for New York City, arriving on October 12, 1939, where he arrived with the 1494 Vérard Columbus letter gaining him his first piece of publicity as a bookdealer in America: a newspaper column on the Columbus letter arriving on Columbus Day. Within two weeks of arrival, he met Hanni Zucker, also from Vienna, whom he subsequently married.

== Career in the United States ==
Kraus restarted his rare book business in New York, which soon began to prosper. His first important sale was to Lessing J. Rosenwald, a major book collector, who ultimately donated his collection of early printed books to the Library of Congress. Over the years, Kraus bought and sold major medieval illuminated manuscripts, incunables and assorted rare books and manuscripts. Among his most important sales were the Anhalt Gospels, the finely illuminated Hours of Catherine of Cleves now reunited with its other half at the Morgan Library, the Arthur Houghton copy of the Gutenberg Bible for $2.5 million, three copies of Caxton's first edition of the Canterbury Tales, and the original manuscript of the proclamation of the Louisiana Purchase, signed by Thomas Jefferson, He also purchased the enigmatic Voynich manuscript in 1961 for $24,500, and after seven years of unsuccessfully attempting to sell it for as much as $160,000 ultimately donated it to the Beinecke Library at Yale University. Kraus also sold the magnificent manuscript Giant Bible of Mainz to Lessing J. Rosenwald who donated it the Library of Congress. Shortly before World War II, Kraus became the leading dealer of books formerly owned by the Romanov family, when he purchased the collections of Russian book dealers Simeon J. Bolan and Israel Perlstein.

Early in his career, Kraus initiated a practice of buying up entire libraries or collections at a discounted price and then selling the items individually or in smaller groups, carefully researched and catalogued, for a great profit. He continued that practice after he moved to the United States, for example, buying in 1949 some 20,000 volumes of the Prince Liechtenstein library for a "rock bottom" price, the entire Frederick Adams collection of early communist, radical and anarchistic literature and ephemera, and in 1977 the remainder of the great manuscript collection of the 19th-century bibliomaniac Sir Thomas Phillipps, which after the better part of a century of auction sales, still consisted of 2,000 manuscript volumes and 130,000 manuscript letters and documents.

== Pre-dating the Gutenberg Bible? ==
In 1952, Kraus purchased a copy of an extremely rare incunabulum, the Constance Missal, then known in only two copies. Bearing no date, it was printed with type nearly identical to, but seemingly more primitive than, that used in the 1457 and 1459 Psalters, and some scholars believed that it might be the first printed book, pre-dating the Gutenberg Bible. Kraus sold it as a major bibliographical prize to the Morgan Library. Several years later, Allan Stevenson, by a brilliant and painstaking comparison of the different states of wear in the watermarks in the Constance Missal with those in dated books, conclusively established that it was printed in 1473, nearly 20 years after the Gutenberg Bible. Despite the definitive proof to the contrary, Kraus still professed that, "Speaking for myself, I believe that the Constance Missal is earlier than the Gutenberg Bible."

== Sale catalogs ==
Kraus regularly issued printed catalogs of books for sale, which contained extensive detailed descriptions of the books and manuscripts. Totaling at least 223, they are prized today as reference works. Some of the catalogs contained full color illustrations of bindings and illustrations, and a few were issued hardbound. Kraus had "the largest and most complete reference library of books on the subject of bibliography ever put together by a book dealer anywhere."

== Businessman and collector ==
Kraus quite understandably was very proud of his success as a businessman, amassing a fortune from the rare book and manuscript trade. He described his "philosophy of success in business" as: "Push on, hit hard, follow through." Besides being the only dealer to own, as inventory, the Gutenberg Bible and the 1457 and 1459 Psalters at the same time, he "owned most of the major incunabula," and "bought and sold more Caxtons than any other living bookseller." His autobiography is full of stories where he bought some rare manuscript or book at a low price and turned around and sold it for a much greater price. He also lamented a number of instances where he narrowly failed to secure some book or collection including some of the Dead Sea Scrolls, or where he sold a very rare item too cheaply.

Kraus acknowledged that his autobiography might leave the reader with "the impression that [he was] interested only in making money." However, he had a deep love of books and was himself a serious collector. One area of particular interest for Kraus was books relating to Sir Francis Drake. He eventually wrote a biography of Drake, based on materials in his collection, a collection that he later donated to the Library of Congress. Kraus also put together a collection of important manuscripts concerning colonial Spanish America, particularly Mexico, including a letter from Amerigo Vespucci. Kraus donated that collection to the Library of Congress in 1969.

In 1978 Kraus published his autobiography A Rare Book Saga.

== Journals and reprints ==
Over the years, Kraus purchased large collections of technical and academic journals, which he was able to resell to libraries at great profit. In 1947 he opened a second business in New York, Kraus Periodicals Inc., to specialize in the sale of runs of scholarly journals, and soon made an en bloc purchase of over 300,000 issues. In 1956, after he had received multiple orders for the same journals, Kraus opened a third business, the Kraus Reprint Corporation, that reprinted scientific and scholarly journals and reference books. The latter business was sold to Lord Thomson in 1965.

== End of the business ==
Kraus died on November 1, 1988, in Ridgefield, Connecticut, after which the business was carried on by his widow Hanni and their daughter and son-in-law, Mary Ann and Roland Folter. The business subsequently closed, and its remaining inventory and reference works were sold by Sotheby's.

== See also ==
The Holocaust in Austria

Aryanization

== Works ==
- Sir Francis Drake: A Pictorial Biography by Hans P. Kraus Online presentation for the Collections at the Library of Congress
