= John Hannyngton =

John Hannyngton may refer to:

- John Child Hannyngton, judge in the East India Company
- John Caulfield Hannyngton, his father, British military commander, actuary and mathematician
