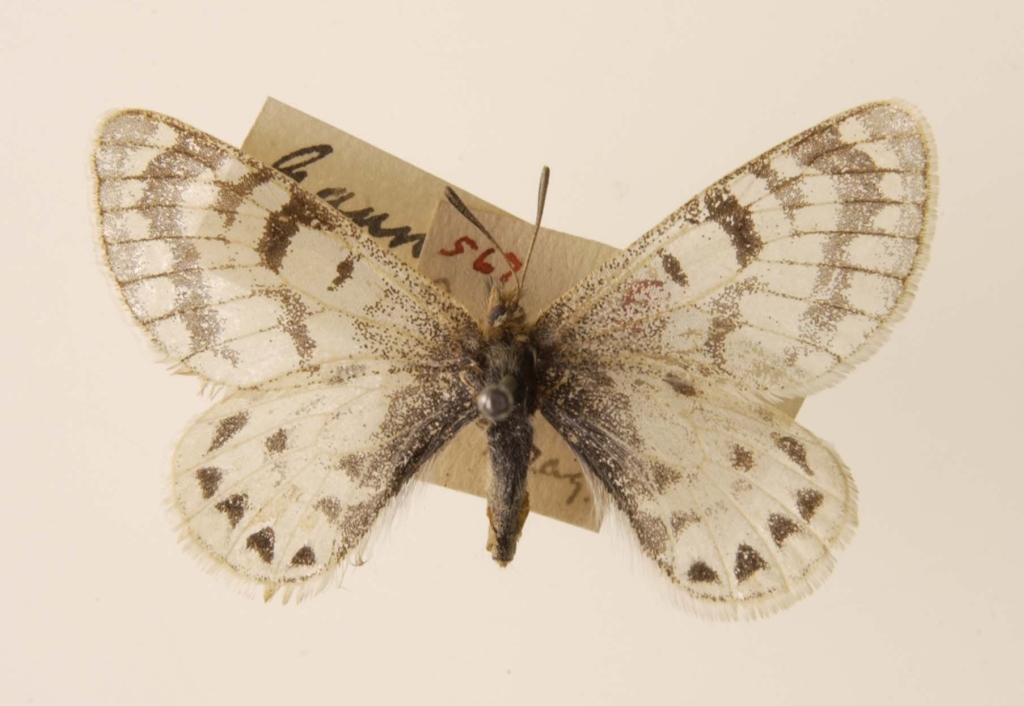

Scientific classification
- Kingdom: Animalia
- Phylum: Arthropoda
- Class: Insecta
- Order: Lepidoptera
- Family: Papilionidae
- Genus: Parnassius
- Species: P. hunnyngtoni

Binomial name
- Parnassius hunnyngtoni Avinoff, 1916

Synonyms
- Parnassius hannyngtoni Avinoff, 1916, after e.g. Hingston, 1927

= Parnassius hunnyngtoni =

Hannyngton's Apollo

Species of butterfly

Parnassius hunnyngtoni, the Hannyngton's Apollo, is a high-altitude butterfly which is found in India. It is a member of the snow Apollo genus (Parnassius) of the swallowtail family (Papilionidae). Some sources also spell the name as P. hunnygtoni. It is named after Frank Hannyngton who obtained the specimen from the Chumbi Valley.

== Range ==
Northern slope of central Himalaya (Tibet). Previously known from the Chumbi Valley, northern part of India (Sikkim) which currently is occupied by China. It may be in Bhutan.

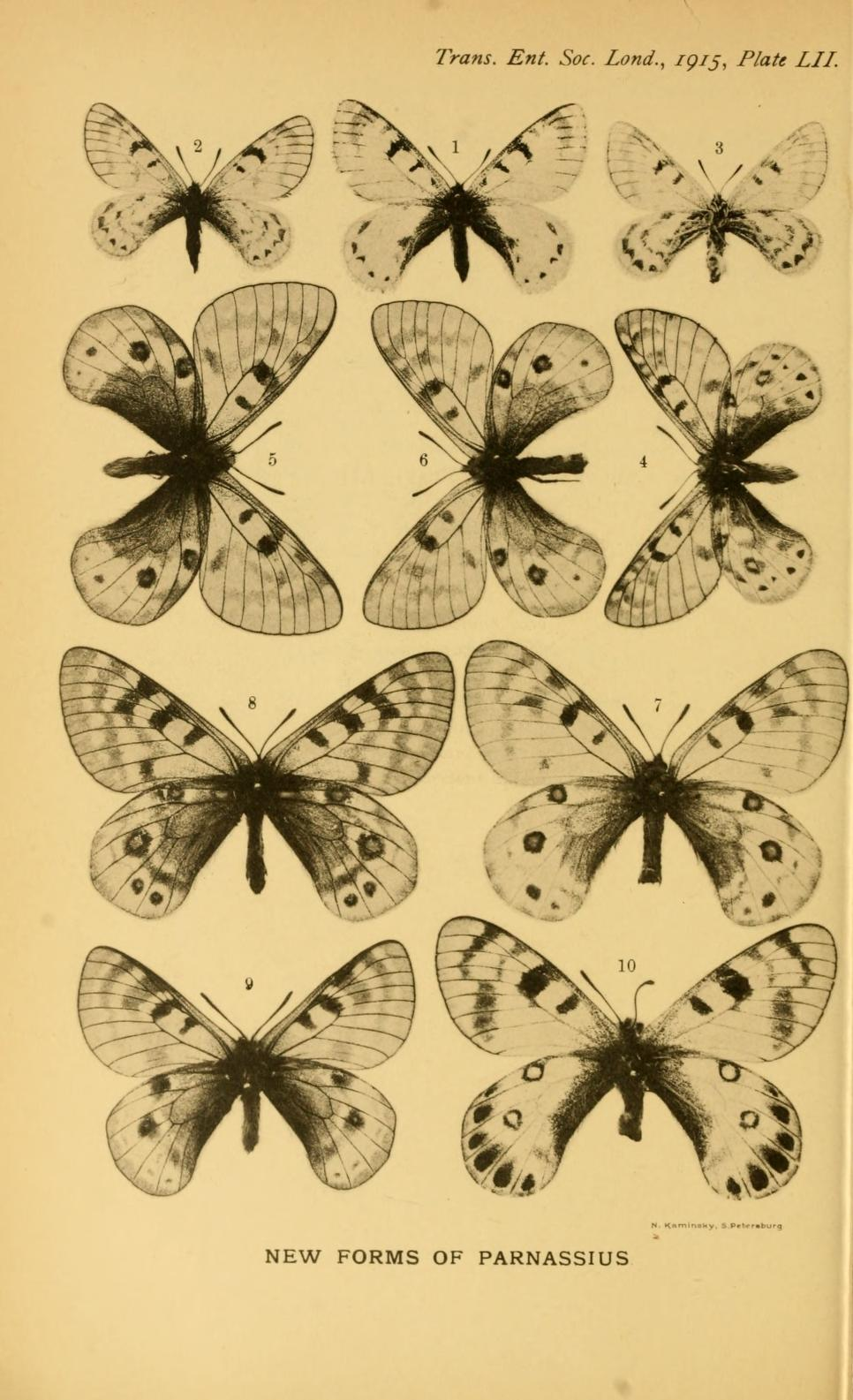
Fig 1 male, fig 2 female, fig 3 female underside

== Description ==
Original description by Andrey Avinoff:

I received this wonderful new species through the kindness of Mr. Hunnyngton, in honour of whom I have named this minute Parnassius. It comes from high elevations near the Chumbi Valley, South Tibet. Apparently this new species belongs to the acco-group, as may be seen by the corneous bag sphragis of the female and the characteristic white scaled veins of the slightly pinkish surface of the underside of the secondaries. Their pattern is very peculiar here, as seen by the figure. Especially conspicuous is the curved band of markings in the wing of the female. In the male this curved band of markings on the underside is incomplete. It is especially the three patches in the interspaces 2—5 and on that are marked the red scales lacking entirely on this species in both sexes on both surfaces. The inner outline of the basal dark part is parallel to the inner margin. A dark crescent in the cell seems to be formed by modified black outlines of the obliterated basal and anal red eyelets. The latter row of dark lunulae is similar to these markings of acco. The comparison of the dark basal area of hunnyngtoni and acco shows the former is very different as in the latter species this area has an irregular contour near the central cell. The upperside of the male presents a very strong reduction of dark markings compared with acco. There are three dark markings in the discocellular, and merely rudiments of the semi-transparent fuscous bands at the costal margin. The hindwing has no central markings at all, the whole pattern consisting of the submarginal lunulae on the black basal area. The markings in interspaces 5 and 7 are slightly seen on the upper surface, due to the transparency of the wing. The female has more developed dark markings. The two dark patches of the secondaries corresponding to the usual red eyelets are not large and stripe-like. The markings between them forming an uninterrupted curved band are seen only by transmitted light. The size of this species hardly reaches that of the smaller Parnassius simo forms. The cilia are very long and of the whitish ground-colour of the wings.The antennae are yellowish grey, gradually darkening at the extremity. The legs are pinkish. The corneous pouch of the female, being of the general shape and formation of that of acco is comparatively shorter and does not reach so far in surrounding the upper part of the body.

== Etymology ==
The species was described as Parnassius hunnyngtoni Avinoff, 1916. However (besides the suffix) the spelling of the species name as an honorific, differs from other spellings of the surname for Mr. Frank Hannyngton - stated as having provided the original specimens. The difference in spelling of 'hunnyngton' versus 'hannyngton' led some subsequent works to include the species name as the revised hannyngtoni. (e.g. Hingston, 1927). However, per ICZN 32.5, such later use is an unjustified subsequent emendation (as appeals to information beyond the scope of the original source). As such the published spelling of the scientific name remains. In the vernacular, using a spelling more appropriate to the intended honorific, such as "Hannyngton's Apollo" is appropriate, albeit possibly confusing.

== Status ==
This species is very rare and is protected by law in India.

== See also ==
- Papilionidae
- List of butterflies of India
- List of butterflies of India (Papilionidae)
