= Alex Shoumatoff =

American journalist and author (born 1946)

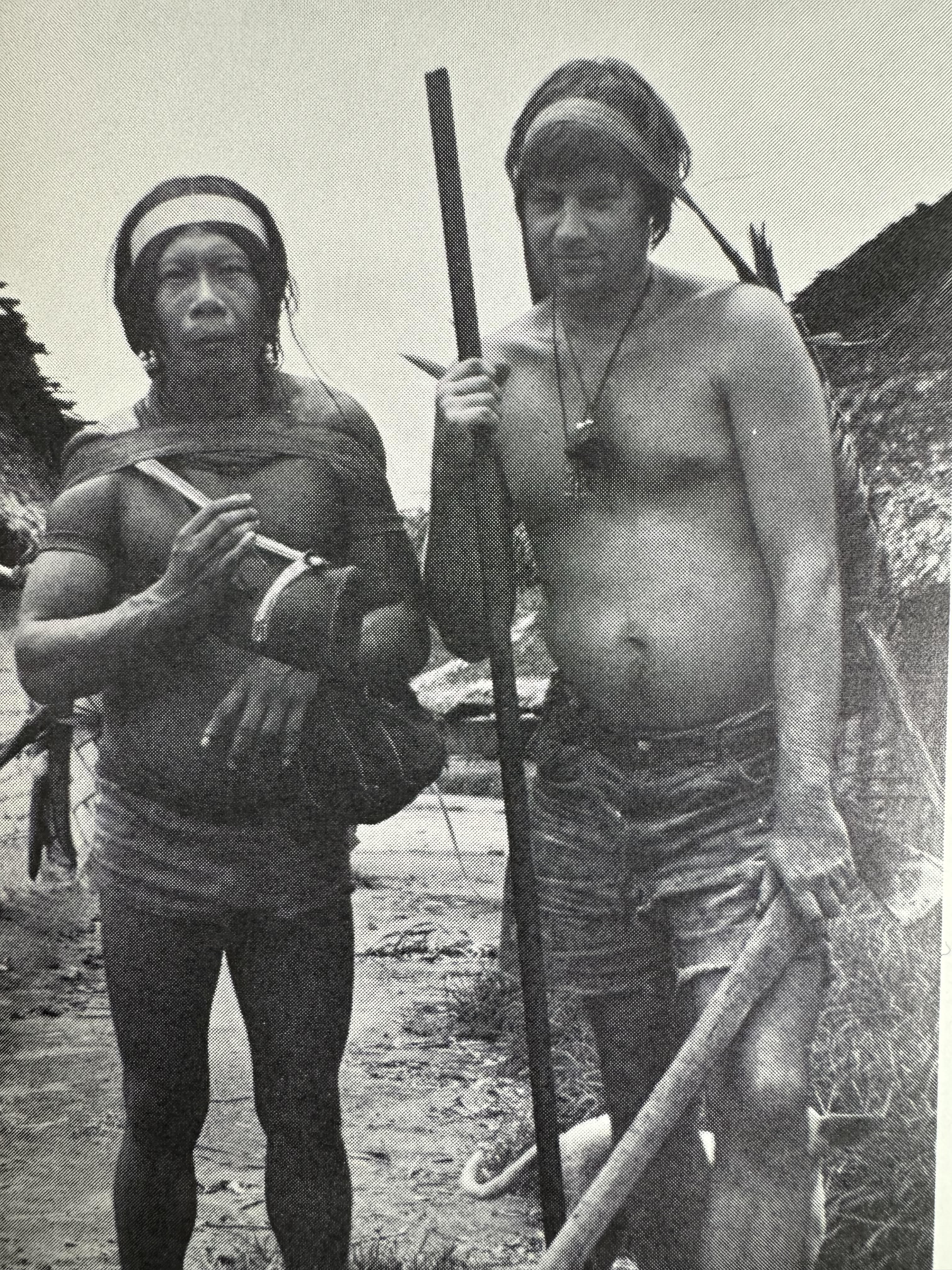
- Shoumatoff in the Amazon rainforest in 1976
- Born: Alexander Shoumatoff; November 4, 1946 (age 80); Mount Kisco, New York, U.S.
- Occupations: Magazine journalist, author
- Relatives: Elizabeth Shoumatoff (grandmother); Andrey Avinoff (great uncle)
- Writing career
- Period: 1970–2022
- Genres: Politics, dictators, the environment, places
- Website: dispatchesfromthevanishingworld.com

Alexander Shoumatoff (born November 4, 1946) is a journalist and author who was Vanity Fair's senior-most contributing editor from 1986 to 2015, and a staff writer at The New Yorker from 1978 to 1987. He has authored 11 books and was a founding contributing editor of Outside magazine and Condé Nast Traveler. Most of his books are extensions of his long-form journalism that has appeared in dozens of American and international magazines and other literary sources and collections.

For Vanity Fair, Shoumatoff covered international dictators in South America and Africa, as well as many political candidates in the United States since the 1990s, often before they chose to run for office, including John Kerry, Donald Trump, Bill Weld, Robert Kennedy Jr., and Al Gore.

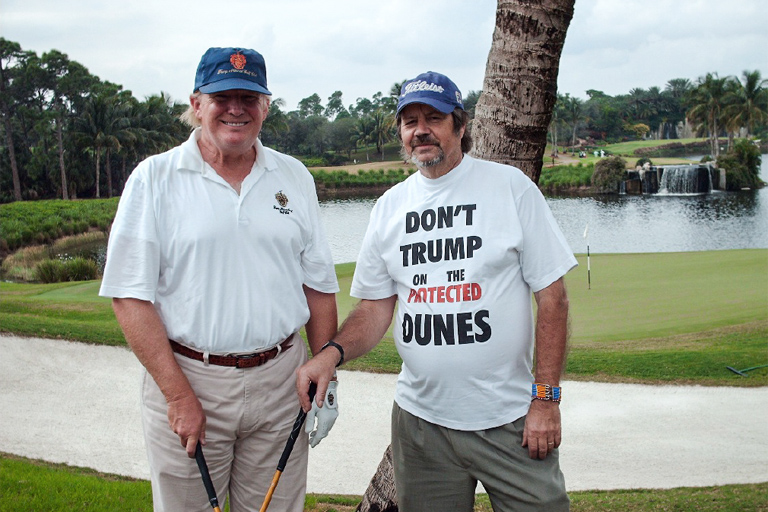
Shoumatoff covering Donald Trump for Vanity Fair in 2008, giving "the Trumpster a fair bit of ribbing."

In 1976, he spent six months in the Amazon rainforest where he was the first remote visitor to tribes that became his book Rivers Amazon which led to a long career in global journalism. In 1986, he wrote an article about the murder of Dian Fossey that was optioned to become the film Gorillas in the Mist.

Shoumatoff was called "consistently the farthest flung of the far-flung writers at The New Yorker" by The New York Times, "the greatest writer in America" by Donald Trump, and "one of our greatest storytellers" by Graydon Carter. He worked with noted magazine editors William Shawn at The New Yorker, who encouraged his long form writing, Tina Brown at Vanity Fair who encouraged him to cover international dictators, and Graydon Carter on an exceptionally wide-ranging subject of matter from camps in the Adirondacks to the largest art in history, originally stolen from the Nazis.

== Childhood ==
Shoumatoff grew up in the nearby town of Bedford, New York, a community known for famous people and business leaders. When he was four, his parents put him in a summer camp in Switzerland where he learned to speak French. He went to the local country-day school, Rippowam School, where he later taught middle-school science in his mid-twenties. After he graduated from eighth grade, his family moved to London and began to spend summers in Switzerland's Bernese Oberland. His father, a passionate mountain climber, took Shoumatoff and his older brother Nick up major peaks in the Alps.

Shoumatoff's secondary schooling was at St. Paul's School, then an all-boys boarding school in Concord, New Hampshire, where he was at the top of his class and the captain of the squash team. His friends included future Presidential candidate John Kerry who he eventually profiled in 1996.

When he was 16, impressed by the recordings of South Carolina bluesman Pink Anderson, he bought a guitar and went to the Folklore Center in Greenwich Village, New York, where Bob Dylan got his break. Izzy Young sent him to Harlem to take lessons from the Reverend Gary Davis. Davis would eventually have a great personal impact on Shoumatoff and became the subject of Shoumatoff's first published magazine piece.

Shoumatoff was admitted to Harvard University in 1964, as a sophomore where he studied poetry writing with Robert Lowell in a class that included fellow literary journalist Tracy Kidder. He was on The Harvard Lampoon and his senior-year roommates included Douglas Kenney, founder of National Lampoon whose work included the films Animal House and Caddyshack and was a national-champion squash player.

Shoumatoff descends from a family of Russian nobility that he traced back dozens of generations in his 1982 book Russian Blood. The Shoumatoff family were originally Baltic German Schumacher and had migrated to St. Petersburg and been ennobled under Peter the Great.

Shoumatoff's paternal grandmother, Elizabeth Shoumatoff, was the portrait artist who was painting President Franklin Roosevelt in 1945 when he collapsed before her and died and was a household name during his childhood.

Shoumatoff's great uncle, Andrey Avinoff, who served as the father-figure for his father, was a diplomat and "gentleman-in-waiting" to Csar Nicholas II at the time of the Soviet Revolution, served as the translator of Russian for the Treaty of Versailles, was likely the world's top lepidopterist through the 1920s in expeditions as far as to Tibet which were financed by Nicholas II, and was the director of the Carnegie Museum of Natural History in Pittsburgh from 1925 to 1945. By his death, Avinoff was considered one of America's most prominent Russian-Americans and was profiled in 1948 by The New Yorker.

His paternal grandfather, Leo Shoumatoff, was the business manager of Igor Sikorsky's aircraft company who developed the first passenger airplane, the Pan Am Clipper, and the helicopter.

His father, Nicholas Shoumatoff, was an engineer who designed many of the paper mills around the world, and was an entomologist and well-known alpine ecologist who wrote the books Europe's Mountain Center and Around the Roof of the World.

== Early writing and music career ==
After a stint at The Washington Post as a night police reporter, and with a draft classification of I-A, he enlisted into a Marine Corps reserve intelligence unit that trained him to be parachuted behind the Iron Curtain to melt into the local population. He was given Russian Language schooling in Monterey, California. There, however, he fell in with the psychedelic counterculture of the late 1960s. He turned to his New York City guitar teacher, the Reverend Gary Davis and Davis made him a minister in a heated moment in a store-front church in Harlem. This enabled him to get an honorable, IV-D discharge from the Marines, the D standing for Divinity, and allowed him to avoid having to go to Vietnam.

In 1969, rather than returning to The Washington Post to become their Moscow correspondent under editor Ben Bradlee, Shoumatoff chose to "drop out" with his girlfriend and they moved to an old farm in New Hampshire. He taught French at a local college, drove a school bus and under heavy cannabis use and was engrossed in nature. Breaking up with his girlfriend that fall, he drifted to northern California, spending time at a succession of communes and playing music around bonfires and writing more songs. There, he sold his profile of Gary Davis to Rolling Stone and got a song-writing contract with Manny Greenhill, the manager of Joan Baez, Joni Mitchell, Muddy Waters, Doc Watson, and others.

He went to New York City to perform his songs but instead ended up writing for magazines, starting with The Village Voice. He developed a piece on Florida into his first book, Florida Ramble, and married his editor's assistant. The newlyweds lived in the Marsh Sanctuary in Mount Kisco, where he became the resident naturalist. The marriage lasted only two years and Shoumatoff, after turning in his second book, a natural and cultural history of Westchester County, New York, left for the Amazon rainforest. There, he spent nine months, getting to remote Yanomamo villages that no one from the outside world had seen, and nearly died of falciparum malaria. His book on the experience,The Rivers Amazon, was compared by reviewers with the classic exploration books of the Amazon by Theodore Roosevelt and Henry Walter Bates and was excerpted in Reader's Digest.

Returning to Mount Kisco with a Brazilian wife, the Westchester book was excerpted by The New Yorker and he joined their staff in 1978, and had an office across the hall from naturalist Bill McKibben. Shoumatoff established himself as "consistently one of the farthest-flung of The New Yorker's far-flung correspondents", as The New York Times described him, and he wrote pieces on pygmies in the Ituri Forest, lemurs of Madagascar, and traced the legend of Amazon women to a tributary of the Amazon called the Nhamunda, which no white person had visited since a Frenchman in 1890. By then, Shoumatoff was considered a rising literary star in New York, his associates included George Plimpton, and he shared a birthday party with singer Art Garfunkel in 1984.

== Journalistic techniques ==
The essayist Edward Hoagland described him as "admirably protean, encyclopedic, and indefatigable, Shoumatoff has the curiosity of an army of researchers and writes like a house afire."

Shoumatoff is known for his style of long fact writing which was developed at The New Yorker under the editorship of William Shawn. Shawn encouraged his writers to pursue their interests in exhaustive detail, a practice used to provide comprehensive reporting about often little-known but fascinating and important subjects, and to fill the demand of magazine's weekly print pages. Shoumatoff began recording his thoughts into the pages of little red Chinese notebooks, which there are hundreds of today.

Most of Shoumatoff's books are of a place (a state, a county, a rainforest, a desert, etc) and usually originated with a magazine article, which are a mixture of travelogue and exposition of elements that Shoumatoff believes make the place the way it is: flora and fauna; natural, cultural, and political history; local dialects and belief systems. His writing is often characterized by a fascination with "The Other", a disenchantment with the modern consumer culture, and exhaustive amount of detail that he developed at The New Yorker. He work frequently crossed into territory of anthropologists and specialists on species, cultures, and music.

== Career in the 1980s and 1990s ==
In 1986, Shoumatoff wrote his first piece for Vanity Fair, about the murder of Dian Fossey. He was considered to be one of the newly resurrected magazine's stars by then-editor Tina Brown. He wrote an account of the fall of Paraguay's dictator Alfredo Stroessner, which was the sole subject of Brown's introduction to the issue. His associates and fellow contributing editors at the magazine included Christopher Hitchens, James Wolcott, Carl Bernstein, Sebastian Junger, and many other of the top writers in America and Britain.

In 1987, Shoumatoff attempted to pinpoint the source of HIV in central Africa which was developed into the book African Madness.

In 1990, his book The World Is Burning about the murder of Chico Mendes was optioned to become a movie by Robert Redford. He also married Rosette Rwigamba, a Rwandan Tutsi, in her village in Uganda, to whom he remains married.

In the early 1990s, Shoumatoff became heavily interested in golf, and had a column in Esquire called "Investigative Golf." His pieces included a 1994 article about President Bill Clinton where his golf partners heavily discussed Clinton's extra-marital affairs prior to the Monica Lewinsky scandal, and O. J. Simpson's golf partners who believed Simpson may have hidden the murder weapon in his golf bag. He also profiled Uma Thurman and her father, Buddhist scholar Robert Thurman, for a cover feature in Vanity Fair. During this era, Shoumatoff appeared on Inside Edition and E! True Hollywood Story television tabloid shows.

In 1997, his book Legends of the American Desert: Sojourns in the Greater Southwest (1997) was on the cover of The New York Times Book Review and Time's and the New York Post's lists of the top ten books of 1997. He also wrote about global warming and the United States' failure to ratify the Kyoto Protocol.

== Later career ==
In 2000, Vanity Fair selected Shoumatoff to profile Democratic presidential candidate Al Gore, whom he had gone to university with, before the election. The magazine eventually decided not to publish the piece as they felt Gore was "too dull.",

In 2001, Shoumatoff started a web site, Dispatches From The Vanishing World, with his son Andre, to strengthen his focus on the environment and create a written record of the places, cultures and living species he reported on during his career. Shoumatoff believed that many of the places that he had been writing about since the 1970s had been drastically changed by the West's appetite for goods.

In late 2008, Shoumatoff was arrested for sneaking into the Bohemian Grove for a piece that was published by Vanity Fair. He also recorded his only musical album with longtime friend Kate McGarrigle, the mother of Rufus Wainwright and Martha Wainwright, that was featured on NPR's weekend edition of All Things Considered during the Pennsylvania primary for the 2008 primary election.

In 2015, he profiled for Vanity Fair the discovery of the greatest art theft in history by Hildebrand Gurlitt from the Nazis.

In 2017, Shoumatoff published his latest book, The Wasting of Borneo.

Shoumatoff has lived in Montreal since 1998 and is still writing, working primarily with magazines such as Smithsonian and is active on speaker circuits about writing.

== Books ==
- Florida Ramble. New York: Harper & Row. 1974. ISBN 978-0-06-013858-5.
- The Rivers Amazon. San Francisco: Sierra Club Books. 1978. ISBN 978-0-87156-210-4.
- The Capital of Hope. New York: Coward, McCann & Geoghegan. 1978. ISBN 978-0-698-11048-9.
- Westchester, Portrait of a County. New York: Coward, McCann & Geoghegan. 1979. ISBN 978-0-698-10925-4.
- Russian Blood. New York: Coward, McCann & Geoghegan. 1982. ISBN 978-0-698-11139-4.
- The Mountain of Names. New York: Simon and Schuster. 1985. ISBN 978-0-671-49440-7.
- In Southern Light: Trekking through Zaire and the Amazon. New York: Simon and Schuster. 1986. ISBN 978-0-671-49441-4.
- African Madness. New York: A.A. Knopf. 1988. ISBN 978-0-394-56914-7.
- The World is Burning. Boston: Little, Brown. 1990. ISBN 978-0-316-78739-0.
- Legends of the American Desert: Sojourns in the Greater Southwest. New York: Knopf. 1997. ISBN 978-0-394-56915-4.
- The Wasting of Borneo: Dispatches from a Vanishing World. Boston: Beacon Press. 2017. ISBN 978-0-8070-7824-2.
