= Elizabeth Shoumatoff =

Ukrainian-American painter (1888–1980)

- Born: Elizabeth Avinoff; October 6, 1888; Kharkov, Kharkov Governorate, Russian Empire (modern Kharkiv, Kharkiv Oblast, Ukraine)
- Died: November 30, 1980 (aged 92); Glen Cove, New York, United States
- Occupation: Portrait Artist
- Known for: Unfinished portrait of President Roosevelt (FDR)
- Notable work: Portraits of FDR, President Johnson
- Spouse: Leo Shoumatoff (until 1928)
- Relatives: Andrey Avinoff (brother), Alex Shoumatoff (grandson), Antonia Shoumatoff (granddaughter)

Elizabeth Nikolaevna Shoumatoff, née Avinoff, (October 6, 1888 – November 30, 1980) was a portrait painter who painted the unfinished portrait of Franklin D. Roosevelt. Other paintings of White House residents include portraits of President Lyndon B. Johnson and Lady Bird Johnson. She painted renowned American business leaders such as Richard K. Mellon of the Mellon Bank, Thomas J. Watson, Sr. of IBM, Robert W. Woodruff of Coca-Cola, Harvey Firestone, the Hunts, the Heinzes and the Duponts.

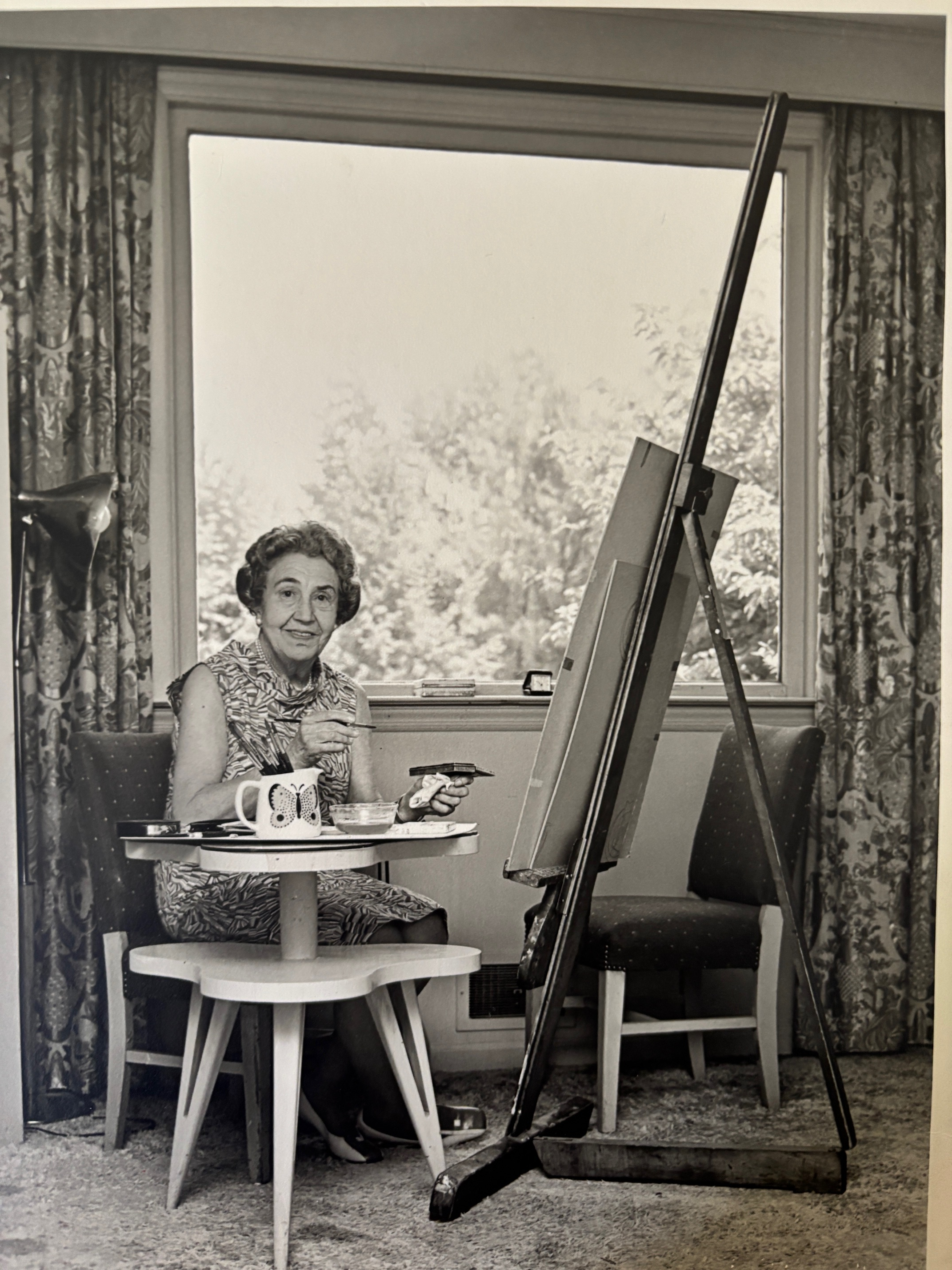
Madame Elizabeth Shoumatoff at her Long Island Studio, photo George H. Meyer

Shoumatoff painted multiple generations of prominent families such as Fricks, Whitneys, Phipps and countless others. She also painted international leaders, including William Tubman, president of Liberia, Rabindranath Tagore the Nobel Prize-winning Bengali poet, the grandchildren of Charlotte, Grand Duchess of Luxembourg and Anne Cox Chambers, U.S. Ambassador to Belgium.

== Early life ==
Shoumatoff was born in Kharkov on October 6, 1888, the youngest child of an aristocratic family in what was then Imperial Russia. Her father, Nikolai Aleksandrovich Avinov (1844–1911) was a lieutenant-general in the Imperial Russian Army.

Shoumatoff's eldest sibling Nikolai, a professor of fiscal law, was the Assistant Minister of Interior Affairs in the Russian Provisional Government under Kerensky. He was the only member of the family to remain in Russia after the Russian Revolution and was executed during the Stalinist purge of 1937. Her next oldest brother Andrey Avinoff was a prominent entomologist and artist who became the Director of the Carnegie Museum of Natural History in Pittsburgh, Pennsylvania. Elizabeth Shoumatoff emigrated to the United States just before October Revolution with her family. Her husband, Leo Shoumatoff, became the business manager of Sikorsky Aircraft Company in its early years. The family lived in Merrick, Long Island.

== Career ==
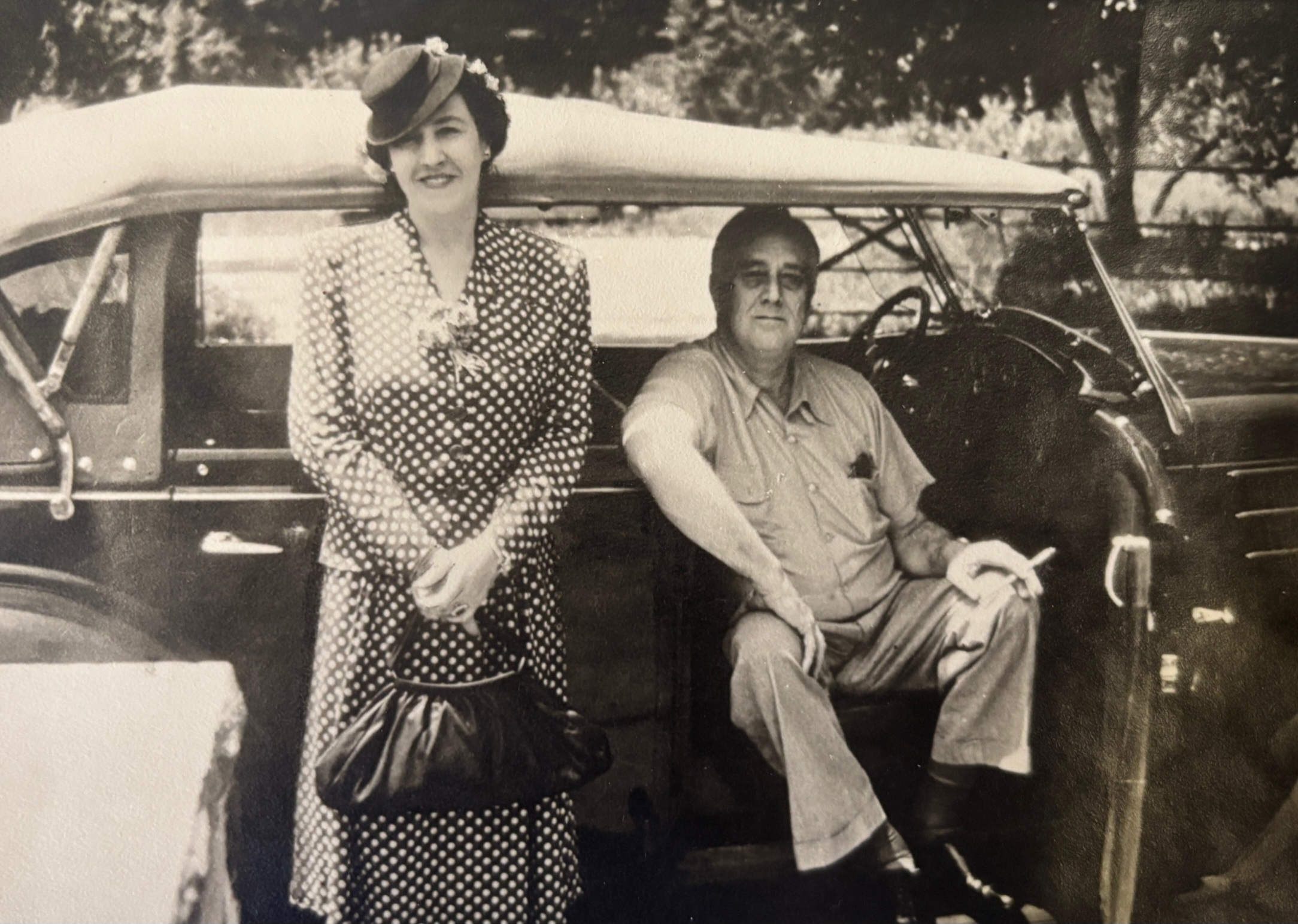
Madame Shoumatoff with FDR

Shoumatoff's extraordinary talent for portraiture brought commissions from some of the most illustrious families in America, Great Britain and Europe. She painted over 3,000 portraits in sixty years over her lifetime. President Franklin D. Roosevelt was sitting for her at the Little White House in Warm Springs, Georgia, when he suffered a fatal cerebral hemorrhage on April 12, 1945. While she was painting his portrait, he exclaimed: "I have a terrific headache." The original unfinished portrait hangs in the Little White House in Warm Springs and a finished copy commissioned for the Oval Office by President Lyndon B. Johnson is part of the White House collection. Johnson, who had famously rejected Peter Hurd's prior portrait of him, approved Shoumatoff's painting as his official presidential portrait.

== Death and legacy ==
A longtime resident of Locust Valley, New York, Shoumatoff died in November 1980 aged 92. Her estate donated some sketches related to the Unfinished Portrait to the Franklin D. Roosevelt Presidential Library and Museum in Hyde Park, New York. Some of her other works and materials from the latter part of her life are in the Archives of American Art. Elizabeth is buried in Locust Valley Cemetery, Locust Valley, New York.

== Gallery ==
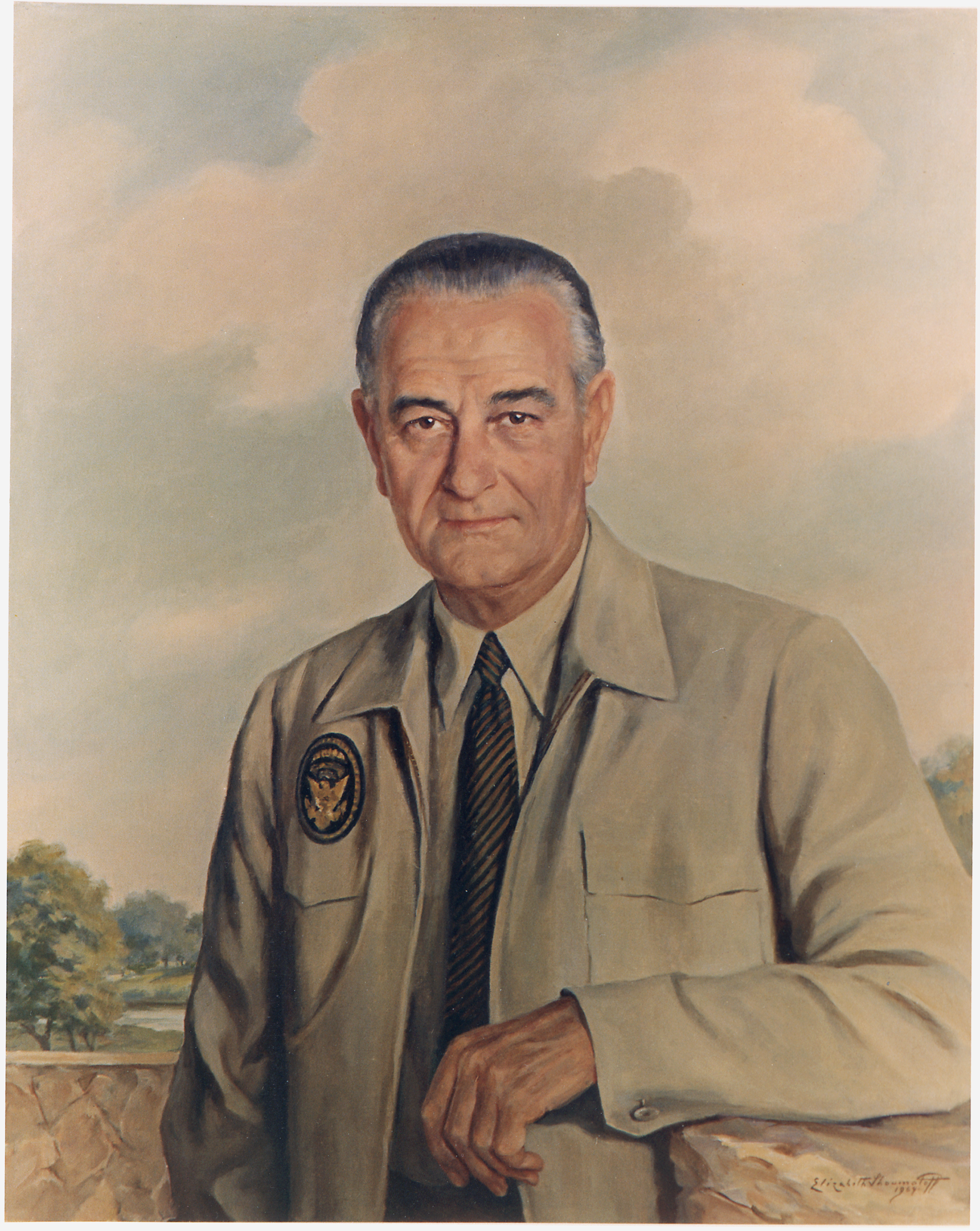
Portrait of Lyndon Baines Johnson, oil paint, 1969.

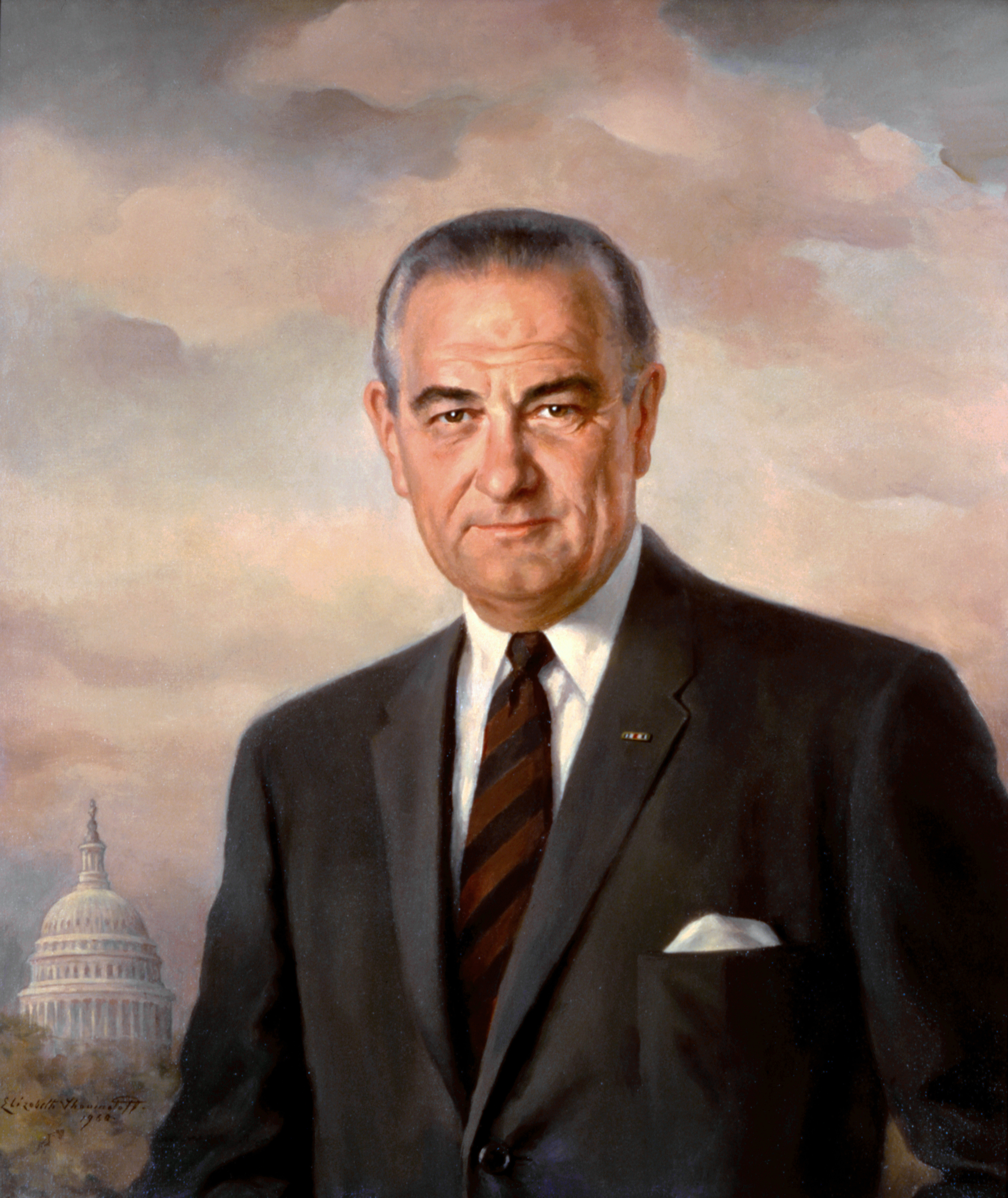
Official Presidential portrait of Lyndon Baines Johnson, 1968.

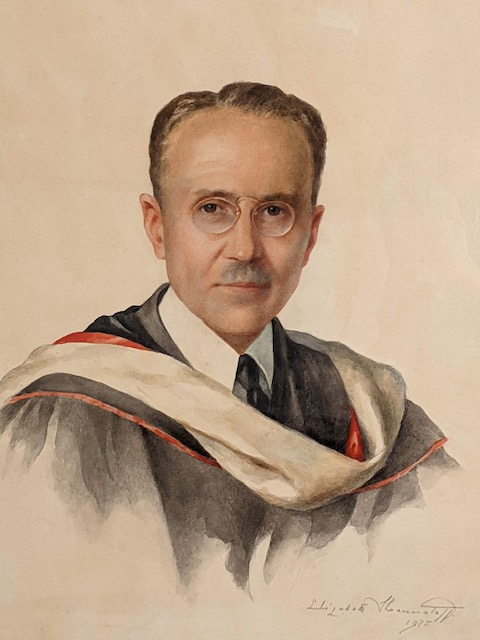
Watercolor portrait of Shoumatoff's brother, Andrey Avinoff, 1975.

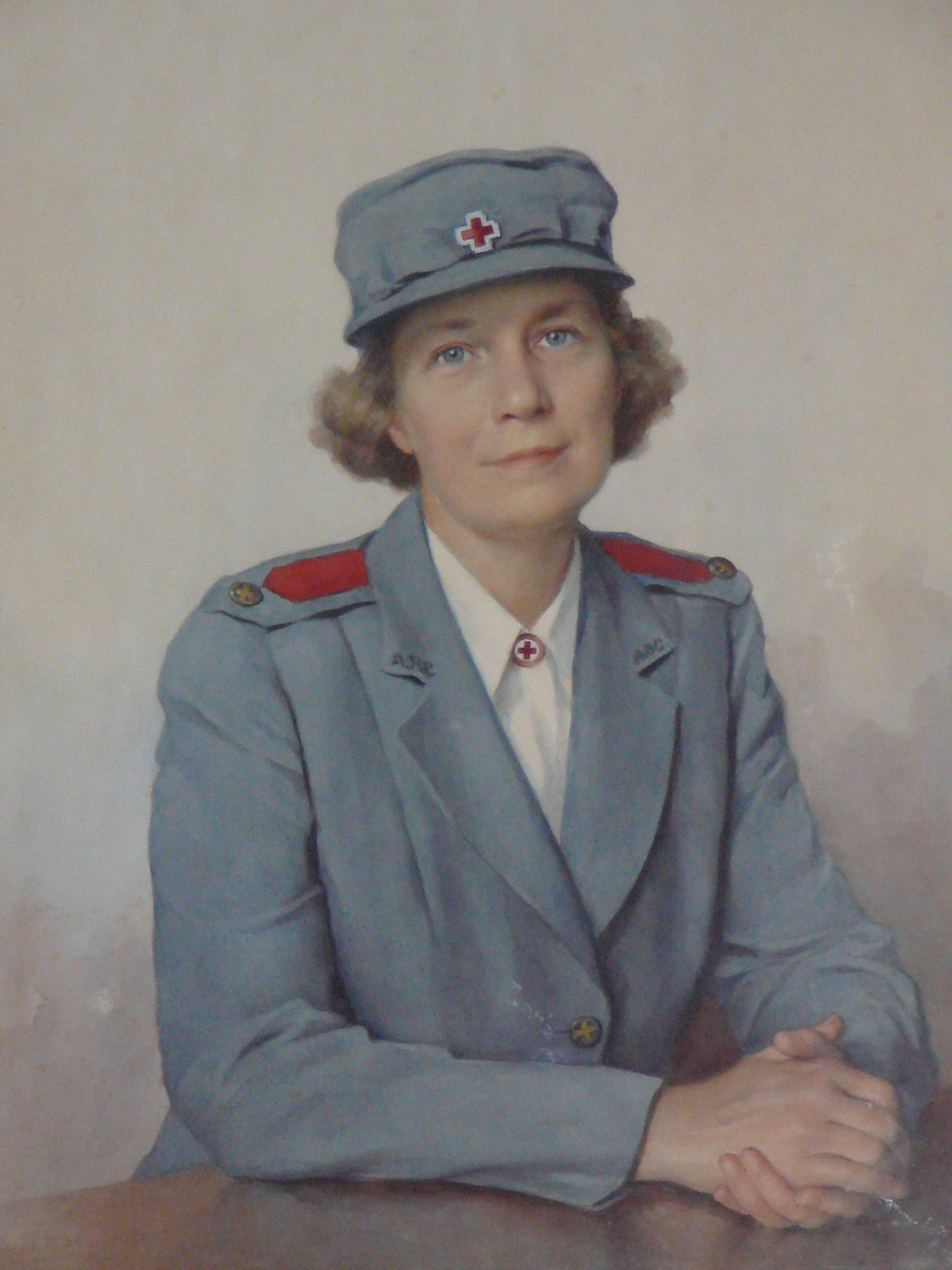
Portrait of Ethel Roosevelt Derby, oil paint.
