= Simeon J. Bolan =

Russian book dealer

Simeon Joachimovich Bolan (April 23, 1896 – February 16, 1972) was a Russian-born book dealer in New York, specializing in Russian-language books.

== Biography ==
Bolan was born in Russia and emigrated to the United States around 1915, where he became a naturalized citizen. He began his career as a book dealer in 1926, buying books from individual book dealers as well as Russian organizations like Mezhdunarodnaya Kniga (International Book) and Amtorg. He established a relationship with Harvard University, selling 8000 books to their library between 1928 and 1938.

Bolan and the book dealer Israel Perlstein were the two main suppliers of Russian books to the Library of Congress from the late 1920s to the 1930s. Bolan's sales to the Library were primarily illustrative materials ("chertezhi i risunki"), from imperial collections. While working for Perlstein in 1941, Bolan sold 10,000 books to the collector Paul M. Fekula. He also was the main supplier of Russian books to the collector Bayard L. Kilgour Jr., whose collection was later donated to the Houghton Library at Harvard.

Around 1946, he worked as an employee of H.P. Kraus, producing catalogs of Russian books at Kraus’ office on 16 East 46th St. Bolan was the subject of an FBI investigation in 1957, following his request to visit the Soviet Union. Following his retirement from the rare book trade, he joined Columbia University Libraries in October 1947 as Russian Bibliographer and Searcher. He later served as the first Slavic and Eastern European Librarian at the University until 1956. At Columbia, Bolan traded materials with a Russian library, exchanging four letters by Lenin, as well as papers by Maxim Gorky, in exchange for 15,000 Russian-language periodicals. Grigory Aleksinsky claimed that Bolan attempted to purchase some of Lenin's papers in Aleksinsky's possession for $20,000. Around 1956, Bolan returned to the book dealing business, establishing the Slavia Book Company at 115 University Place.
