= Andrey Avinoff =

Artist and lepidopterist (1884–1949)

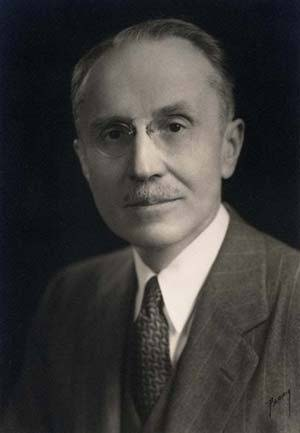
- Born: 14 February 1884; Tulchyn, Podolia Governorate
- Died: 16 July 1949 (aged 65); New York City, US
- Resting place: Locust Valley Cemetery, Locust Valley, New York, U.S.
- Education: University of Pittsburgh
- Occupation: Museum Director (Carnegie Museum of Natural History)
- Known for: Polymathic Artistry; Treaty of Versailles; Painting
- Relatives: Elizabeth Shoumatoff (sister), Alex Shoumatoff (grandnephew)
- Scientific career
- Fields: Lepidopterology; Entomology; Museology

Andrey Avinoff (14 February 1884 – 16 July 1949) was an internationally-known artist, lepidopterist, museum director, professor, bibliophile and iconographer, who served as the director of the Carnegie Museum of Natural History in Pittsburgh from 1926 to 1945.

Throughout his life he engaged with prominent thinkers, explorers, authors, scientists, and educators throughout the world. Perhaps more than any other Russian émigré of his period, he epitomized the cultural sophistication of pre-revolutionary Russia. He has been firmly established by curatorial experts as one of the most important artists in America from the Russian Silver Age of Art, Mir iskusstva (World of Art). In an age of specialization, Avinoff brought an interdisciplinary approach to a broad range of fields, demonstrating the connections between culture, nature, spirituality, and art history.

Avinoff amassed the largest collection of Asiatic butterflies in the world discovering and naming several new species of butterflies in Central Asia, including several variations of the genus Parnassius found in the Himalayan regions. He won the coveted Gold Medal of the Imperial Geographical Society for his work and published seven articles in three languages about his discoveries.

Avinoff was a generation older than the famed Russian-born novelist Vladimir Nabokov, himself a distinguished lepidopterist. In his novel Dar ("The Gift"), Nabokov based the character Konstantin Godunov-Cherdyntsev, his formidable Central Asian butterfly collector, partially on Avinoff. According to Kurt Johnson and Steve Coates's book Nabokov's Blues (1999), Avinoff was one of the first people Nabokov contacted when he came to the United States.

Lecturing as an adjunct professor in the departments of fine arts and biology at the University of Pittsburgh, Avinoff was renowned as an expert on decorative arts, Persian art, nature motifs, and Russian iconography. His book collection, the largest compendium of Russian decorative arts volumes outside of Russia, is now housed at the Hillwood Museum in Washington, D.C. It provided the basis for 'The Icon and the Axe' (1966), a comprehensive study of Russian culture by James H. Billington, then Librarian of Congress.

Avinoff became known as the leading botanical painter of the day. He illustrated numerous books and folios and was called "one of the greatest American flower painters of the 20th century" by John Walker, then director of the National Gallery of Art in Washington, D.C. Walker acquired two of Avinoff's watercolor paintings for the National Gallery collection, Emergence (c. 1948, watercolor, ink, and pencil on paperboard) and Tulips (Disintegration) (c. 1949, watercolor and pencil on paperboard).

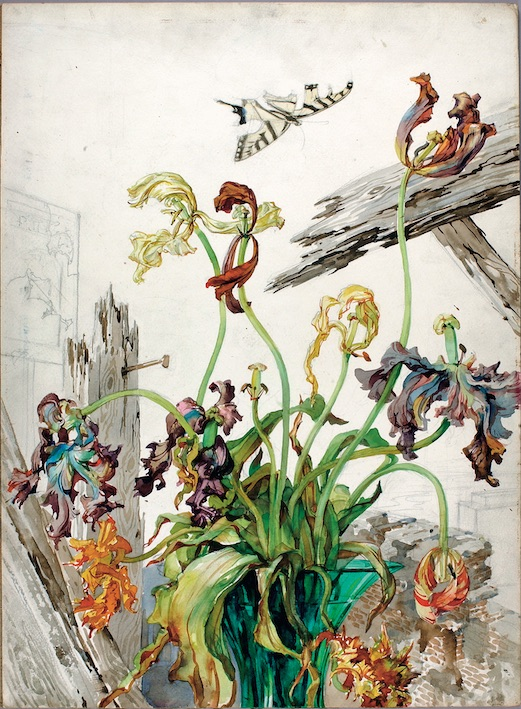
Tulips (“Disintegration”), National Gallery of Art, Gift by Elizabeth Shoumatoff, 1956

From 1947 on Avinoff maintained a close friendship with the biologist and sex researcher Alfred Kinsey, based in part on their similar entomological interests; Kinsey's early scientific work was with gall wasps. Until Avinoff's death, the two collaborated on several projects, including an unpublished study on the sexuality of individuals in the arts.

== Early life and career in Russia ==
Andrey Avinoff was born in Tulchyn in what is now Ukraine, into an aristocratic Russian family going back to the boyars of Novgorod. He was the grandson of Admiral Alexander Avinoff, who fought at the Battle of Trafalgar (1805), and a great-grandson of Vladimir Panaieff (Panayev), minister of the Imperial Court during the reign (1825–1855) of Tsar Nicholas I, under whom Panaeff acquired art for the Hermitage Museum and what became the New Hermitage Museum collection in 1852.

Andrey, his sister Elizabeth Shoumatoff, and brother Nicholas Avinov were taught perfect English, French, and German by governesses and tutors. After graduating from Moscow State University with a degree in law (1905), Avinoff was appointed assistant secretary general of the Governing Senate, and in 1911 was named gentleman-in-waiting to the court of Tsar Nicholas II, serving in the Diplomatic Corps as director of ceremonies.

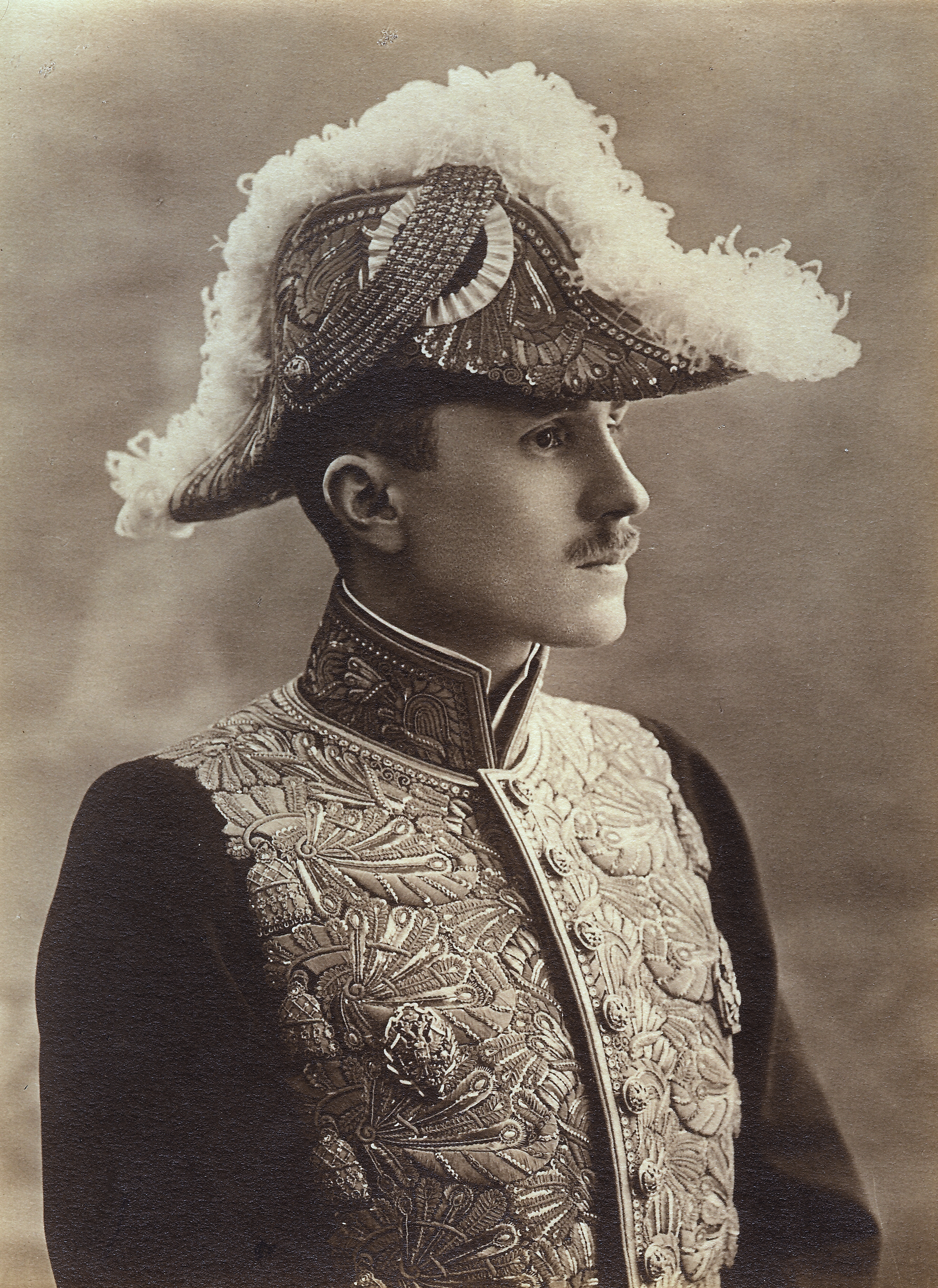
Andrey Avinoff in court dress c. 1910. Shoumatoff Collection, public domain.

In 1915, during World War I, Avinoff went to New York as an emissary of the Zemsky Union, an organization similar to the Red Cross, on a mission to purchase military supplies for the Imperial Army during World War I. He was back in New York on a second mission, representing the Provisional Government, when the October Revolution of 1917 broke out. Avinoff telegraphed his family to leave Russia immediately. Except for his older brother, Nicholas, and Nicholas' wife Marie Avinov, the entire family, including governesses, took the last Trans-Siberian Railway train eastward across Russia and crossed the Pacific by steamer to embark upon a new life in the United States. Nicholas Avinoff was then serving as the Assistant Minister of Interior Affairs in the Kerensky Provisional Government. He was subsequently imprisoned a number of times and finally executed by the secret police during the Yezhov Purge of 1937. He is described in R. H. Bruce Lockhart's Memoirs of a British Agent (1932). Marie Avinov was one of the few Russian aristocrats to survive the Bolshevik Revolution, Stalin's Great Purge, and the German invasion during World War II; she recounted her ordeal in Marie Avinov: Pilgrimage through Hell (1968).

== In the United States ==
Left only with what they had been able to carry with them, Avinoff's family initially purchased a farm in Pine Bush, New York. Avinoff's brief, none-too-successful farming career came to an end in late 1918 when he was summoned by Prince Georgy Lvov to translate for him, first in Washington, DC, at Lvov's meeting with President Woodrow Wilson, and then at Versailles, where Avinoff helped negotiate the Treaty of Versailles for the Russian Provisional Government at the Paris Peace Conference.

In February 1919, Avinoff returned to Pine Bush, where his family had become frequent visitors at nearby Yama Farms Inn, a fashionable Catskills resort that attracted Thomas Edison, Harvey Firestone, Henry Ford, and John D. Rockefeller as well as famous writers, musicians and philosophers. Frank Seaman, the advertising mogul who established the Inn, helped launch Avinoff's career as a commercial artist. Avinoff rendered advertising illustrations for the products of many major companies of the day, including Colgate-Palmolive's Cashmere Bouquet, and the first modern typewriter for the Underwood Typewriter Company.

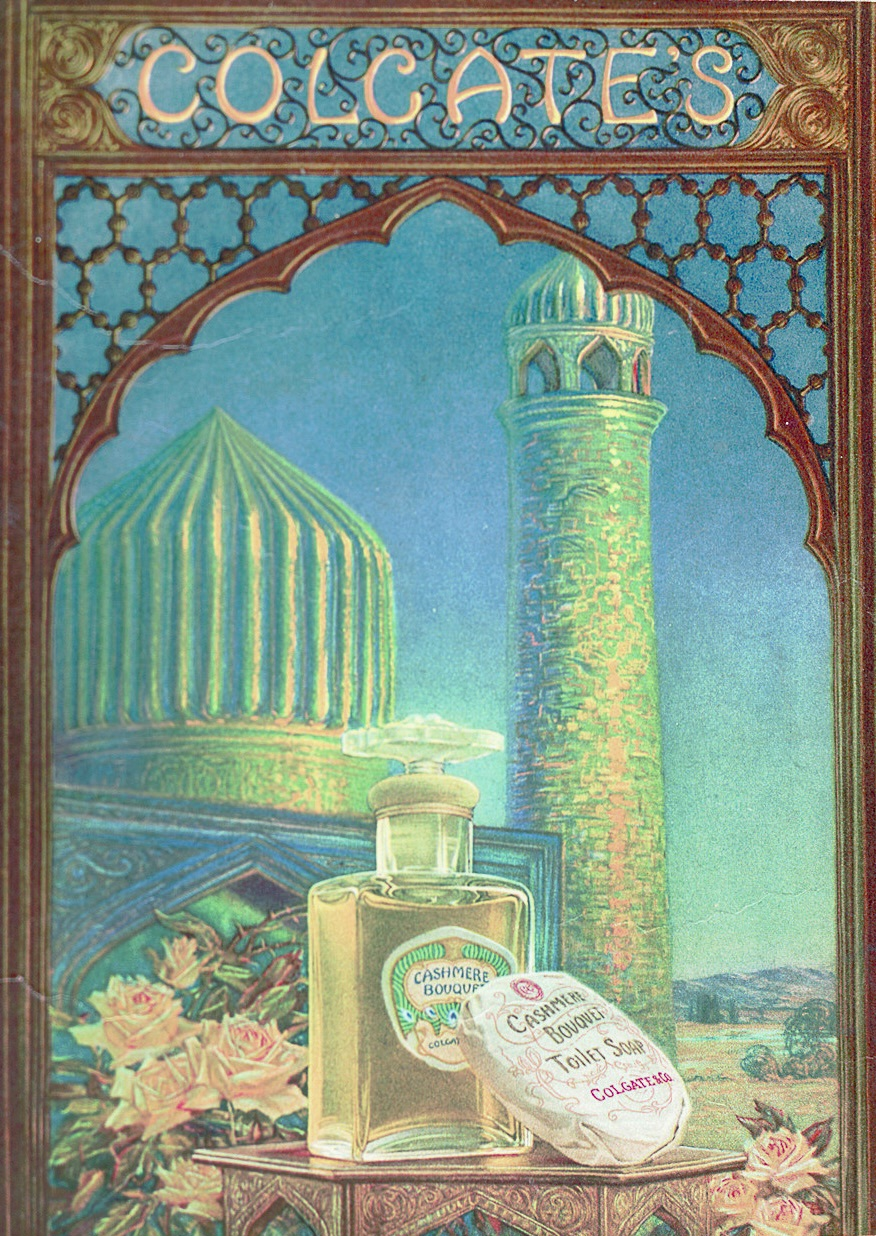
Cashmere Bouquet soap advertisement, commissioned by Colgate’s. Avinoff, c. 1923.

Seaman also helped inaugurate the portrait-painting career of Avinoff's sister, Elizabeth Shoumatoff, by arranging for her to paint many of his wealthy clients. The family sold the farm in 1920 but remained in the vicinity, living in a colonial mansion in Napanoch until 1926, when they moved to Merrick, Long Island. Avinoff's sister, Elizabeth Shoumatoff, would become the renowned portrait painter of the Unfinished Portrait of Franklin Delano Roosevelt rendered at his death in 1945. She painted over 3,000 portraits of industrialists, international leaders and members of some of the most celebrated society families in the United States. Elizabeth's husband, Leo Shoumatoff, had become the business manager for Igor Sikorsky's airplane company. Avinoff designed the "Winged S," the first logo for Sikorsky Aircraft, and other early promotional artwork for the then-fledgling company.

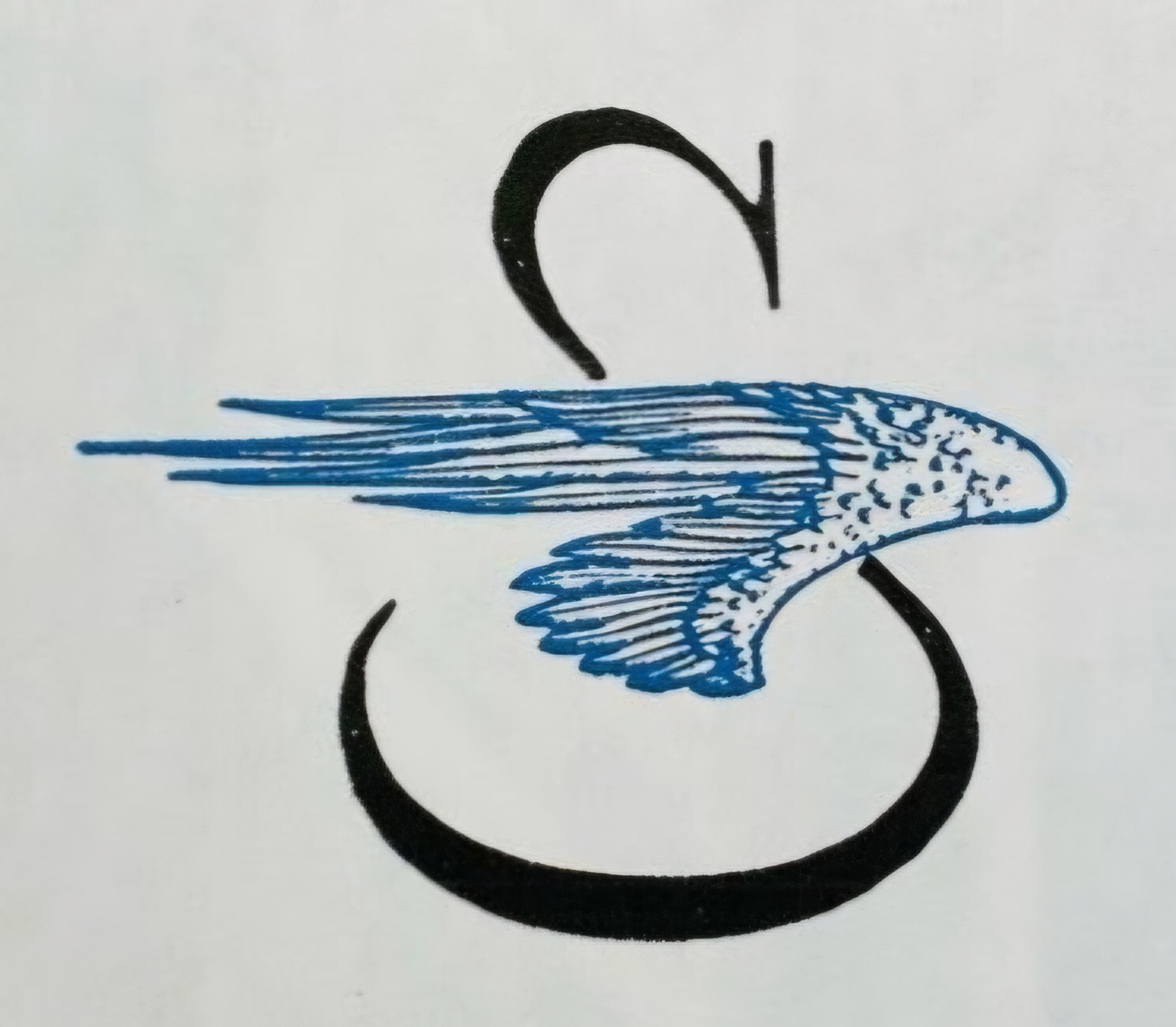
Avinoff's logo design for the Sikorsky S-38, 1928.

His reputation as a lepidopterist had drawn the attention of the zoologist Dr. William J. Holland, who headed up both the Carnegie Museums of Pittsburgh and the University of Pittsburgh. In 1923 Holland offered Avinoff a curatorial position in the entomology department of the Carnegie Institute's Museum of Natural History. He did not accept at first but occasionally worked for the department while continuing his successful career as a commercial artist.

Within two years, however, in 1926, Avinoff became the director of the museum where he remained until his retirement in 1945. His accomplishments included acquisitions, such as the museum's Tyrannosaurus rex, and significant contributions in the fields of botany, entomology, and biology. He guided the museum through the Great Depression and World War II while helping to develop museology as a field.

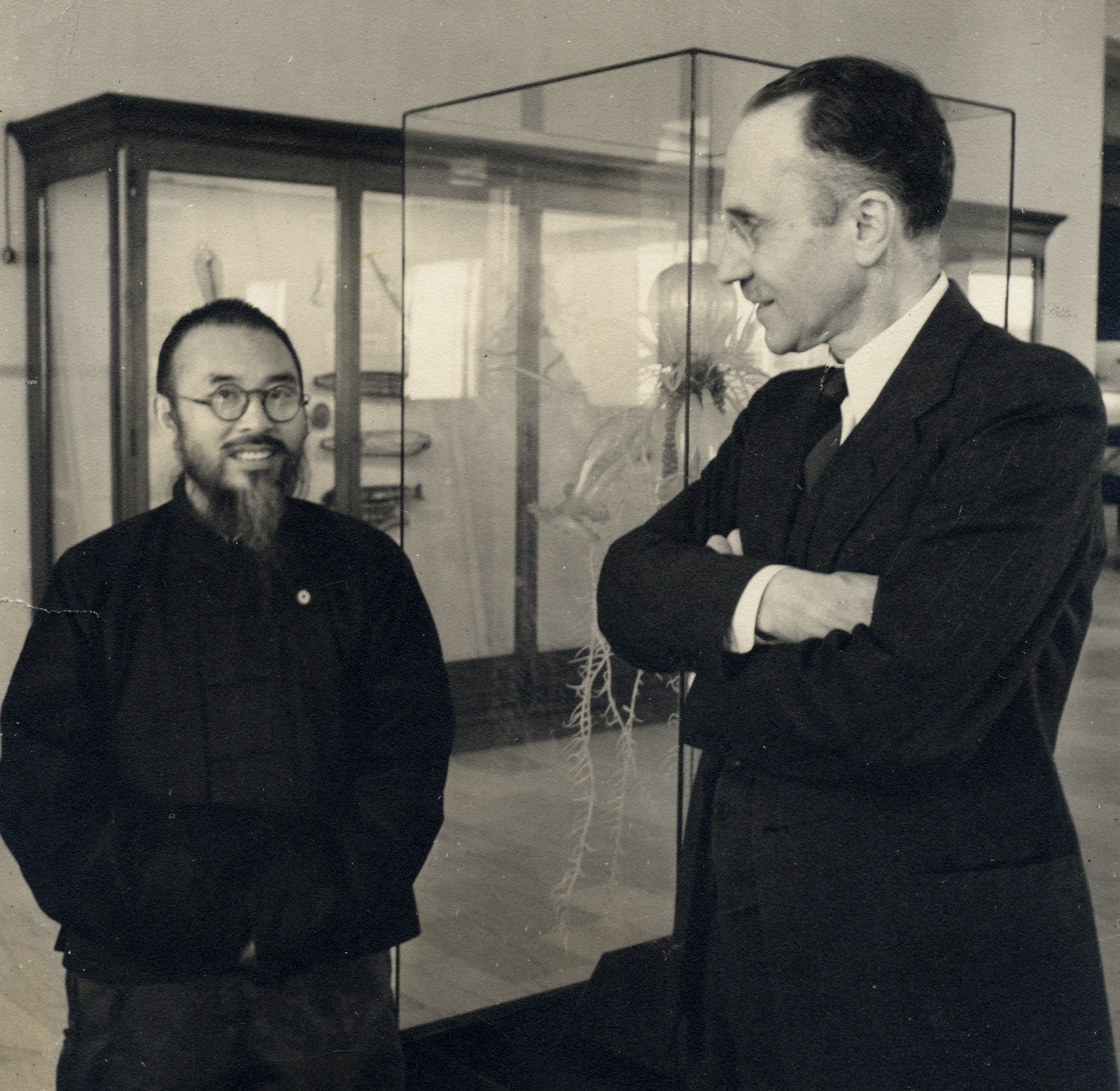
Avinoff at Carnegie Museum of Natural History with an international colleague

He was awarded an honorary Doctor of Science degree from the University of Pittsburgh in 1927. Avinoff's research associates at the Carnegie Institute Museum of Natural History included Childs Frick and the lepidopterist Cyril F. dos Passos, and Vladimir Nabokov, whose father he had known in Russia. Avinoff became an American citizen in 1928.

== Lepidopterist ==
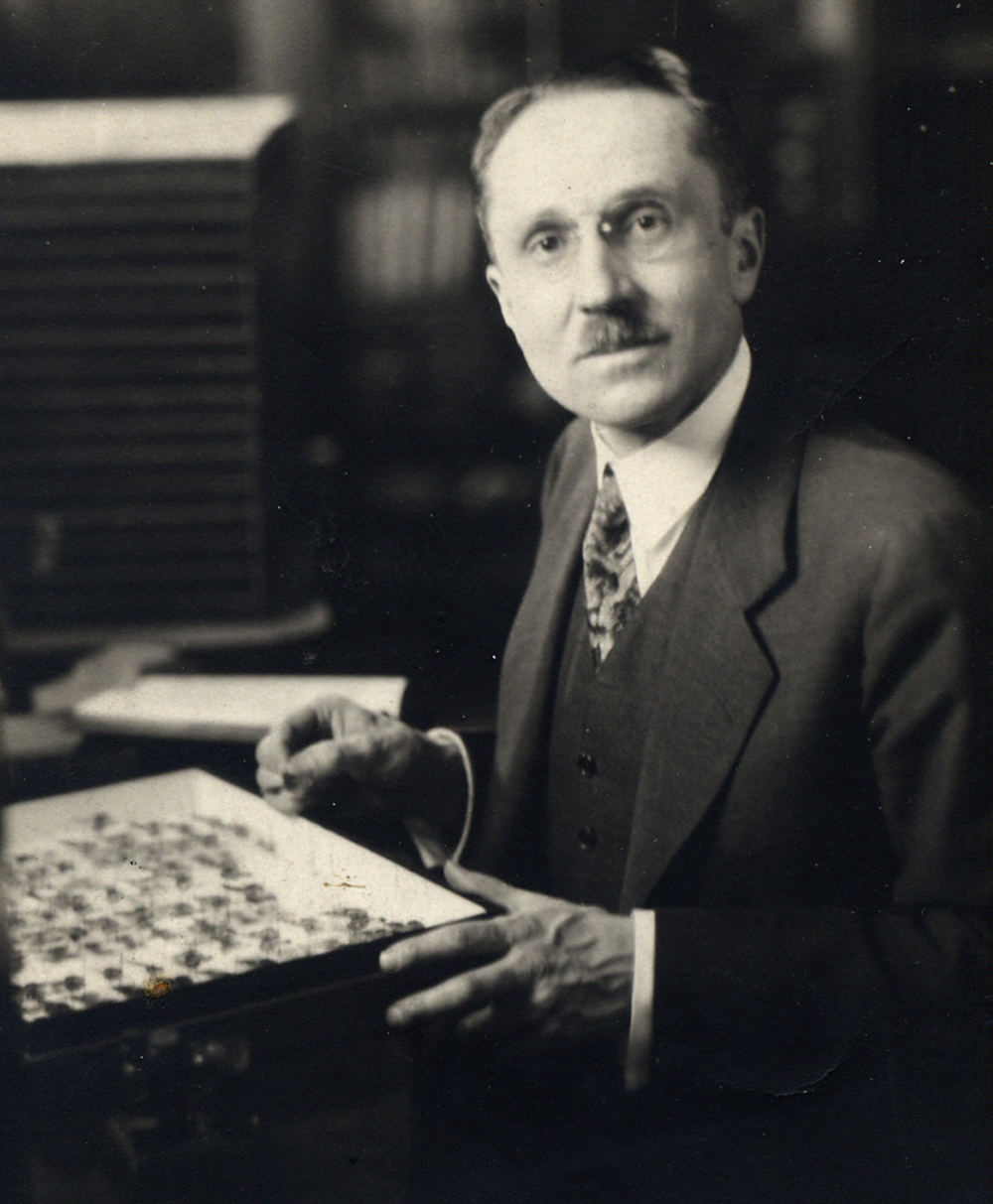
Andrey Avinoff at the Carnegie Museum in Pittsburgh with one of his butterfly collections.

In Russia, Avinoff sponsored more than 40 butterfly collecting expeditions in Central Asia. He personally traveled on arduous expeditions in 1908 to Russian Turkestan and the Pamir, in 1912 through India and Kashmir over the Karakoram Pass to Ladakh and "Chinese Turkestan" (the Tarim Basin), before these regions were open to explorers. Prior to the political upheavals of 1917, he was awarded the Imperial Russian Geographical Society's prestigious gold medal. When he left Russia for the last time in September 1917, Avinoff had to abandon his voluminous personal collection of over 80,000 specimens, the largest collection of Asiatic butterflies in the world, including his beloved Parnassus species. He named five variations of this rare high altitude butterfly including: Parnassius Autocrator, Parnassius Hannyngtoni, Parnassius Jacobson, Parnassius Kiritshenkoi, Parnassius Maharaja.

The Avinoff butterfly collection was nationalized by the Bolsheviks and is now housed in the Zoological Science Museum in St. Petersburg., which became government property. In the 1930s Soviet authorities allowed him to catalog the collection; specimens were shipped to him in Pittsburgh in groups and then returned by him. Following World War II, the Mellon family offered to retrieve the collection but were refused by the Soviet government.

In America, by financing of butterfly expeditions, Avinoff managed to build up a near-duplicate collection of Asiatic butterflies which he donated to the Carnegie Museum of Natural History. Between 1936 and 1940, he made six collecting trips to Jamaica, which he discovered a rare high altitude butterfly, later named the Avinoff Hairstreak, and the Shoumatoff Hairstreak, after his nephew."

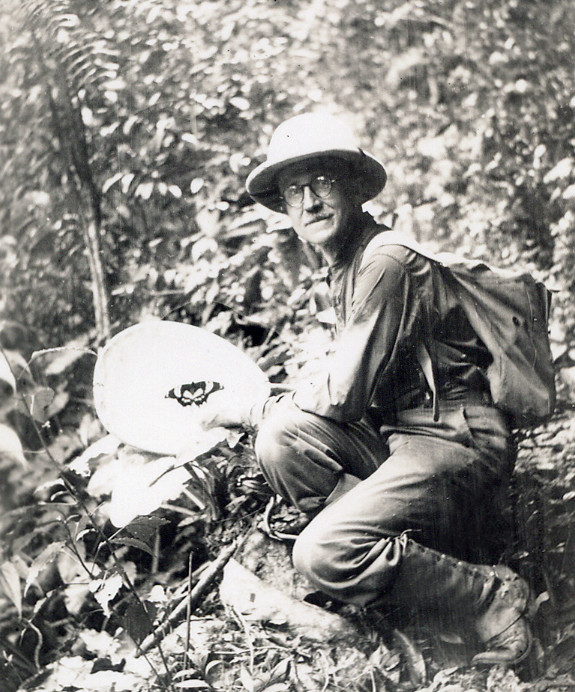
Avinoff in Jamaica while on butterfly expedition with his nephew Nicholas Shoumatoff.

Accompanying him on five of those trips was his nephew Nicholas Shoumatoff (the son of his sister, Elizabeth), for whom Avinoff served as a father figure after the death of Leo Shoumatoff in 1928. The two caught more than fourteen thousand "bots," as butterflies and moths are known in Jamaican patois, doubling the number of known species on the island to more than a thousand. Avinoff's collection may be seen at the Carnegie Museum of Natural History. Avinoff was a prominent member of the Entomological Society of America, of which he became a fellow in 1939.

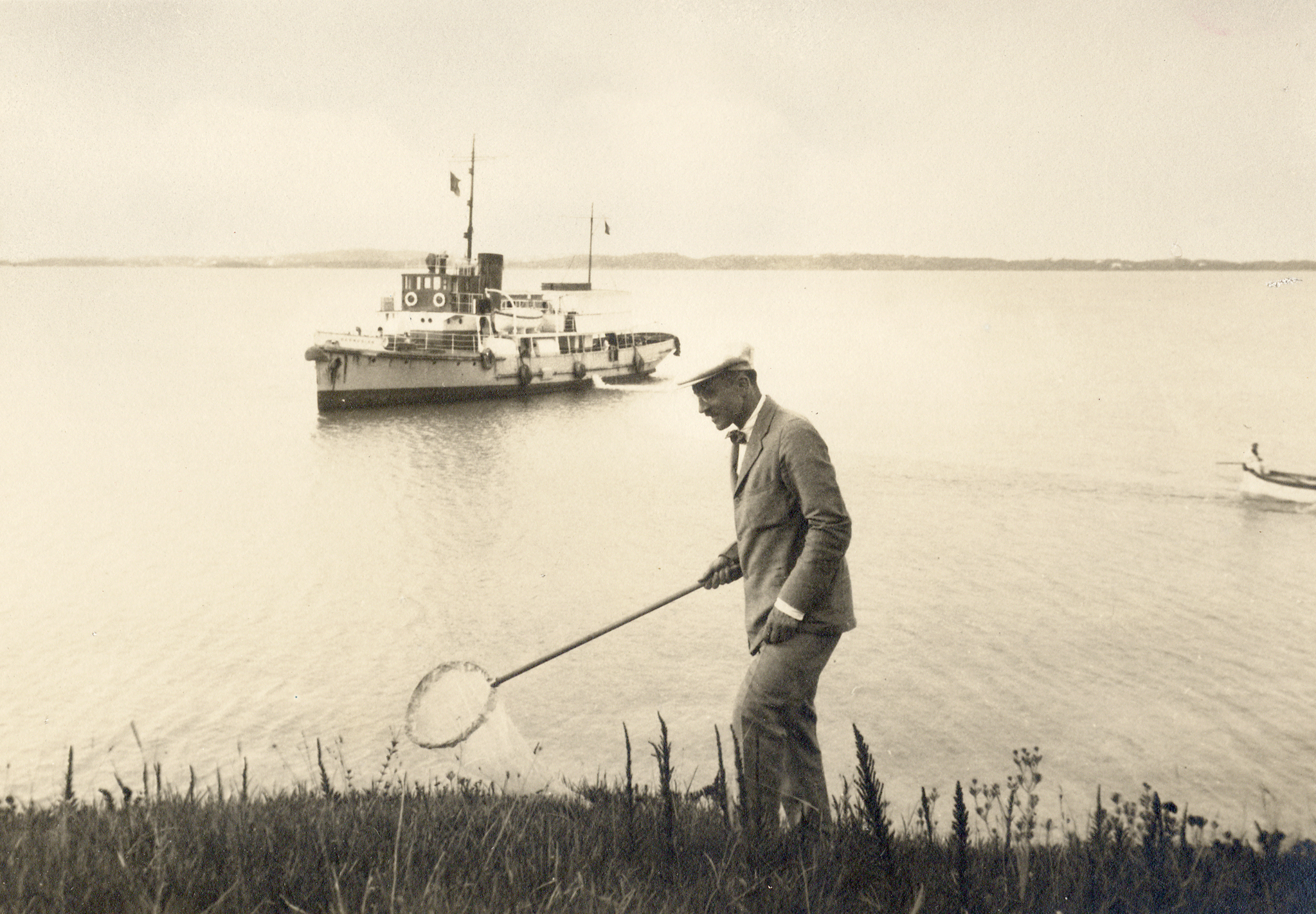
Beachside butterfly hunting, Andrey Avinoff with net in hand.

The Avinoff's early research on the effects of geographical location on butterfly speciation was considered seminal in the field at the time. His groundbreaking work on the biogeography of speciation showed how members of the genus Karanasa evolved into new, separate species in isolated mountain valleys in the Pamir Range. He collaborated with his colleague Walter Sweadner, a curator of entomology at the museum, on The Karanasa Butterflies, A Study in Evolution. This influential monograph was completed by Sweadner and published in 1951, after both Avinoff's and Sweadner's deaths.

== Artist ==
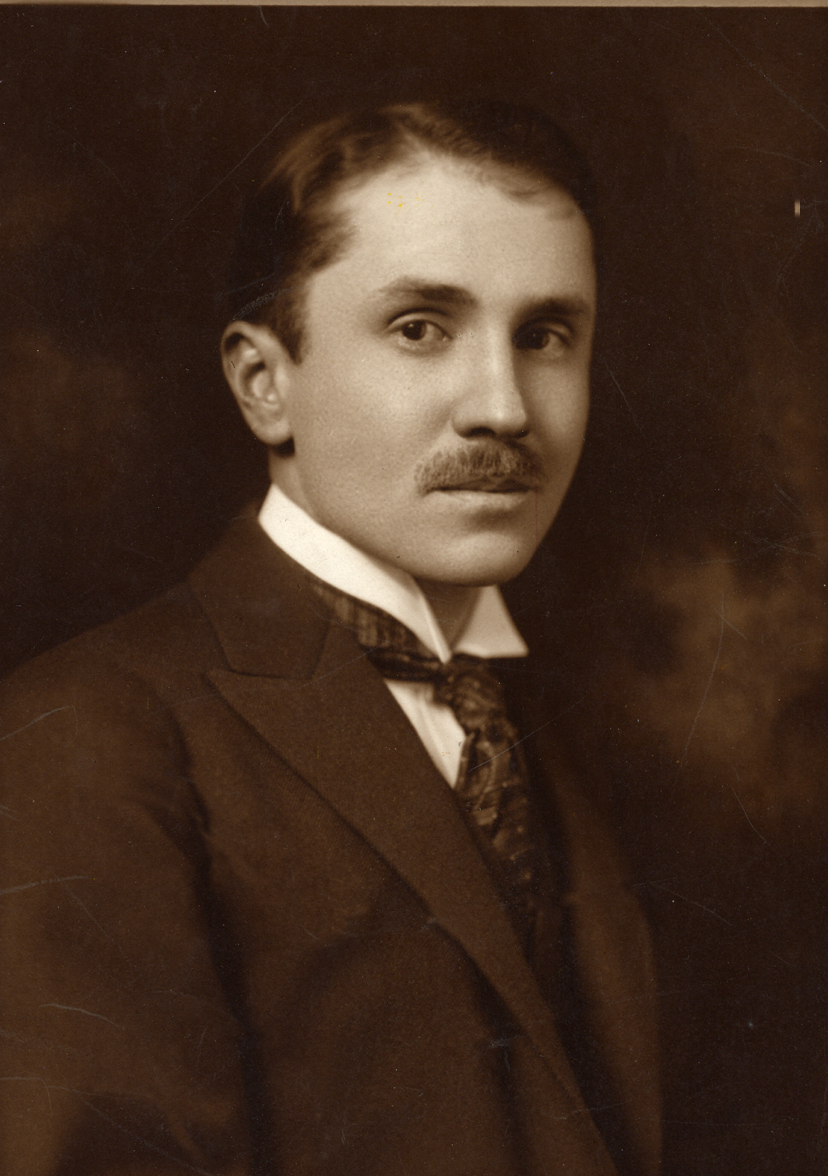
Polymath Andrey Avinoff was prolific in multiple media and demonstrated his ability to paint in many styles including Renaissance, Impressionist, Cubist and others.

Avinoff applied equal versatility to his work as an artist, bringing his expertise as a polymath in both art and zoology to bear on the exhibits, publications, and drawings at the Carnegie Museum of Natural History during his tenure there. After hours, he painted, often through the night. The artist in Avinoff seemed to flow from the scientist, as he believed that art and science are inextricably intertwined. Dr. Walter Read Hovey, head of the University of Pittsburgh's Fine Arts Department, wrote in the introduction to the exhibition catalog for the Carnegie Institute's retrospective of Avinoff's work mounted in 1953, "For him art was a reflection of nature." Hovey also noted, "The genius of Dr. Avinoff [reflects] the whole range of man's experience. ... Like the masters of the Renaissance, he was skilled in many ways, a distinguished scientist, artist, museum specialist, mystic, and popular friend of many."

Avinoff's artistic output was prodigious. Pastels, florals, landscapes, etchings, folios, scientific drawings, and illustrations all seemed to appear effortlessly. Although he worked in numerous media, he was a master of watercolor. His art works are remarkable for their precision, exquisite execution, and unparalleled elegance, qualities abundantly demonstrated in the 450 botanical illustrations he painted from live specimens for O. E. Jennings's Wild Flowers of Western Pennsylvania and the Upper Ohio Basin, published in two volumes by the University of Pittsburgh Press in 1953. Most of Avinoff's illustrations for this monumental work were created between 1941 and 1943.

His other works from nature range from arrangements of tulips and roses to bouquets in the Dutch manner. His orchid paintings from live specimens at Planting Fields in Long Island, New York, became a folio. Avinoff sold his Dutch Manner paintings to prominent families to raise funds to re-collect his Asiatic butterfly collection. Of these paintings he said, "I have turned my flowers into butterflies!"

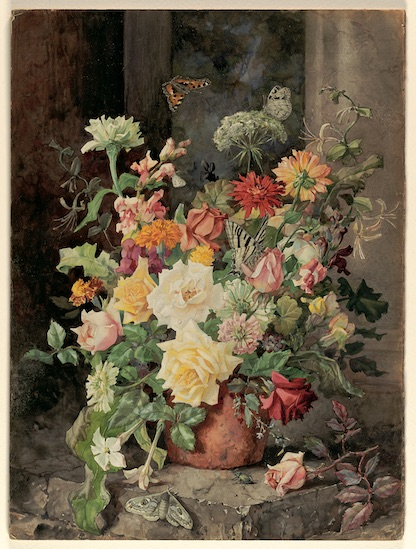
Avinoff painting in the Dutch Manner

His expertise on Persian decorative art was expressed in paintings reminiscent of Persian miniatures. Butterflies were a common motif in his paintings, representative of his appreciation for the beauty of nature, and the fleeting nature of human existence.

Also known for his visual exploration of metaphysical realms, Avinoff created fantastical works with mystical qualities and symbolism. Angels, terrifying demons and ominous apocalyptic imagery were frequently depicted in his work. His series of illustrations for Lermontov's poem, "The Demon," tell of a fallen angel's passionate and doomed love of the beautiful Tamara.

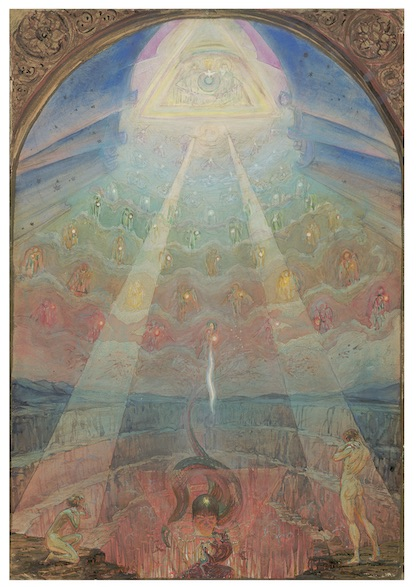
"Eye of Wisdom" watercolor exhibited at the Ainslie Gallery in a show called "Paintings by A. Avinoff", NYC, 1921.

One of Avinoff's most famous series of illustrations, was created (c. 1935–1938) for The Fall of Atlantis (1938), a long poem in Russian published in the United States by George V. Golokhvastoff. In 1944 Avinoff published these illustrations, originally rendered in charcoal, chalk, brush, pen, spattering, and scraping on paper, in a limited folio edition of photogravures. Best known is the last, no. 17, The Death of the High Priest. Out of the catastrophic destruction of Atlantis, with the backdrop of fuming smoke and burning ziggurat, the withered hand of the high priest emerges from the swirling tidal waves. It is reaching upward, toward a constellation of stars forming an ankh, symbolic of rebirth out of the cataclysmic devastation of an arrogant culture.

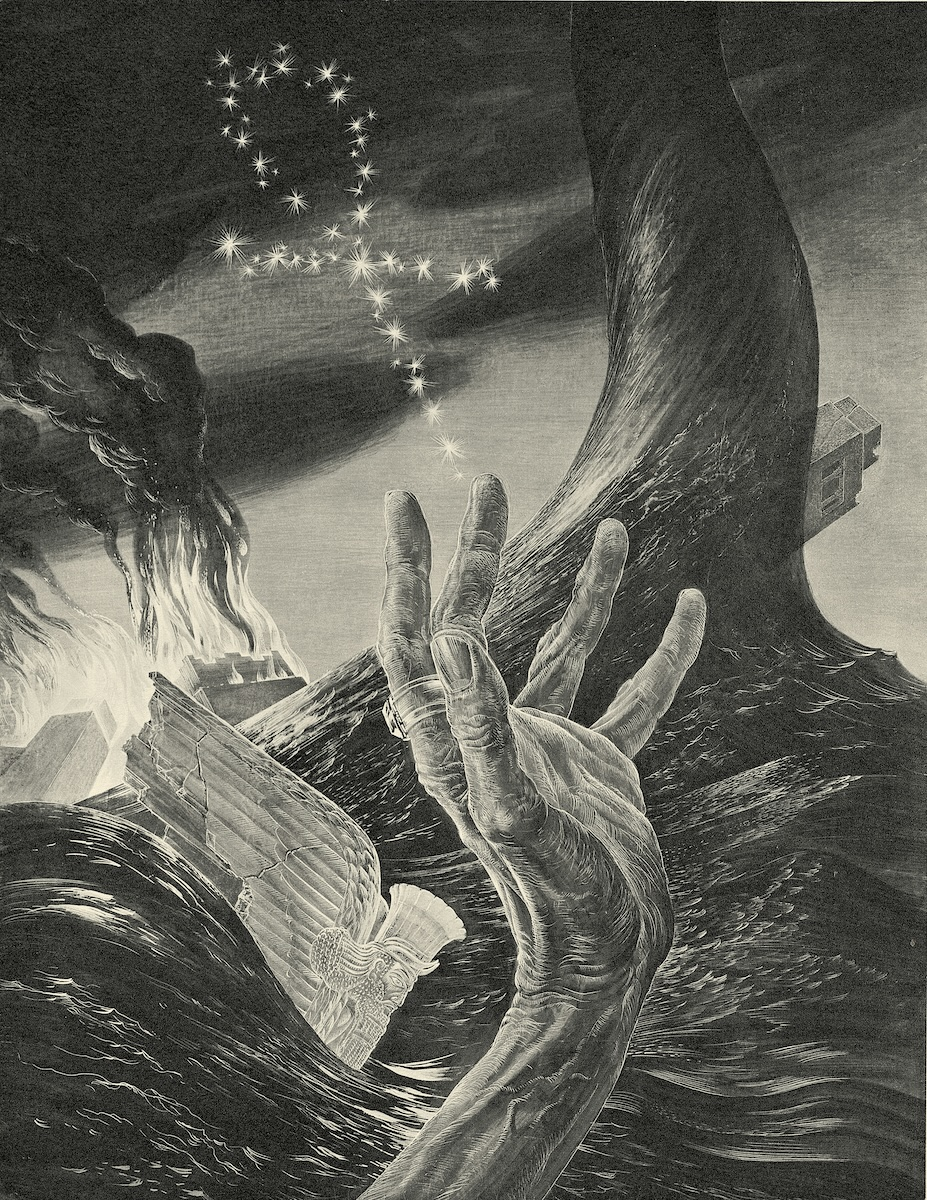
Iconic "Death of the High Priest" from Avinoff's self-published depictions of the Fall of Atlantis.

In unpublished portions of an essay about her great-uncle written for the exhibition catalog Andrey Avinoff: In Pursuit of Beauty (2011), Antonia Shoumatoff remarks that Avinoff "intuited that the symbolism of Atlantis and the apocalypse were metaphorically relevant to modern civilization as symbolic of destruction and rebirth. ... [He] chooses to illustrate the themes of birth and death with vivid images of angels, demons and ghosts trying to pierce through the veils of life and death, often actually including a swathe of clouds, separating the seen and the unseen worlds."

Avinoff's work was exhibited in the 1940s and 1950s, notably in Flower Paintings by A. Avinoff, a 1947 exhibition at the Knoedler Gallery in New York City, and An Exhibition of Andrey Avinoff: The Man of Science, Religion, Mysticism, Nature, Society and Fantasy, a 1953 retrospective at the Carnegie Institute. After he retired in 1945, he entered his most prolific period of painting, producing work for five one-man shows, a folio of 120 orchid botanicals, and innumerable other paintings.

== Professor and bibliophile ==
In an age of specialization, Avinoff brought an interdisciplinary approach to a broad range of fields, demonstrating the connections between culture, nature, science and art. In every area of his expertise, Avinoff invoked an expansive and inspiring approach, which drew standing-room-only audiences to the talks that he gave in the lecture halls of the University of Pittsburgh. He was a sought-after speaker, and his talks were broadcast over the radio in Pittsburgh. Lecturing as an adjunct professor in the departments of fine arts and biology, Avinoff was renowned as an expert on decorative arts, Persian art, plant and animal motifs, and Russian iconography. His book collection, the largest compendium of Russian decorative arts volumes outside of Russia, is now housed at the Hillwood Museum in Washington, DC. The collection was purchased in the 1930s from the New York book dealers Simeon Bolan and Israel Perlstein. It provided the basis for The Icon and the Axe (1966), a comprehensive study of Russian culture by James H. Billington, then Librarian of Congress.

== Legacy and cultural impact ==
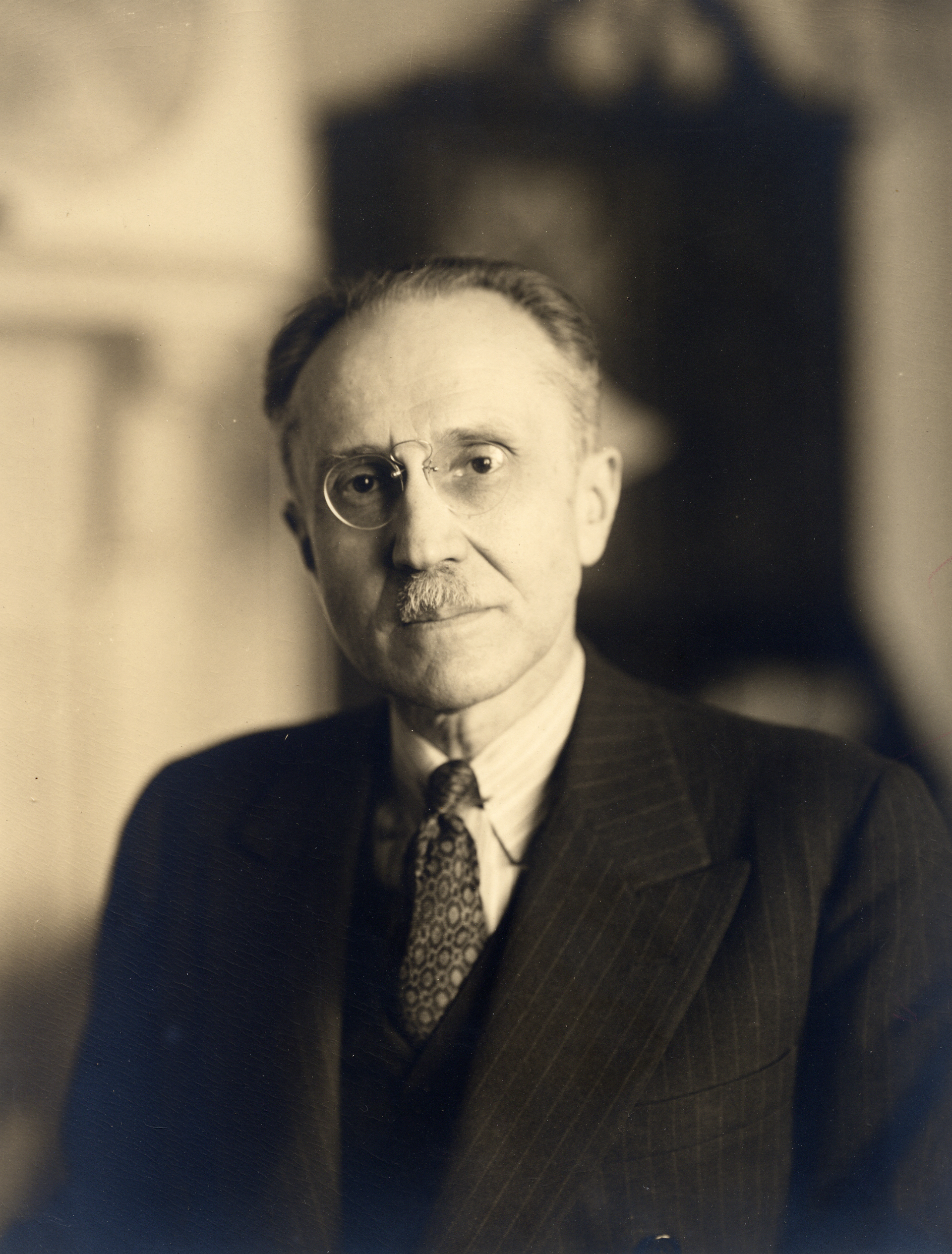
Director of the Carnegie Museum of Natural History, Avinoff sports prince-nez glasses in this candid photo.

Avinoff was profiled by Geoffrey T. Hellman in The New Yorker in 1948, and he had been photographed for the cover story of a Life magazine issue slated to appear in fall 1949 when he died in July of that year. Igor Sikorsky delivered his eulogy.

Life magazine cover for never published article on Avinoff.

Since Avinoff's death, his art has been rediscovered, and his status as one of the most important émigré Russian artists of the 20th century has been firmly established. The exhibition , (2005), at the Kinsey Institute at the Indiana University in Bloomington, placed Avinoff as an important émigré painter in relation to other Russian artists, some also homosexual. He has continued to receive growing recognition as a homosexual artist and advocate, "an aspect of his life that he never publicized" during his lifetime.

Andrey Avinoff: In Pursuit of Beauty, a 2011 retrospective exhibition of Avinoff's work at the Carnegie Museum of Art, garnered international attention for his work. Curator Louise Lippincott summarized Avinoff's legacy as part of the Mir Iskusstva (Russian Silver Age of Art) in the exhibition catalog: "Avinoff should rightfully be considered one of the most important survivors of the Russian Silver Age of Art to reach the United States... Not only did he embody Silver Age ideals and practices [in] his life and work, he instilled them in the next generation of New York-based artists and intellectuals who would turn that city into the next great center of international modernist culture."

In April–May 1982 Avinoff and his family were profiled in The New Yorker magazine in a two-part series written by his grandnephew Alex Shoumatoff (excerpted from his 1982 book Russian Blood). Avinoff's archive is housed at the University of Pittsburgh's Hillman Library's Archives & Special Collections and is available for serious researchers and authors. In 1964 the university recognized Avinoff's enduring scientific contributions with the establishment of the Andrey Avinoff Professorship of Biology (the Avinoff Chair).

== Exhibitions ==
- The Moscow Artist's Society, Moscow, 1903. (Group exhibition)
- The Imperial Academy of Art, St. Petersburg, 1910. (Group exhibition)
- Paintings by A. Avinoff. Ainslie Gallery, New York, 1921.
- Flowers by Andrey Avinoff. Cranbrook Institute of Science, Bloomfield Hills, MI, 1945.
- Flower Paintings by A. Avinoff. M. Knoedler & Company, Inc., New York, June 2–June 20, 1947.
- Flower Paintings by Andrey Avinoff. Carnegie Institute, Department of Fine Arts, Pittsburgh, 1948.
- National Academy of Design, New York, 1948.
- New York Botanical Garden, 1949.
- Andrey Avinoff Watercolors. Flowers and Butterflies. National Audubon Society, New York, October 7–November 26, 1953.
- An Exhibition of Andrey Avinoff: The Man of Science, Religion, Mysticism, Nature, Society and Fantasy. Carnegie Institute, Department of Fine Arts, Pittsburgh, *December 4, 1953 – January 3, 1954. [Catalog by Virginia E. Lewis; introduction by Walter Read Hovey.]
- Watercolors of Orchids by Andrey Avinoff. Henry Clay Frick Fine Arts Gallery, Cathedral of Learning, University of Pittsburgh, January 10–February 6, 1961.
- Andrey Avinoff—Botanical Paintings. Hunt Botanical Library, Carnegie Institute of Technology, Pittsburgh, 2 May–15 October 1965. [Catalogue by George H. M. Lawrence.]
- Wonderful Wildflowers: Botanical Watercolors by Andrey Avinoff. Carnegie Museum of Natural History, Pittsburgh, April 28–December 1986.
- Out of Russia; The Art of Chagall, Tchelitchew, and Avinoff. Kinsey Institute, Indiana University, Bloomington, 2005. (Group exhibition)
- Visions through the Apocalypse. The Heritage Gallery of the Edgar Cayce A.R.E. [Association for Research and Enlightenment], Virginia Beach, VA, November 2005. [Antonia Shoumatoff, curator.]
- Andrey Avinoff: In Pursuit of Beauty. Carnegie Museum of Art, Pittsburgh, February–June 2011. [Catalog by Louise Lippincott.]
- Watercolor Orchids at Planting Fields—by Andrey Avinoff (1886–1949). Nassau County Museum of Art, Roslyn Harbor, NY, April 12–May 11, 2014.
- Andrey Avinoff: Fantastic Visions. University Art Gallery at the University of Pittsburgh, October 21-December 9, 2022.

== Selected publications ==
- "Some New Forms of Parnassius (Lepidoptera Rhodaloptera)." Transactions of the Entomological Society of London 63 (1916): 351–360.
- "Descriptions of Some New Species and Varieties of Rhopalocera in the Carnegie Museum." Annals of the Carnegie Museum 16 (1926): 355–374.
- "The Natural History Museum: A Treasury from Many Lands; An Address Given over the University of Pittsburgh Radio." Carnegie 2, no. 1 (April 1928).
- "Museums and the People." American Magazine of Art 19 (1928): 596–601.
- "A Trip to Western Tibet." Pittsburgh Record 5 (April 1931): 38, 42, 46.
- "Animals That Were Not." Carnegie 6, no. 1 (April 1932): 3–7.
- Avinoff, Andrey, William J. Holland, and Carl Heinrich. "The Lepidoptera Collected by G. M. Sutton on Southampton Island: Rhopalocera, Heterocera." Memoirs of the *Carnegie Museum 12, part 2, section 5 (December 1935): 3–30.
- Avinoff, Andrey, and Nicholas Shoumatoff. "Jamaican Summer." Carnegie 14 (November 1940): 175–182.
- "Russian Icons: An Exhibition of the Hann Collection in the Fine Arts Galleries." Carnegie 17, no. 8 (January 1944): 227–235.
- Hann, George R. (1944). Russian Icons and Objects of Ecclesiastical and Decorative Art from the Collection of George R. Hann. Carnegie Institute. [Introduction and descriptive data by Andrey Avinoff.] https://catalog.hathitrust.org/Record/000406128
- Avinoff, Andrey, and Nicholas Shoumatoff. "An Annotated List of the Butterflies of Jamaica." Annals of the Carnegie Museum 30 (1946): 263–295. *https://www.biodiversitylibrary.org/page/52337183.
- "An Analysis of Color and Pattern in Butterflies of the Asiatic Genus Karanasa." Annals of the Carnegie Museum 31 (1950): 321–330. *https://www.biodiversitylibrary.org/page/52454239.
- Avinoff, Andrey, and Walter R. Sweadner. "The Karanasa Butterflies, A Study in Evolution." Annals of the Carnegie Museum 32 (1951): 1–250. *https://www.biodiversitylibrary.org/page/52422257.

== Illustrations ==
- Masson, Thomas L. "Ten Houses of Ten Authors." Country Life (April 1924): 34–41.
- Noel, Sybille (1931). The Magic Bird of Chomo-Lung-Ma, Tales of Mount Everest, the Turquoise Peak. Doubleday, Doran.
- Golokhvastoff, George V. (1938). Gibel Atlantide: Poema. Obshestva revniteleie russkoi iziashnoi slovesnosti. [Avinoff's original series of 17 illustrations, ca. 1935–1938.]
- Avinoff, Andrey (1944). The Fall of Atlantis, A Series of Graphic Impressions of the Poem. Eddy Press Corporation. [Folio edition of photogravures of the c. 1935–1938 illustrations, with his own commentary.]
- Osborn, Fairfield (1944). The Pacific World: Its Vast Distances, Its Lands and the Life upon Them, and Its Peoples. W. W. Norton.
- Bowman, John G., Ruth Crawford Mitchell, and Andrey Avinoff (1947). Nationality Rooms of the University of Pittsburgh. University of Pittsburgh Press.
- Jennings, Otto Emery (1953). Wild Flowers of Western Pennsylvania and the Upper Ohio Basin. 2 vols. University of Pittsburgh Press. [Volume 2, full-page plates of watercolors by Andrey Avinoff.]

== Bibliography ==
- Altdorfer, John. "Chasing Beauty." Carnegie (Spring 2011). https://carnegiemuseums.org/magazine-archive/2011/spring/feature-245.html.
- Billington, James H. (1966). The Icon and the Axe: An Interpretive History of Russian Culture. Knopf.
- Bowlt, John E. (2008). Moscow & St. Petersburg 1900–1920: Art, Life & Culture of the Russian Silver Age. Vendome Press.
- Bowlt, John E. (1982). The Silver Age: Russian Art of the Early Twentieth Century and the "World of Art" Group. Oriental Research Partners.
- Chavchavadze, Paul (1968). Marie Avinov: Pilgrimage through Hell; An Autobiography. Prentice-Hall.
- Collins, Michael M. "Walter Sweadner and the Wild Silk Moths of the Bitterroot Mountains." Carnegie 63, no. 7 (1997).
- Dickinson, Sally H. (2018)."The Missing Links to the Igor Sikorsky Story: His Struggle to Survive the Years between 1924 and 1929." PrintWorks, Leominster, MA
- Emmel, Thomas Chadbourne (1975). Butterflies: Their World, Their Life Cycle, Their Behavior. Consulting editor Edward S. Ross. Photographs by Edward S. Ross et al. Drawings by Walter Hortens. Knopf..
- Gathorne-Hardy, Jonathan (2000). Sex the Measure of All Things: A Life of Alfred C. Kinsey. Indiana University Press.
- Harris, Harold, Wendy E. Harris, and Dianne Wiebe (2006). Yama Farms: A Most Unusual Catskills Resort. Cragsmoor Historical Society.
- Hellman, Geoffrey T. "Black Tie and Cyanide Jar." The New Yorker (August 21, 1948): 32–47.
- Johnson, Kurt, and Steve Coates (1999). Nabokov's Blues: The Scientific Odyssey of a Literary Genius. Zoland Books.
- Kennedy, Janet (2014). "Closing the Books on Peredviznichestvo: Mir Iskusstva's Long Farewell to Russian Realism."
- Kennedy, Janet (1977). The "Mir Iskusstva" Group and Russian Art, 1898–1912. Garland.
- Kristen, Regina. "Hillwood Museum and Gardens: The Acquisition of the Avinoff-Shoumatoff Collection." Slavic and East European Resources 3, no. 1 (2002)
- Lewis, Virginia E. (n.d. [1953–1954]). An Exhibition of Andrey Avinoff: The Man of Science, Religion, Mysticism, Nature, Society and Fantasy. Introduction by Walter Read Hovey. Carnegie Institute Press. [Exhibition catalog.]
- Lippincott, Louise (2011). Andrey Avinoff: In Pursuit of Beauty. Carnegie Museum of Art. [Exhibition catalog.]
- Lippincott, Louise. "Recollecting Andrey Avinoff." Carnegie (Spring 2009).
- Lockhart, R. H. Bruce (1932). Memoirs of a British Agent. Putnam.
- Samu Margeret Samu (2014) "From Realism to the Silver Age: New Studies in Russian Artistic Culture." Northern Illinois University Press.
- Salmond, Wendy R. (2009). "Russian Icons and American Money, 1928–1938." in Treasures into Tractors: The Selling of Russia's Cultural Heritage, 1918–1938. Ed. by Anne Odom and Wendy R. Salmond. Hillwood Estate, Museum, & Gardens.
- Shoumatoff, Alex (1982). Russian Blood: A Family Chronicle. Coward, McCann & Geoghegan. ISBN 0-698-11139-7. [Excerpts appeared in The New Yorker: "Russian Blood I—Shideyevo" (April 26, 1982), 45ff.; "Russian Blood II—Mopsy, Nika, and Uncle" (May 3, 1982), 52ff.]
- Shoumatoff, Nicholas. "Andrey Avinoff (1884–1949)." Lepidopterists' News 4, no. 1–2 (1950): 7–9.
- Shoumatoff, Nicholas. "Andrey Avinoff Remembered." Carnegie 62, no. 1 (1994): 24–28.
- Shoumatoff, Nicholas, and Nina Shoumatoff, eds. (1996). Around the Roof of the World. University of Michigan Press.
- Sweadner, Walter R. "Three Miles Up: The Avinoff Collection of Butterflies from Central Asia." Carnegie 16, no. 6 (1942): 163–167.
- Thomas, Mary (Feb 23, 2011). "Avinoff Left His Stamp on Museum." Pittsburgh Post Gazette. Retrieved November 5, 2021.

== See also ==
- Avinov, Andrei Nikolaevich at Russian Wikipedia
