= Guillaume-François Debure =

French bookseller and printer (1731 - 1782)

- Born: 1731
- Died: 1782 (aged 50–51)
- Occupation: Printer

Guillaume-François Debure (25 January 1731 in Paris – 15 February 1782 in Paris) was a French printer and bibliographer. The printer Guillaume Debure (1734–1820) was his cousin.

== Works (selection) ==
- 1755: Museum typographicum, seu collectio in qua omnes fere libri rarissimi...recensentur, printed only to 12 copies and published under the name G. F. Rebude, anagram of his surname.
- 1763–1768: Bibliographie instructive, ou Traité de la connaissance des livres rares et singuliers, in-8
- several Catalogs of libraries sought after from the 19th century for the way they are written.
