= John Child Hannyngton =

John Child Hannyngton (23 September 1835, Barrackpore – March 1895, Lewisham) was a judge in the East India Company who served for many years as Resident of Travancore.

Born to Major General John Caulfield Hannyngton (1807–1885) and Harriet, he joined service in the East India Company in 1857 as a writer. In 1859 he went on leave to Bengal for 6 months while posted as Collector and Magistrate at Trichinipoly. He was posted in Malabar in 1861 and made a magistrate in the next year. In 1863 he was a special assistant to the Collector. In 1866 he was an acting judge of small cause court at Tellicherry and in 1867 sub-collector at Bellary as well as acting collector of Malabar. He married Laura Elizabeth née Onslow on 24 March 1866. In 1869 he went to Europe on furlough for two years. In 1871 he returned as judge at Tellichery. He also served at Guntur, Vellore and Salem. He visited Europe again on furlough for two years from 1876 and returned to be Acting Resident at Travancore and Cochin. In 1880 he acted as an arbitrator on boundary disputes between Travancore and Cochin. In 1883 he again went to Europe on furlough for 15 months and in 1884 returned to Travancore and Cochin to serve as Resident.

Hannyngton took an interest in plants sending specimens to Kew while a son Frank Hannyngton took an even keener interest in insects. Hannyngton was the father of the Indian botanist E. K. Janaki Ammal's mother.
