= Guillaume Debure =

French printer (1734–1820)

- Born: 10 May 1734; France
- Died: 14 February 1820 (aged 85)
- Occupation: Book printer. librarian

Guillaume Debure (10 May 1734 – 14 February 1820) was a French printer and librarian.

Debure was the eldest son of the Parisian bookseller Jean Debure and son-in-law (1764) of bookseller Marie-Jacques Barrois, he was a cousin of Guillaume-François Debure.

Received master in his trade May 18, 1759, he was deputy of his community from July 1775. He was imprisoned in the Bastille from 23 to 29 January 1778 for refusing to stamp counterfeit books. He was librarian of the King's Library (1786) (later national and imperial) then of that of Monsieur, brother of the King (1789). He was appointed librarian at the Académie des inscriptions (1788) and member of the French Academy of Sciences (1788). In November 1790, he belonged to the Committee on Monuments (Letters section) and in 1791, he was at the service of the Public Education Committee. From January 1795, he worked as an employee of the temporary committee of the Arts to establish the catalogs of confiscated libraries.

He is a well-known figure among bibliophiles, as well as his two sons, Jean Jacques Debure and Marie Jean Debure, for the excellency of their catalogs among which those of the libraries of duke of La Vallière, Loménie de Brienne, Pierre Paul Louis Randon de Boisset, Louis Marie d'Aumont and Baron d'Holbach.

In operation until 1813, he did not receive a patent bookseller in 1812. From December 1774 to June 1780, he worked in partnership with his younger brother François-Jean-Noël Debure under the reason "Debure Brothers" and from 1803 to 1813, in partnership with his sons who became his successors.
