= John Caulfield Hannyngton =

British military commander

John Caulfield Hannyngton (7 March 1807 – 1885 or 1886) was a British military commander, actuary and mathematician. He is remembered as inventor of a slide rule of previously unattainable precision.

== History ==
Hannyngton was born in Dungannon, County Tyrone, Ireland, a son of Thomas Knox Hannyngton and Mrs Hannyngton, née Caulfield or Caulfeild.

He joined the British Army as a cadet in 1825 and was posted to India with the 24th Regiment of Native Infantry. On the suppression of the Colekan rebellion in 1839 he was given a political appointment, and in 1842 promoted to Judicial Commissioner. He was promoted to Lieutenant-Colonel in 1856 and took command of the 63rd RNI. At the time of the Indian mutiny of 1857 he was with his regiment, which was disarmed but did not rebel. He was transferred to the Military Finance Department on the strength of his competence with figures, and finally promoted to Military Auditor-General which post he held until 1861 when he retired.

He is best remembered today for his invention of a slide rule for astronomical calculations, which had 15 fixed rules, 32 inches (810 mm) long (an effective length of around 12 metres, and hence capable of great precision) and a bank of seven sliding rules. It was manufactured in England by Aston & Mander and a demonstration of its capabilities was made by one Galbraith SFTCD before students of Trinity College Engineering School and reported in Freeman's Journal of 11 June 1884. Examples are today highly collectible.

== Recognition ==
- Hannyngton was elected Fellow of the Royal Astronomical Society on 12 March 1875
- He was elected a Fellow of the Institute of Actuaries

== Family ==
Son John Child Hannyngton (23 September 1835 – March 1895) was born in Barrackpore.

== Publications ==
- John C. Hannyngton; Robert Shortrede (1873). Logarithms of Sines and Tangents for Every Second.
- John C. Hannyngton (1876). Haversines Natural and Logarithmic Used in Computing Lunar Distances for the Nautical Almanac.
- John C. Hannyngton. Table of logarithms and anti-logarithms (four figures), 1-10,000.
- John C. Hannyngton (1884). The slide rule extended.
