= Israel Perlstein =

Polish book dealer (1897–1975)

Israel Perlstein (December 17, 1897 – March 23, 1975) was a book dealer specializing in Russian and Slavic materials.

== Biography ==
Perlstein was born in 1897, in Kovel, Ukraine, though his family moved to Warsaw when he was young. He immigrated to New York in 1920. He began his career in the book trade working with his father, operating a Hebrew language bookstore on East Broadway. In 1926, after hearing about the sale of Russian books from imperial collections, Perlstein traveled to St. Petersburg to purchase volumes. The books were purchased at low prices, with the average cost being $2. In 1930, Perlstein purchased a collection of 1,700 books through Antikvariat from the private library of Nicholas II. Between 1931 and 1932, Herbert Putnam worked with Perlstein to purchase the "Russian Imperial Collection" for the Library of Congress, a collection of 2,800 books from imperial libraries. In September 1933, Perlstein donated an additional 21 books to the Library that had been formerly owned by the children of Nicholas II. In addition to the Library of Congress, Perlstein also supplied Russian books to the New York Public Library, due to the interest of Slavonic Division head Avrahm Yarmolinsky. In 1932, he sold 1,200 volumes to the Harvard University Law Library, including an important 240 volume set of Polnoe sobranie zakonov Rossiiskoi Imperii (Complete Collection of the Laws of the Russian Empire) owned by the Russian royal family. Due to Cold War tensions between the United States and the Soviet Union, it became difficult for Pelstein to buy books directly from Moscow. Instead, he bought books in Warsaw but was later forced to buy books from Prague and Belgrade. These political changes allowed Perlstein by 1960 to become the most prominent dealer of Czech and Slovak publications to American libraries. In 1966, Perlstein was working as a consultant for the Lilly Library at the University of Indiana, helping them build a collection of 100,000 rare Slavic books.
