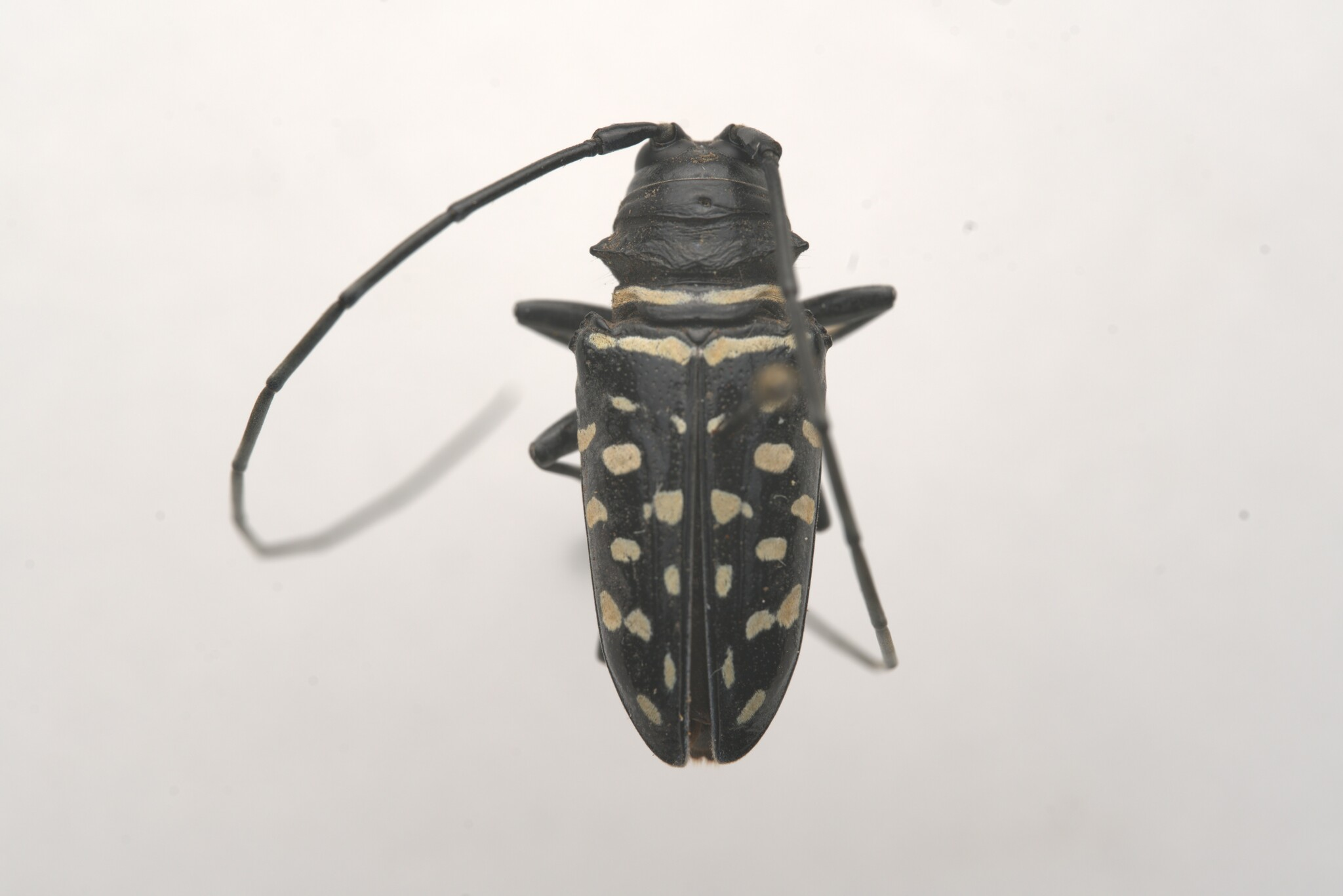
- Sternotomis carbonaria, Uganda

Scientific classification
- Domain: Eukaryota
- Kingdom: Animalia
- Phylum: Arthropoda
- Class: Insecta
- Order: Coleoptera
- Suborder: Polyphaga
- Infraorder: Cucujiformia
- Family: Cerambycidae
- Subfamily: Lamiinae
- Tribe: Sternotomini
- Genus: Sternotomis
- Species: S. carbonaria

Binomial name
- Sternotomis carbonaria Aurivillius, 1903

Synonyms
- Sternotomis carbonaria perflava Allard, 1993; Sternotomis centralis coerulea Allard, 1993; Sternotomis centralis perviridis Breuning, 1953; Sternotomis centralis semirufa Allard, 1993

= Sternotomis carbonaria =

Species of beetle

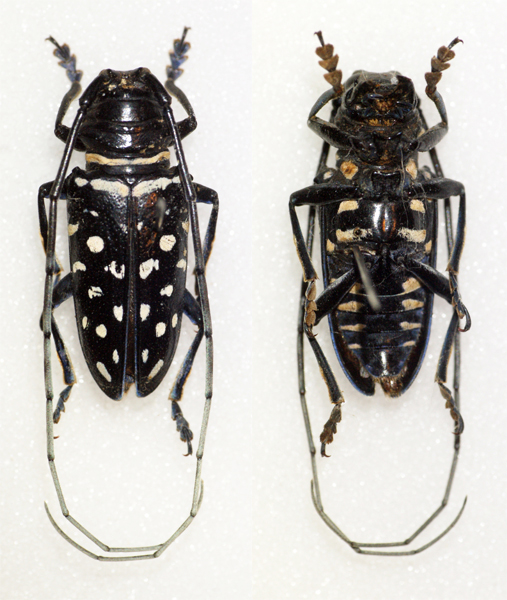
Sternotomis carbonaria (male)

Sternotomis carbonaria is a species of beetle in the family Cerambycidae. It was described by Per Olof Christopher Aurivillius in 1904. It is known from Tanzania, the Democratic Republic of the Congo, and Uganda.
