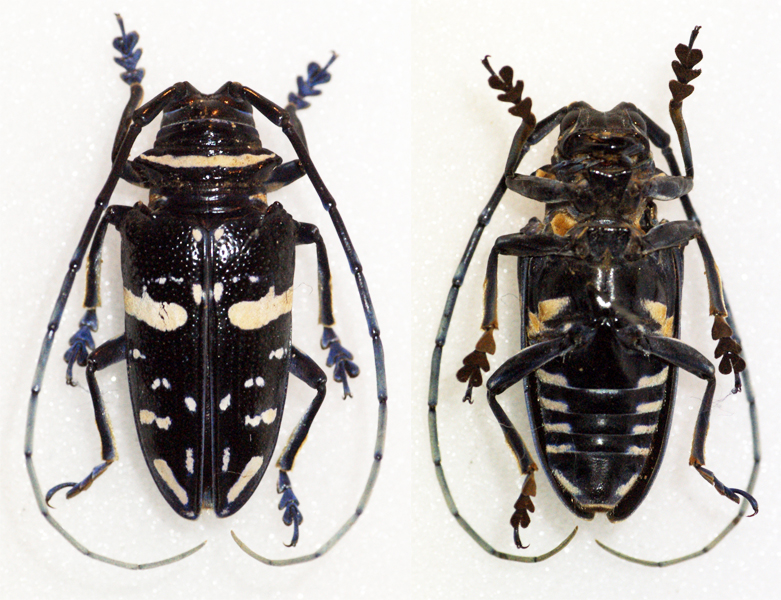

Scientific classification
- Domain: Eukaryota
- Kingdom: Animalia
- Phylum: Arthropoda
- Class: Insecta
- Order: Coleoptera
- Suborder: Polyphaga
- Infraorder: Cucujiformia
- Family: Cerambycidae
- Subfamily: Lamiinae
- Tribe: Sternotomini
- Genus: Sternotomis
- Species: S. caillaudi

Binomial name
- Sternotomis caillaudi Chevrolat, 1844

Synonyms
- Cerambyx ornatus Latreille, 1827 (Preocc.); Sternotomis Caillaudi Chevrolat, 1844; Sternotomis Caillaudi v. inconstans Gilmour, 1956; Sternotomis Caillaudi v. reductomaculata Gilmour, 1956

= Sternotomis caillaudi =

Species of beetle

Sternotomis caillaudi is a species of beetle in the family Cerambycidae, found in Sub-Saharan Africa. It was described by Louis Alexandre Auguste Chevrolat in 1844.
