= Sternotomis runsoriensis =

Scientific classification
- Domain: Eukaryota
- Kingdom: Animalia
- Phylum: Arthropoda
- Class: Insecta
- Order: Coleoptera
- Suborder: Polyphaga
- Infraorder: Cucujiformia
- Family: Cerambycidae
- Subfamily: Lamiinae
- Tribe: Sternotomini
- Genus: Sternotomis
- Species: S. runsoriensis

Binomial name
- Sternotomis runsoriensis Gahan, 1909

Synonyms
- Sternotomis runsoriensis coeruleata Allard, 1993; Sternotomis runsoriensis dohertyi Allard, 1993; Sternotomis runsoriensis ochracea Allard, 1993; Sternotomis runsoriensis reductevitticollis Allard, 1993

Species of beetle

Sternotomis runsoriensis is a species of beetle in the family Cerambycidae. It was described by Charles Joseph Gahan in 1909. It is known from Uganda and Tanzania.
