= Sternotomis mimica =

Scientific classification
- Kingdom: Animalia
- Phylum: Arthropoda
- Class: Insecta
- Order: Coleoptera
- Suborder: Polyphaga
- Infraorder: Cucujiformia
- Family: Cerambycidae
- Subfamily: Lamiinae
- Tribe: Sternotomini
- Genus: Sternotomis
- Species: S. mimica

Binomial name
- Sternotomis mimica Breuning, 1935

Synonyms
- Sternotomis gama Lepesme, 1948; Sternotomis mimica Breuning, 1935; Sternotomis mimica viridissima Allard, 1993

Species of beetle

Sternotomis mimica is a species of beetle in the family Cerambycidae, found in Sub-Saharan Africa. It was described by Stephan von Breuning in 1935.
