= Zographus niveipectus =

Scientific classification
- Domain: Eukaryota
- Kingdom: Animalia
- Phylum: Arthropoda
- Class: Insecta
- Order: Coleoptera
- Suborder: Polyphaga
- Infraorder: Cucujiformia
- Family: Cerambycidae
- Genus: Zographus
- Species: Z. niveipectus

Binomial name
- Zographus niveipectus (Quedenfeldt, 1888)

Synonyms
- Sternotomis (Quimalanca) niveipectus Quedenfeldt, 1888

Species of beetle

Zographus niveipectus is a species of beetle in the family Cerambycidae. It was described by Quedenfeldt in 1888, originally under the genus Sternotomis. It is known from the Central African Republic, Zambia, and the Democratic Republic of the Congo.
