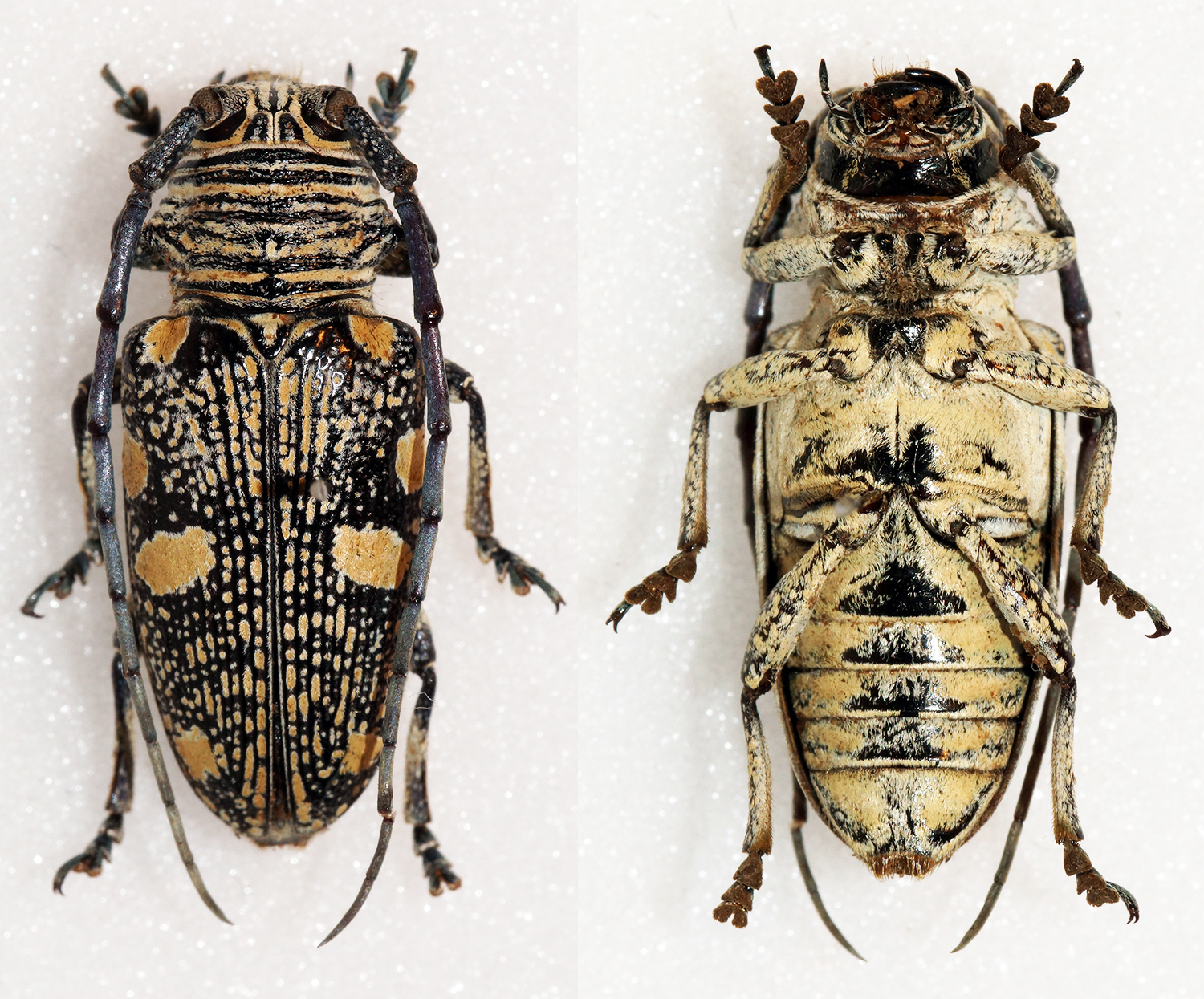

Scientific classification
- Domain: Eukaryota
- Kingdom: Animalia
- Phylum: Arthropoda
- Class: Insecta
- Order: Coleoptera
- Suborder: Polyphaga
- Infraorder: Cucujiformia
- Family: Cerambycidae
- Genus: Zographus
- Species: Z. niveisparsus

Binomial name
- Zographus niveisparsus (Chevrolat, 1844)

Synonyms
- Sternotomis niveisparsa Chevrolat, 1844; Lamia (Sternotomis?) niveisparsa (Chevrolat, 1844)

= Zographus niveisparsus =

Species of beetle

Zographus niveisparsus is a species of beetle in the family Cerambycidae. It was described by Louis Alexandre Auguste Chevrolat in 1844, originally under the genus Sternotomis. It is known from South Africa, Mozambique, and Zimbabwe.
