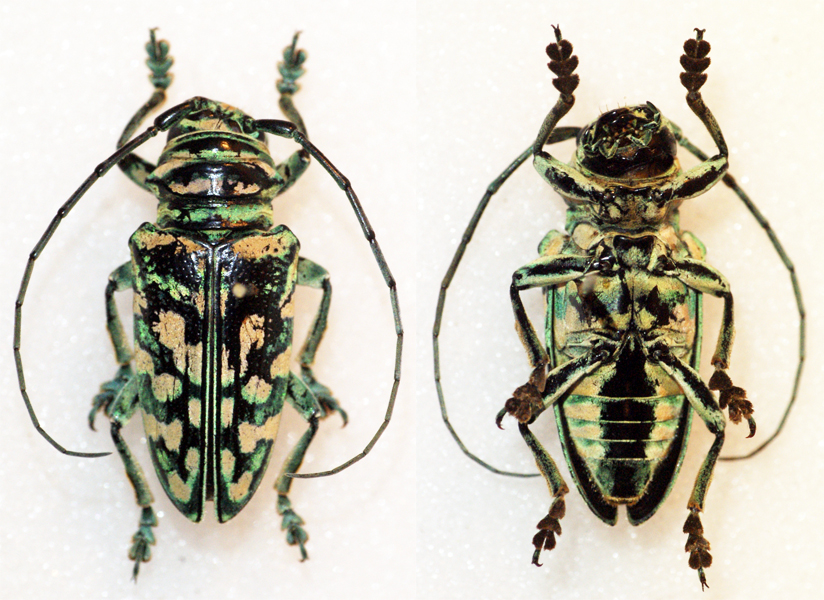
- Sternotomis kuntzeni

Scientific classification
- Domain: Eukaryota
- Kingdom: Animalia
- Phylum: Arthropoda
- Class: Insecta
- Order: Coleoptera
- Suborder: Polyphaga
- Infraorder: Cucujiformia
- Family: Cerambycidae
- Subfamily: Lamiinae
- Tribe: Sternotomini
- Genus: Sternotomis
- Species: S. kuntzeni

Binomial name
- Sternotomis kuntzeni Fiedler, 1939

= Sternotomis kuntzeni =

Species of beetle

Sternotomis kuntzeni is a species of beetle in the family Cerambycidae. It was described by Fiedler in 1939.

== Subspecies ==
- Sternotomis kuntzeni kuntzeni Fiedler, 1939
- Sternotomis kuntzeni kamerunensis Fiedler, 1939
