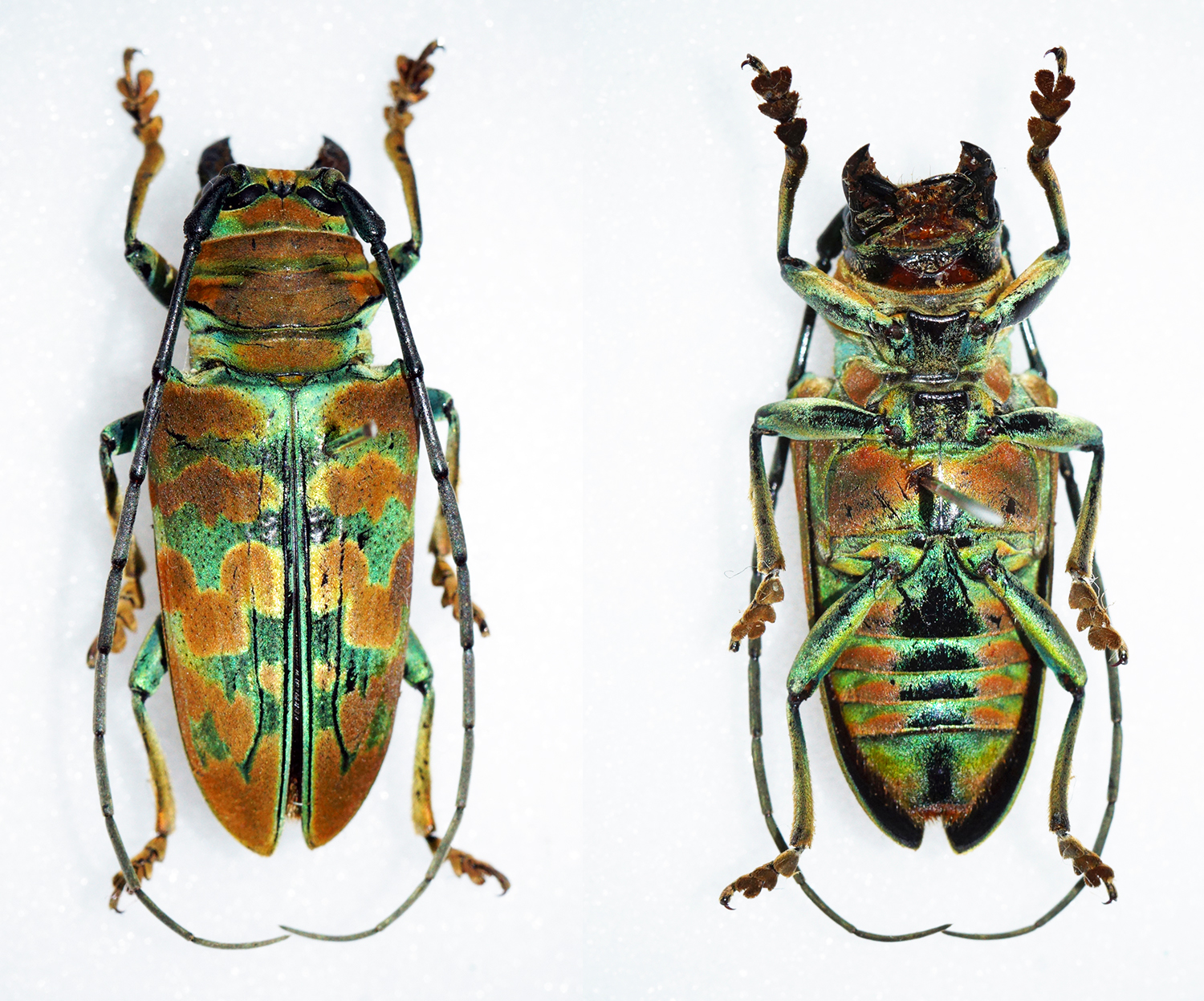

Scientific classification
- Kingdom: Animalia
- Phylum: Arthropoda
- Class: Insecta
- Order: Coleoptera
- Suborder: Polyphaga
- Infraorder: Cucujiformia
- Family: Cerambycidae
- Subfamily: Lamiinae
- Tribe: Sternotomini
- Genus: Sternotomis
- Species: S. lemoulti

Binomial name
- Sternotomis lemoulti Breuning, 1935

Synonyms
- Sternotomis lemoulti Breuning, 1935; Sternotomis marmorata Hintz, 1911

= Sternotomis lemoulti =

Species of beetle

Sternotomis lemoulti is a species of beetle in the family Cerambycidae. It was described by Stephan von Breuning in 1935.
