= Sternotomis rousseti =

Scientific classification
- Domain: Eukaryota
- Kingdom: Animalia
- Phylum: Arthropoda
- Class: Insecta
- Order: Coleoptera
- Suborder: Polyphaga
- Infraorder: Cucujiformia
- Family: Cerambycidae
- Subfamily: Lamiinae
- Tribe: Sternotomini
- Genus: Sternotomis
- Species: S. rousseti

Binomial name
- Sternotomis rousseti Allard, 1993

Species of beetle

Sternotomis rousseti is a species of beetle in the family Cerambycidae, found in Sub-Saharan Africa. It was described by Allard in 1993.
