= Sternotomis centralis =

Scientific classification
- Domain: Eukaryota
- Kingdom: Animalia
- Phylum: Arthropoda
- Class: Insecta
- Order: Coleoptera
- Suborder: Polyphaga
- Infraorder: Cucujiformia
- Family: Cerambycidae
- Subfamily: Lamiinae
- Tribe: Sternotomini
- Genus: Sternotomis
- Species: S. centralis

Binomial name
- Sternotomis centralis Hintz, 1911

Synonyms
- Sternotomis centralis coerulea Allard, 1993; Sternotomis centralis perviridis Breuning, 1953; Sternotomis centralis semirufa Allard, 1993

Species of beetle

Sternotomis centralis is a species of longhorned beetle in the family Cerambycidae. It is known from the Democratic Republic of the Congo and Angola.
