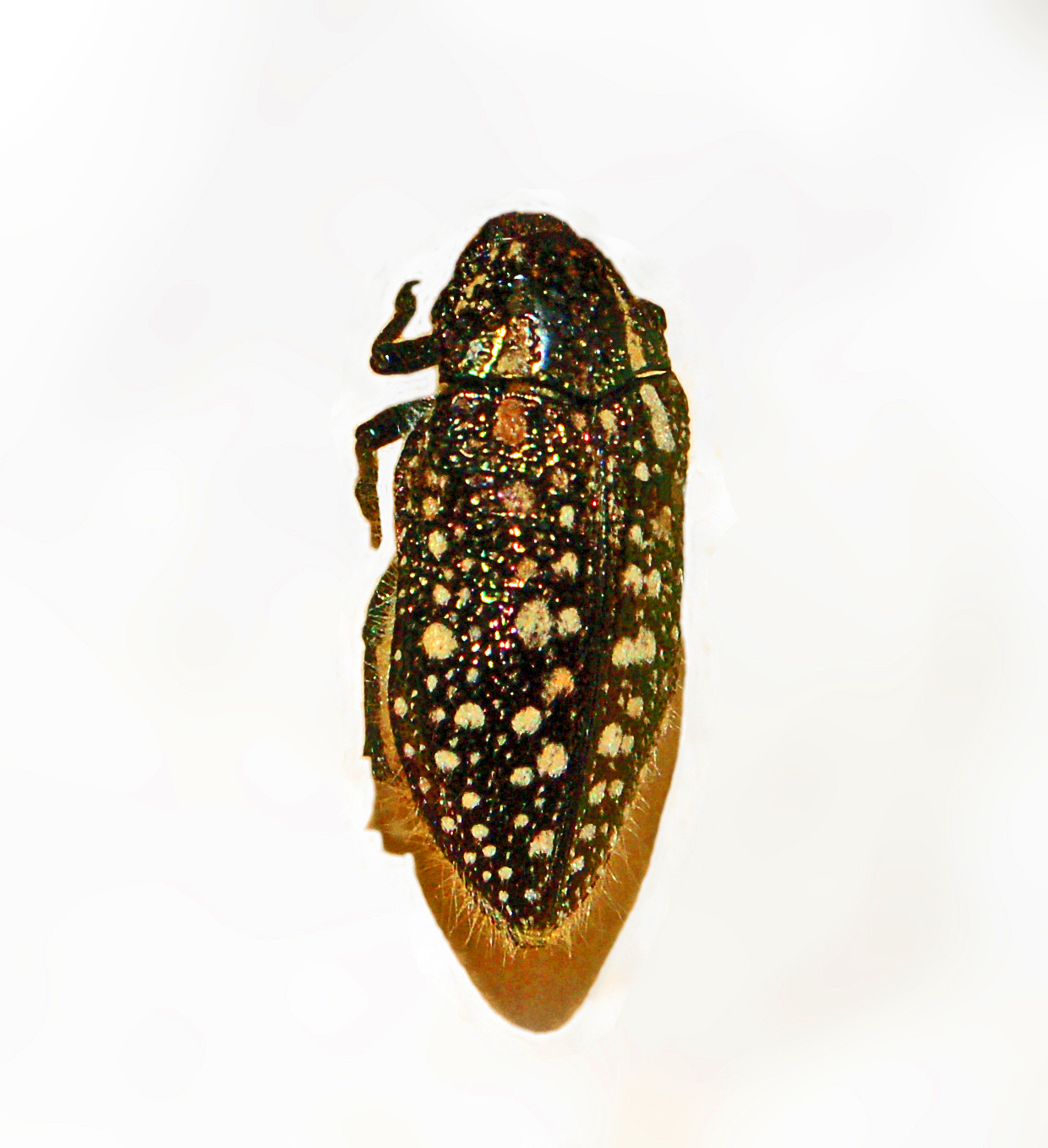
- Julodis stellaris from South Africa

Scientific classification
- Kingdom: Animalia
- Phylum: Arthropoda
- Clade: Pancrustacea
- Class: Insecta
- Order: Coleoptera
- Suborder: Polyphaga
- Infraorder: Elateriformia
- Family: Buprestidae
- Genus: Julodis
- Species: J. stellaris

Binomial name
- Julodis stellaris (Thunberg, 1827)

Synonyms
- Cucujus albomaculatus Voet, 1806 (Unav.); Buprestis stellaris Thunberg, 1827; Julodis maculata Laporte, 1835

= Julodis stellaris =

Species of beetle

Julodis stellaris is a species of beetle belonging to the family Buprestidae. This species occurs in Southern Africa. Many references list the name as Julodis albomaculata, but this name, though published earlier than stellaris, is unavailable under the ICZN, primarily in that Johann Eusebius Voet's work fails to fulfill the requirement in ICZN Article 11.4 that a work must be consistently binomial; none of Voet's names, including albomaculata, are available.
