= Zographus pulverulentus =

Scientific classification
- Kingdom: Animalia
- Phylum: Arthropoda
- Class: Insecta
- Order: Coleoptera
- Suborder: Polyphaga
- Infraorder: Cucujiformia
- Family: Cerambycidae
- Genus: Zographus
- Species: Z. pulverulentus

Binomial name
- Zographus pulverulentus Nonfried, 1906

Synonyms
- Zographus aulicus var. pulverulentus Nonfried, 1906

Species of beetle

Zographus pulverulentus is a species of beetle in the family Cerambycidae. It was described by Nonfried in 1906, originally as a varietas of Zographus aulicus. It is known from the Democratic Republic of the Congo and South Africa.
