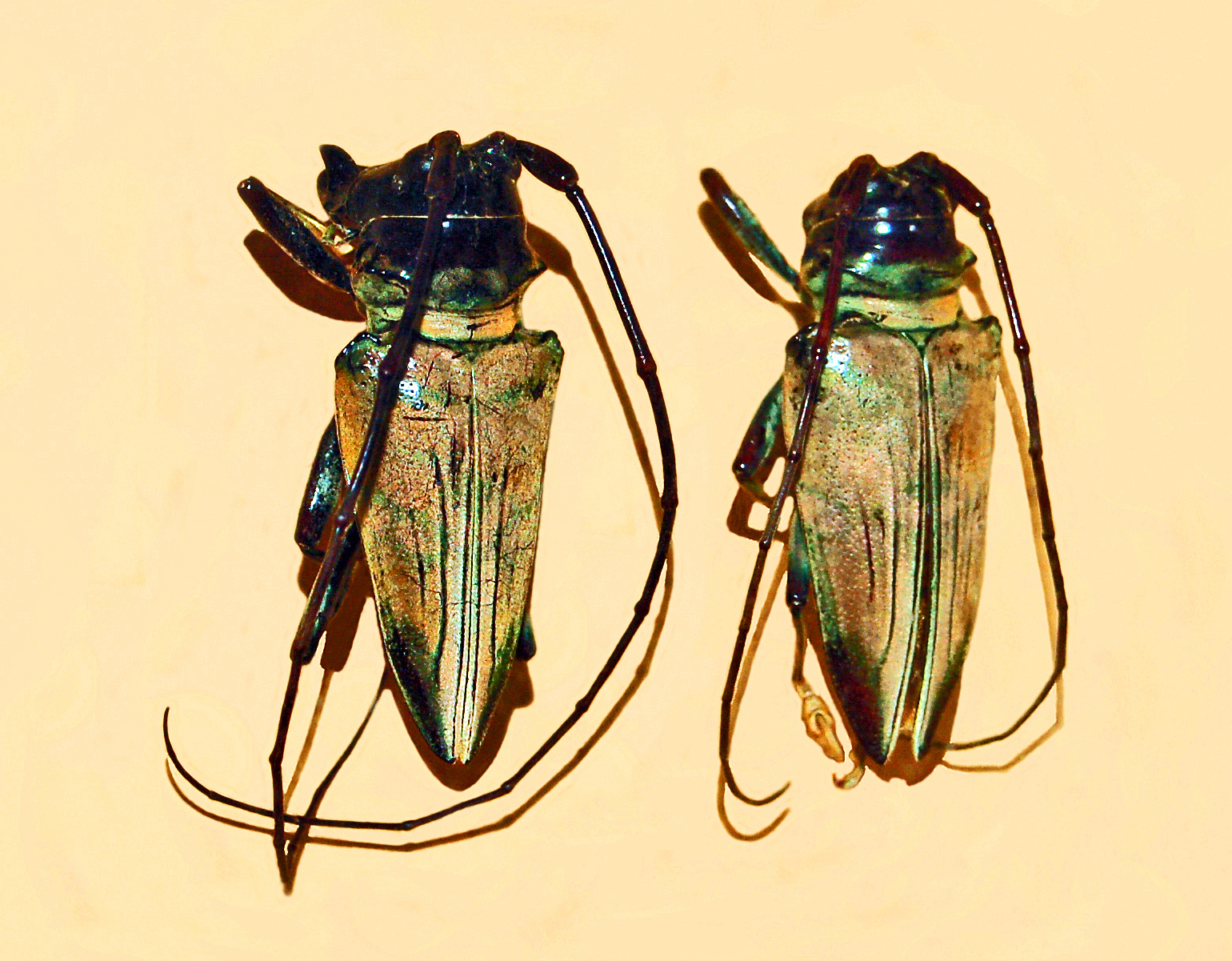
- Sternotomis ducalis from Principe Island. Male and female

Scientific classification
- Domain: Eukaryota
- Kingdom: Animalia
- Phylum: Arthropoda
- Class: Insecta
- Order: Coleoptera
- Suborder: Polyphaga
- Infraorder: Cucujiformia
- Family: Cerambycidae
- Subfamily: Lamiinae
- Tribe: Sternotomini
- Genus: Sternotomis
- Species: S. ducalis

Binomial name
- Sternotomis ducalis (Klug, 1835)

Synonyms
- Lamia ducalis Klug, 1835; Sternotomis aper Percheron, 1836; Sternotomis ducalis var. philosophica Thomson, 1857; Sternotomis philosophica Thomson, 1857

= Sternotomis ducalis =

Species of beetle

Sternotomis ducalis is a species of beetle belonging to the family Cerambycidae.

== Description ==
Sternotomis ducalis can reach a body length of 28–34 millimetres (1.1–1.3 in). Head and pronotum are mainly black, while the surface of the elytra varies from yellowish-greenish to reddish. Femora and tibiae are usually black. Antennae are black and longer than the insect.

== Distribution ==
This species can be found in Gambia, São Tomé and Príncipe, Senegal.
