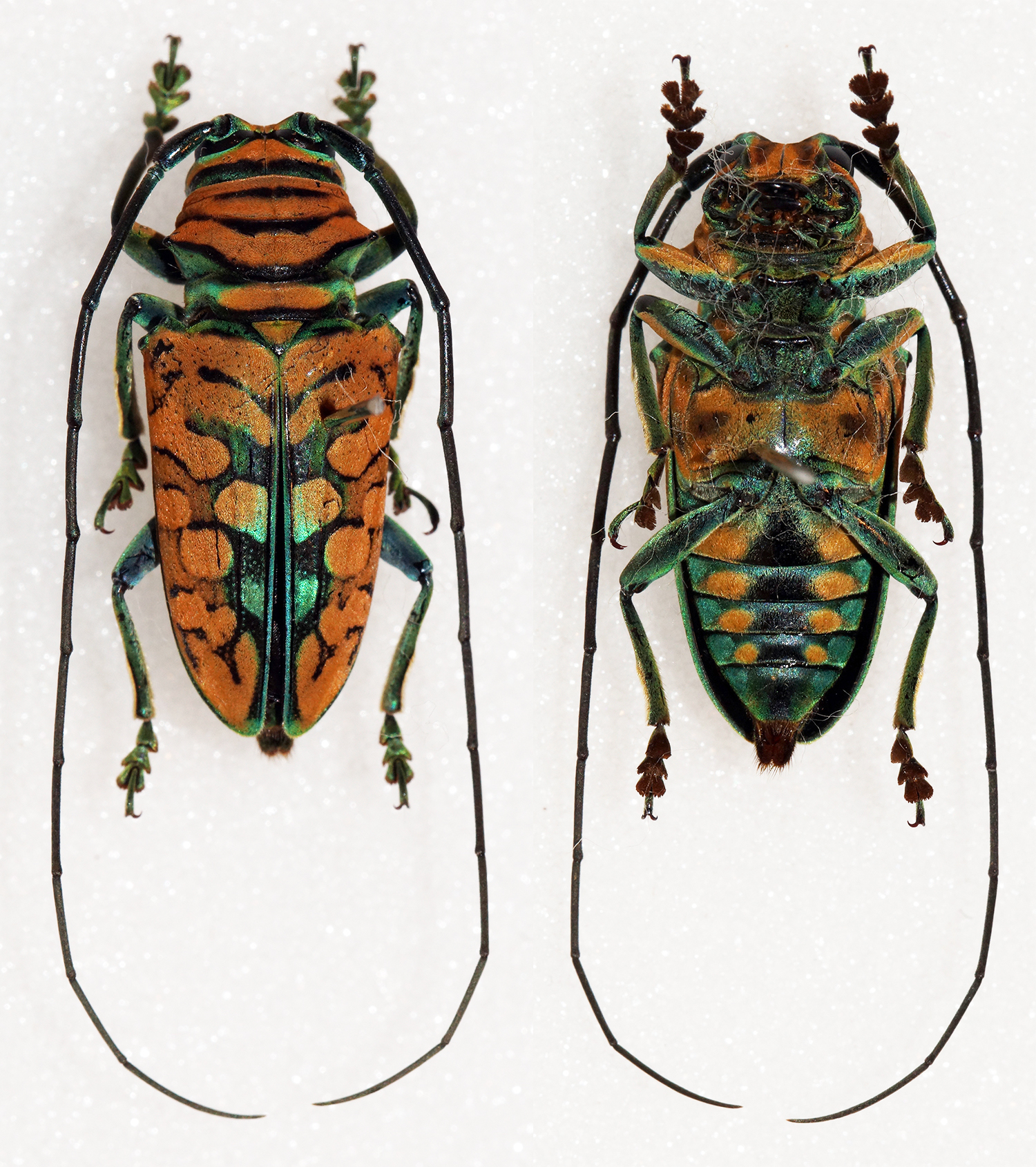
- Sternotomis strandi

Scientific classification
- Kingdom: Animalia
- Phylum: Arthropoda
- Class: Insecta
- Order: Coleoptera
- Suborder: Polyphaga
- Infraorder: Cucujiformia
- Family: Cerambycidae
- Subfamily: Lamiinae
- Tribe: Sternotomini
- Genus: Sternotomis
- Species: S. strandi

Binomial name
- Sternotomis strandi Breuning, 1935

Synonyms
- Sternotomis strandi Breuning, 1935; Sternotomis strandi intermedia Allard, 1993; Sternotomis strandi prasina Allard, 1993

= Sternotomis strandi =

Species of beetle

Sternotomis strandi is a species of beetle in the family Cerambycidae, found in Sub-Saharan Africa. It was described by Stephan von Breuning in 1935.
