= Sternoharpya =

Scientific classification
- Kingdom: Animalia
- Phylum: Arthropoda
- Class: Insecta
- Order: Coleoptera
- Suborder: Polyphaga
- Infraorder: Cucujiformia
- Family: Cerambycidae
- Tribe: Sternotomini
- Genus: Sternoharpya; Aurivillius, 1913
- Species: S. stictica

Binomial name
- Sternoharpya stictica Aurivillius, 1913

Genus of beetles

Sternoharpya is a monotypic beetle genus in the family Cerambycidae described by Per Olof Christopher Aurivillius in 1913. Its only species, Sternoharpya stictica, was described by the same author in the same year.
