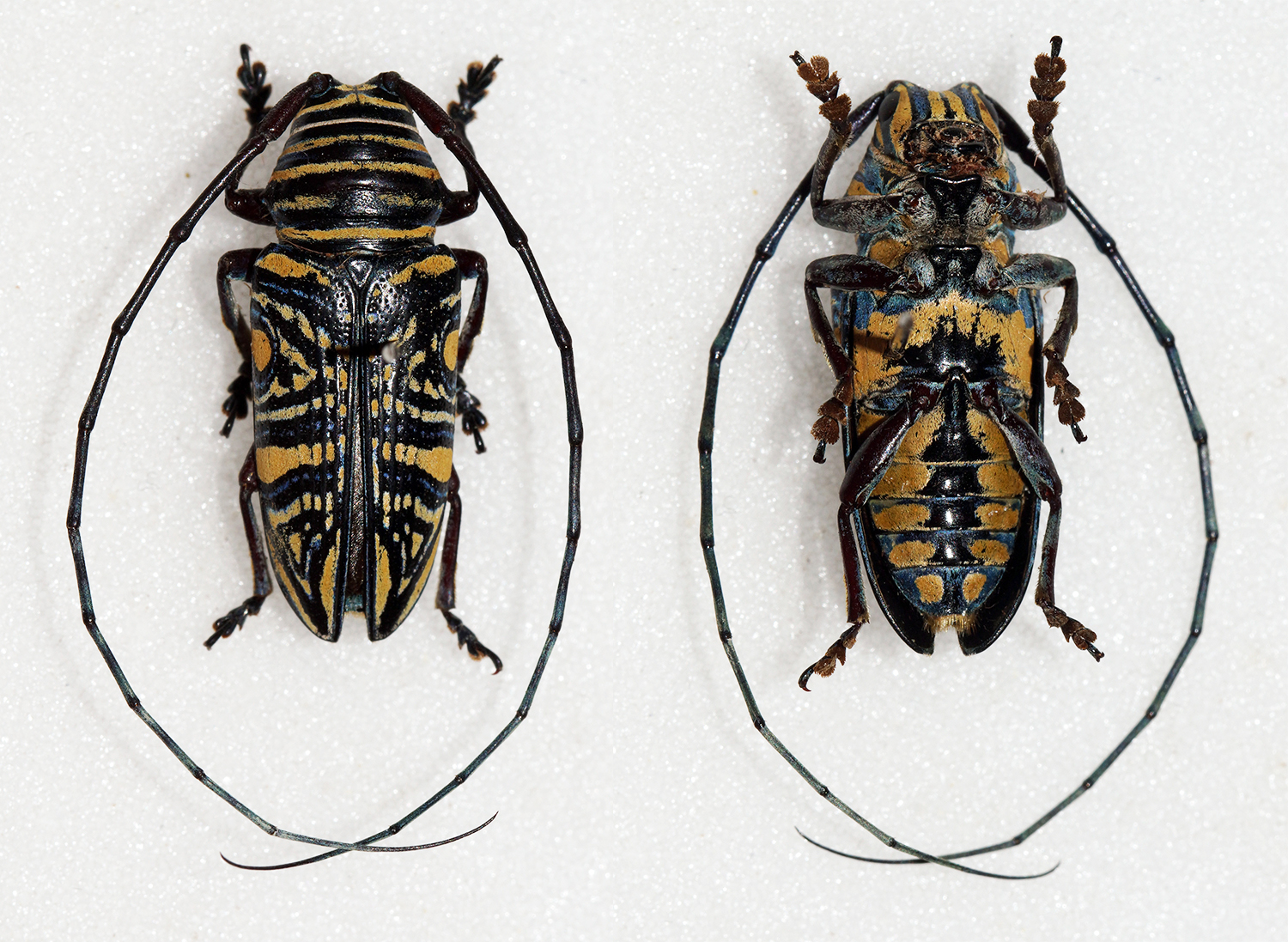

Scientific classification
- Kingdom: Animalia
- Phylum: Arthropoda
- Clade: Pancrustacea
- Class: Insecta
- Order: Coleoptera
- Suborder: Polyphaga
- Infraorder: Cucujiformia
- Family: Cerambycidae
- Genus: Zographus
- Species: Z. hieroglyphicus

Binomial name
- Zographus hieroglyphicus Gerstaecker, 1855

= Zographus hieroglyphicus =

Species of beetle

Zographus hieroglyphicus is a species of beetle in the family Cerambycidae. It was described by Carl Eduard Adolph Gerstaecker in 1855. It is found in Tanzania, Malawi, Kenya, and Mozambique.
