= Anatragoides =

Scientific classification
- Kingdom: Animalia
- Phylum: Arthropoda
- Class: Insecta
- Order: Coleoptera
- Suborder: Polyphaga
- Infraorder: Cucujiformia
- Family: Cerambycidae
- Tribe: Sternotomini
- Genus: Anatragoides

Genus of beetles

Anatragoides is a genus of longhorn beetles of the subfamily Lamiinae, containing the following species:

- Anatragoides cylindricus Breuning, 1938
- Anatragoides exigua (Kolbe, 1893)
