= Sternotomis vasco =

Scientific classification
- Kingdom: Animalia
- Phylum: Arthropoda
- Class: Insecta
- Order: Coleoptera
- Suborder: Polyphaga
- Infraorder: Cucujiformia
- Family: Cerambycidae
- Genus: Sternotomis
- Species: S. vasco

Binomial name
- Sternotomis vasco Coquerel, 1861

Synonyms
- Sternotomis gama Coquerel, 1861; Sternotomis vascoi Gemminger & Harold, 1873; Sternotomis gamae Gemminger & Harold, 1873; Sternotomis pulchra quadrifasciata Aurivillius, 1922; Cerambyx ornatus Olivier, 1795

Species of beetle

Sternotomis vasco is a species of longhorned beetle in the family Cerambycidae. It has a wide distribution in Sub-Saharan Africa.
