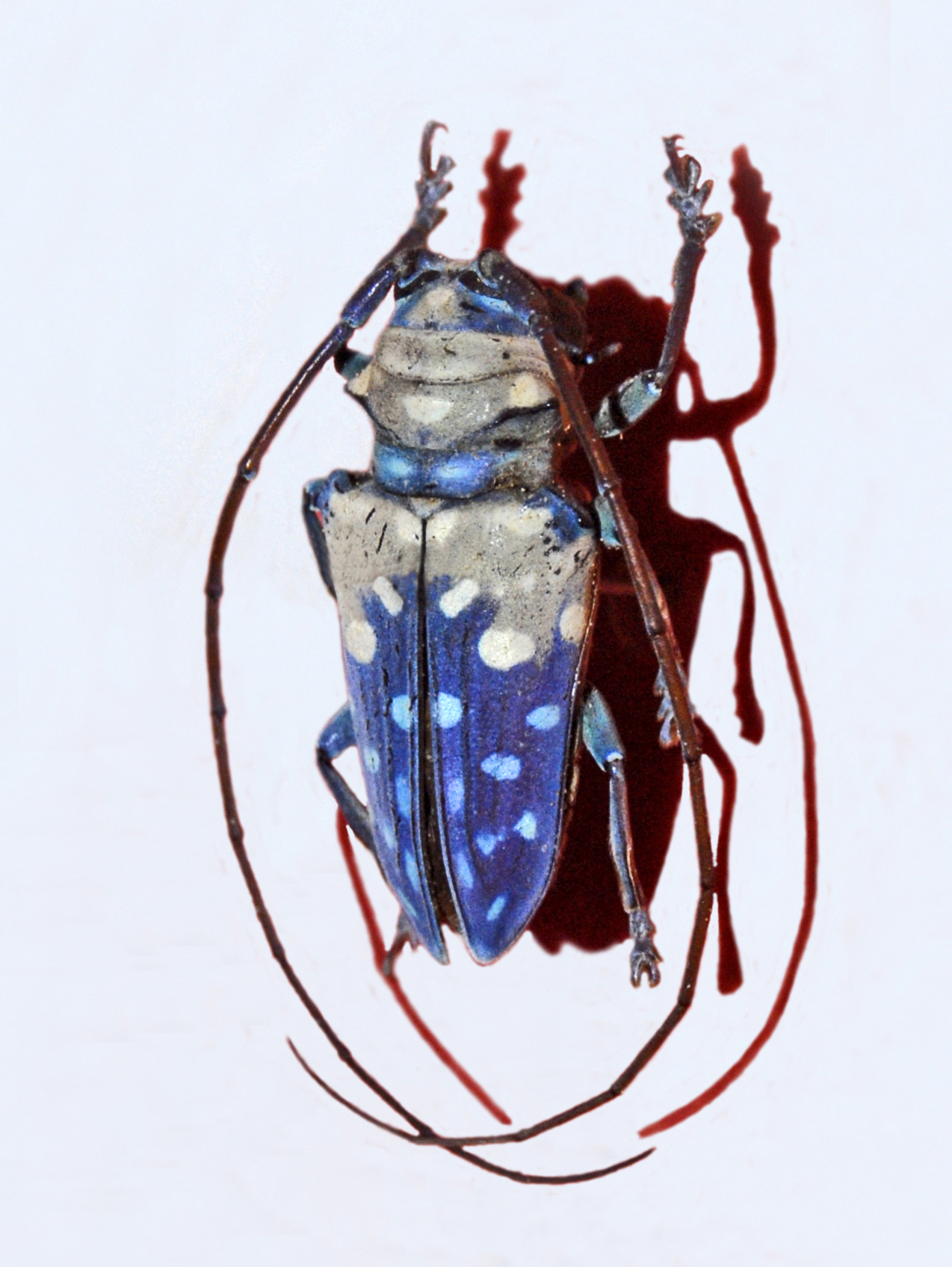
- Museum specimen of Sternotomis variabilis

Scientific classification
- Domain: Eukaryota
- Kingdom: Animalia
- Phylum: Arthropoda
- Class: Insecta
- Order: Coleoptera
- Suborder: Polyphaga
- Infraorder: Cucujiformia
- Family: Cerambycidae
- Genus: Sternotomis
- Species: S. variabilis

Binomial name
- Sternotomis variabilis Quedenfeldt, 1881

Synonyms
- List: Sternotomis variabilis Quedenfeldt, 1881; Sternotomis variabilis ab. brunnea Breuning, 1935 (Unav.); Sternotomis variabilis ab. cœrulescens Breuning, 1935 (Unav.); Sternotomis variabilis ab. rufofasciata Breuning, 1935 (Unav.); Sternotomis variabilis ab. semicyanea Breuning, 1935 (Unav.); Sternotomis variabilis ab. semirufescens Breuning, 1935 (Unav.); Sternotomis variabilis m. coerulescens Breuning, 1959 (Emend.) (Unav.); Sternotomis variabilis brunnea Allard, 1993; Sternotomis variabilis coerulescens Allard, 1993; Sternotomis variabilis rufocyanea Allard, 1993; Sternotomis variabilis rufofasciata Allard, 1993; Sternotomis variabilis semicyanea Allard, 1993; Sternotomis variabilis semirufescens Allard, 1993

= Sternotomis variabilis =

Species of beetle

Sternotomis variabilis, the Lesser Jewel Longhorn Beetle, is a species of flat-faced longhorn beetles belonging to the family Cerambycidae.

== Description ==
Sternotomis variabilis can reach a body length of 23–24 millimetres (0.91–0.94 in). The colors and markings of these longhorn beetles are very variable (hence the Latin name of the species). The coloration may be blue, dark green, greyish green or reddish brown, with white, pale blue, yellow or ochreous markings. Usually a wide, ochreous transverse band partially covers the pronotum and the elytra.

== Distribution ==
This species can be found in Angola, Central African Republic, Democratic Republic of the Congo and Uganda.
