= Zographus nitidus =

Scientific classification
- Domain: Eukaryota
- Kingdom: Animalia
- Phylum: Arthropoda
- Class: Insecta
- Order: Coleoptera
- Suborder: Polyphaga
- Infraorder: Cucujiformia
- Family: Cerambycidae
- Genus: Zographus
- Species: Z. nitidus

Binomial name
- Zographus nitidus (Aurivillius, 1914)

Synonyms
- Zographus ugandicola Breuning, 1970; Quimalanca nitida Aurivillius, 1914

Species of beetle

Zographus nitidus is a species of beetle in the family Cerambycidae. It was described by Per Olof Christopher Aurivillius in 1914, originally Quimalanca. It is known from Uganda and the Democratic Republic of the Congo.
