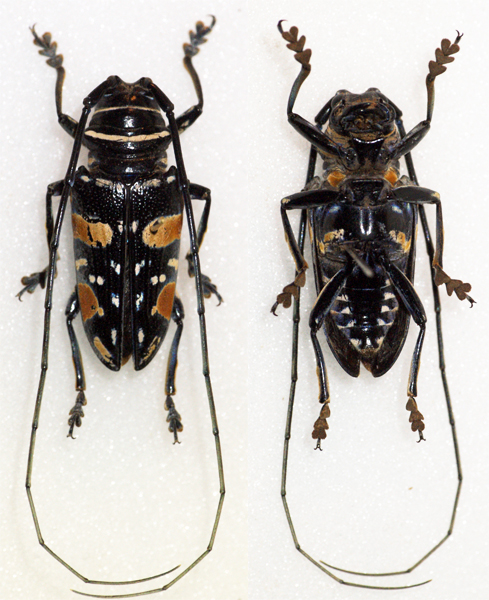
- Sternotomis fairmairei

Scientific classification
- Domain: Eukaryota
- Kingdom: Animalia
- Phylum: Arthropoda
- Class: Insecta
- Order: Coleoptera
- Suborder: Polyphaga
- Infraorder: Cucujiformia
- Family: Cerambycidae
- Genus: Sternotomis
- Species: S. fairmairei

Binomial name
- Sternotomis fairmairei Argod, 1899

= Sternotomis fairmairei =

Species of beetle

Sternotomis fairmairei is a species of beetle in the family Cerambycidae. It was described by Argod in 1899. It is known from Somalia.
