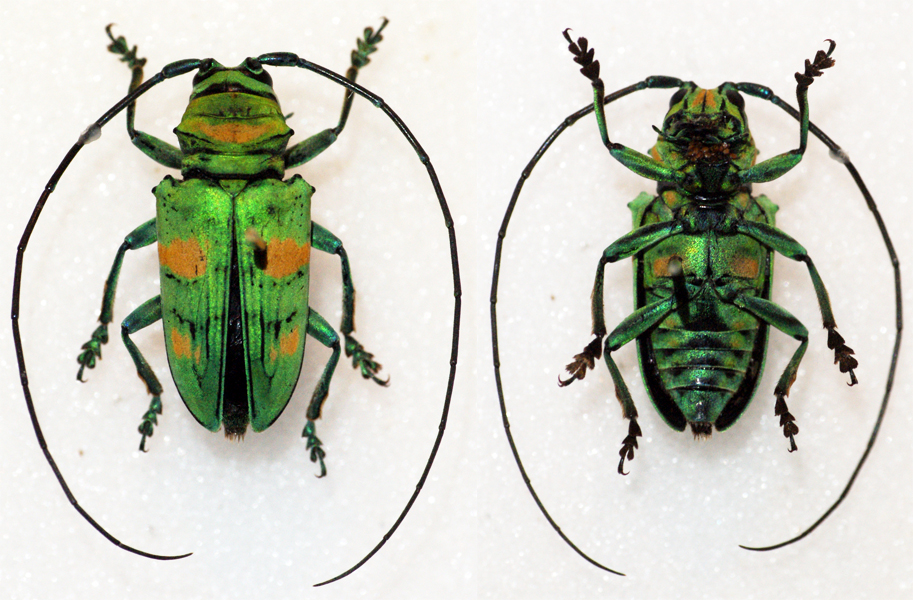
- Sternotomis amabilis

Scientific classification
- Domain: Eukaryota
- Kingdom: Animalia
- Phylum: Arthropoda
- Class: Insecta
- Order: Coleoptera
- Suborder: Polyphaga
- Infraorder: Cucujiformia
- Family: Cerambycidae
- Genus: Sternotomis
- Species: S. amabilis

Binomial name
- Sternotomis amabilis Hope, 1843

Synonyms
- List: Sternodonta amabilis Hope, 1843; Sternotomis submaculata Kolbe, 1893; Sternotomis amabilis v. kolbei Hintz, 1911; Sternotomis amabilis v. sylvia Hintz, 1911; Sternotomis amabilis ab. hintzi Breuning, 1935 (Unav.); Sternotomis chrysopras v. Joveri Lepesme, 1950; Sternotomis amabilis m. ochreomaculata Breuning, 1954 (Unav.); Sternotomis amabilis hintzi Allard, 1993; Sternotomis amabilis ochreomaculata Allard, 1993

= Sternotomis amabilis =

Species of beetle

Sternotomis amabilis is a species of beetle in the family Cerambycidae. It was described by Frederick William Hope in 1843.
