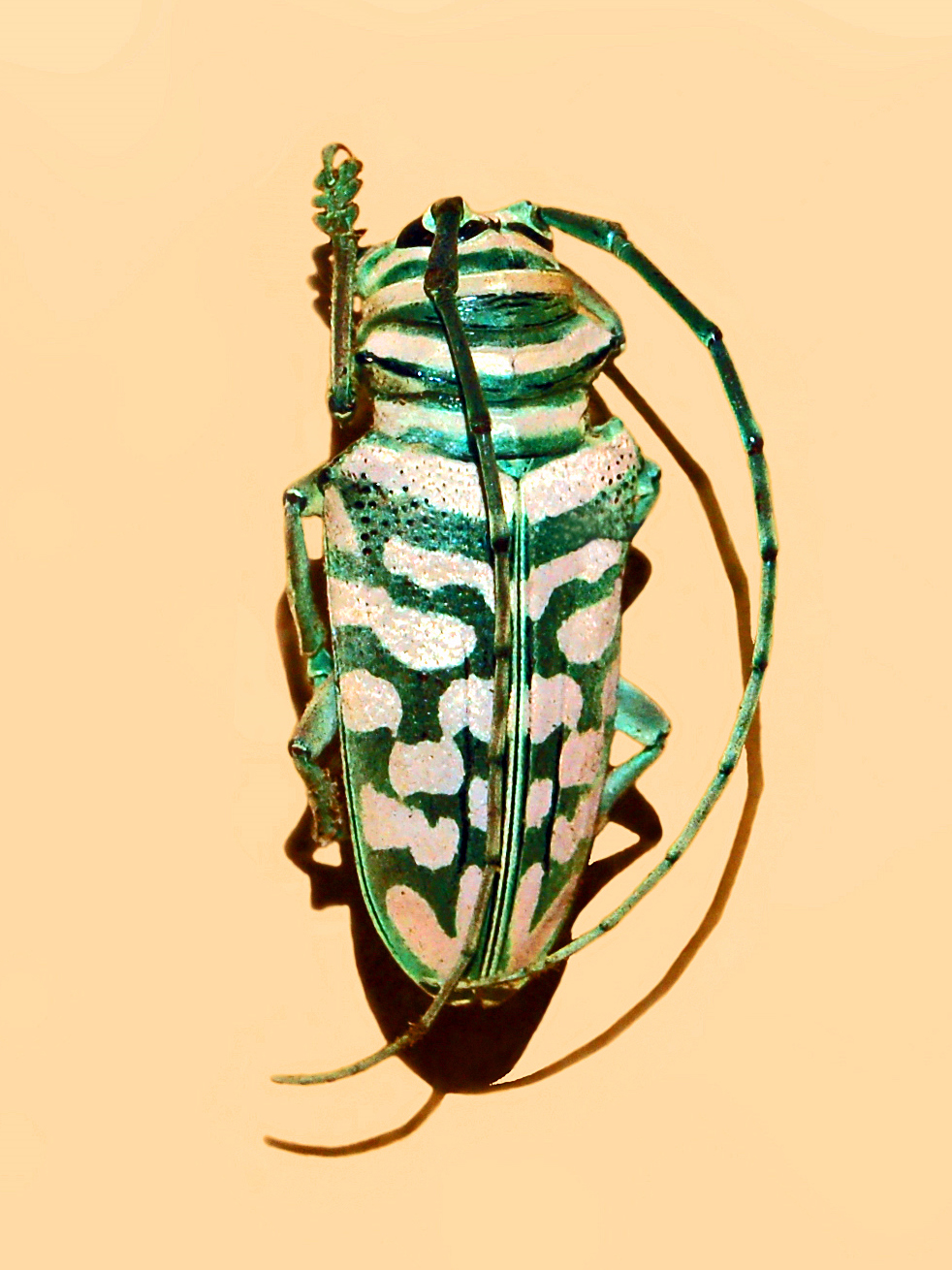
- Sternotomis bohemani var. bohndorffi from Uganda

Scientific classification
- Domain: Eukaryota
- Kingdom: Animalia
- Phylum: Arthropoda
- Class: Insecta
- Order: Coleoptera
- Suborder: Polyphaga
- Infraorder: Cucujiformia
- Family: Cerambycidae
- Genus: Sternotomis
- Species: S. bohemani

Binomial name
- Sternotomis bohemani Chevrolat, 1844

Synonyms
- List: Sternotomis bohemani Chevrolat, 1844; Lamia ferreti Westwood, 1844; Lamia bohemanni Westwood, 1844 (Missp.); Sternodonta ferretti Bertoloni, 1849 (Missp.); Sternotomis westwoodii Coquerel, 1861; Sternotomis westwoodi Gemminger & Harold, 1873 (Emend.); Sternotomis bohndorffii Waterhouse, 1886; Sternotomis aglaura Kolbe, 1894; Sternotomis zintgraffi Kolbe, 1894; Sternotomis bohemanni bohndorffi ab. viridula Breuning, 1935 (Unav.); Sternotomis bohemanni ignestii Breuning, 1940; Sternotomis bohemanni m. scholtzi Teocchi, 1988 (Unav.); Sternotomis bohemani dichrous Allard, 1993; Sternotomis bohemani kenyensis Allard, 1993; Sternotomis bohemani molleti Allard, 1993; Sternotomis bohemani pulcherrima Allard, 1993; Sternotomis bohemani usambarensis Allard, 1993; Sternotomis bohemani viridula Allard, 1993

= Sternotomis bohemani =

Sternotomis bohemanni

Species of beetle

Sternotomis bohemani (often misspelled "bohemanni") is a species of beetle belonging to the family Cerambycidae.

== Description ==
Sternotomis bohemani can reach a body length of about 25 mm. The upper surface of the body is of a pale green colour, varied with white fasciae and patches. Femora and tibiae are green. Antennae are green and longer than the insect.

== Distribution ==
This widespread species can be found in Tropical and Southern Africa.
