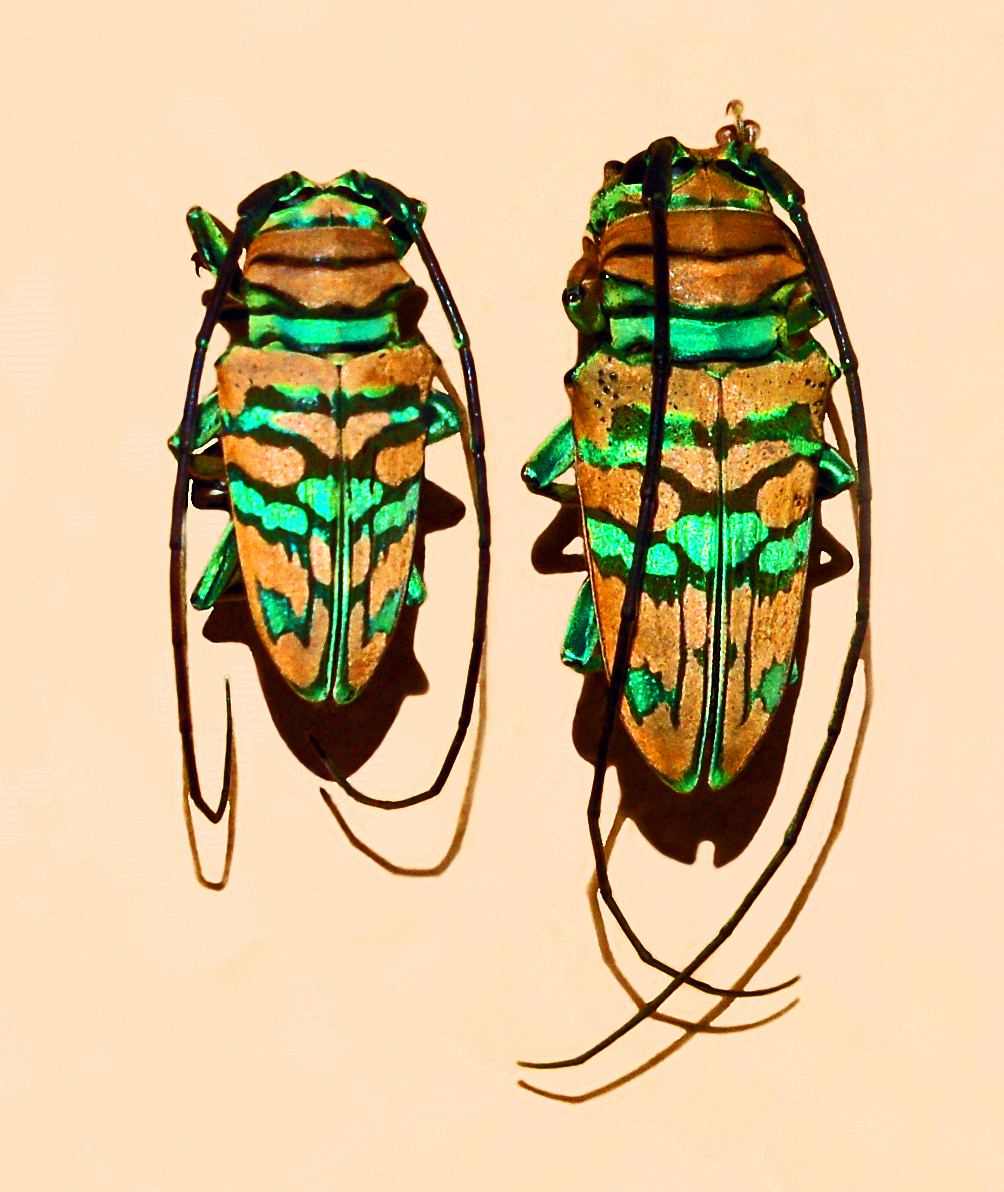
- Sternotomis pulchra var. obscura from Republic of the Congo. Male and female

Scientific classification
- Kingdom: Animalia
- Phylum: Arthropoda
- Class: Insecta
- Order: Coleoptera
- Suborder: Polyphaga
- Infraorder: Cucujiformia
- Family: Cerambycidae
- Genus: Sternotomis
- Species: S. pulchra

Binomial name
- Sternotomis pulchra (Drury, 1773)

Synonyms
- List: Cerambyx pulcher Drury, 1773; Lamia humeralis Fabricius, 1775; Sternotomis pulchra humeralis (Fabricius, 1775); Lamia bifasciata Fabricius, 1775 (Preocc.?); Cerambyx obscurus Voet, 1778 (Unav.); Cerambyx marmoratus Voet, 1778 (Unav.); Cerambyx jamaicensis Gmelin, 1790; Cerambyx luteo-obscurus Panzer, 1794 (Unav.); Cerambyx ornatus Olivier, 1800; Sternotomis pulchra ornata (Olivier, 1800); Lamia imperialis Fabricius, 1801; Lamia blanda Schönherr, 1817; Lamia venditaria Schönherr, 1817; Sternotomis marmorata Hintz, 1911; Sternotomis pulchra ab. maculata Breuning, 1935 (Unav.); Sternotomis pulchra ab. obscura Breuning, 1935 (Unav.); Sternotomis pulchra ab. viridescens Breuning, 1935 (Unav.); Sternotomis pulchra griseocyanea Allard, 1993; Sternotomis pulchra imatongensis Allard, 1993; Sternotomis pulchra maculata Allard, 1993; Sternotomis pulchra obscura Allard, 1993; Sternotomis pulchra picta Allard, 1993; Sternotomis pulchra polychrous Allard, 1993; Sternotomis pulchra tshuapana Allard, 1993; Sternotomis pulchra viridescens Allard, 1993; Sternotomis pulchra m. ivoriensis Teocchi et al. 2008 (Unav.)

= Sternotomis pulchra =

Species of beetle

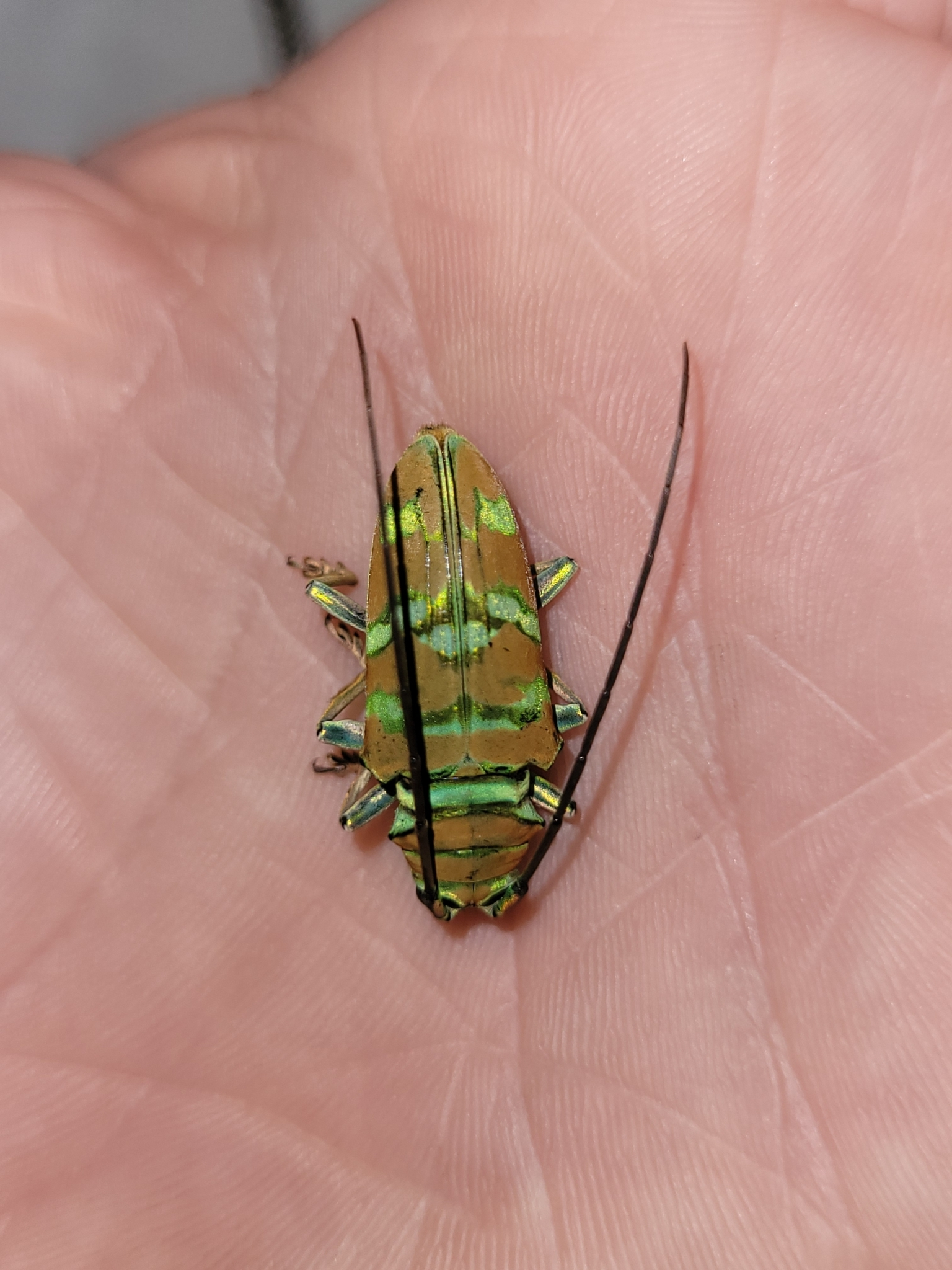
Sternotomis pulchra, Ivory Coast

Sternotomis pulchra is a species of beetle belonging to the family Cerambycidae.

== Description ==
Sternotomis pulchra can reach a body length of 20–25 millimetres (0.79–0.98 in). Head, thorax and elyra are orange-coloured. The thorax bears transversal black rings and a spine on each side. Elytra shows some black markings and light green patches. Femora and tibiae are green. Antennae are black and longer than the beetle. These cerambycids feed on Liberian coffee (Coffea liberica).

== Distribution ==
This species can be found in Senegal, Sierra Leone, Liberia, Ivory Coast, Ghana, Togo, Benin, Nigeria, Cameroon, Central African Republic, Zaire, Sudan, Republic of the Congo, Gabon, Uganda and Angola.
