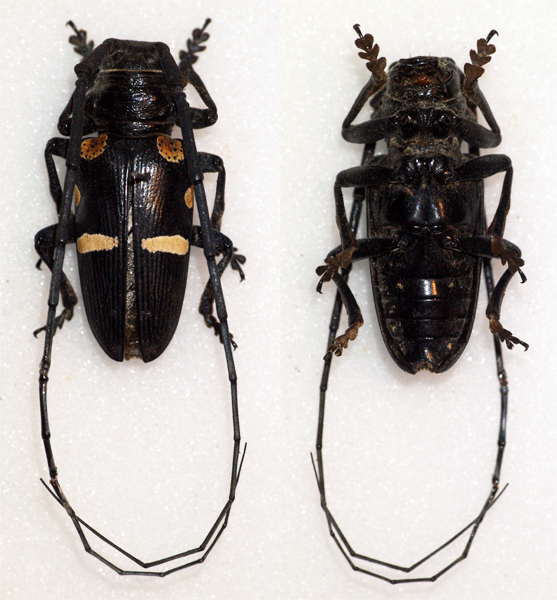

Scientific classification
- Domain: Eukaryota
- Kingdom: Animalia
- Phylum: Arthropoda
- Class: Insecta
- Order: Coleoptera
- Suborder: Polyphaga
- Infraorder: Cucujiformia
- Family: Cerambycidae
- Genus: Zographus
- Species: Z. plicaticollis

Binomial name
- Zographus plicaticollis Thomson, 1868

Synonyms
- Zographus oculatus var. ruschi Nonfried, 1906

= Zographus plicaticollis =

Species of beetle

Zographus plicaticollis is a species of beetle in the family Cerambycidae. It was described by James Thomson in 1868. It is known from South Africa and Namibia.
