= Zographus scabricollis =

Scientific classification
- Domain: Eukaryota
- Kingdom: Animalia
- Phylum: Arthropoda
- Class: Insecta
- Order: Coleoptera
- Suborder: Polyphaga
- Infraorder: Cucujiformia
- Family: Cerambycidae
- Genus: Zographus
- Species: Z. scabricollis

Binomial name
- Zographus scabricollis (Quedenfeldt, 1882)

Synonyms
- Quimalanca scabricollis Quedenfeldt, 1882

Species of beetle

Zographus scabricollis is a species of beetle in the family Cerambycidae. It was described by Quedenfeldt in 1882, originally under the genus Quimalanca. It has a wide distribution in Africa.
