= Anatragoides exigua =

Scientific classification
- Kingdom: Animalia
- Phylum: Arthropoda
- Class: Insecta
- Order: Coleoptera
- Suborder: Polyphaga
- Infraorder: Cucujiformia
- Family: Cerambycidae
- Genus: Anatragoides
- Species: A. exigua

Binomial name
- Anatragoides exigua (Kolbe, 1893)

Species of beetle

Anatragoides exigua is a species of beetle in the family Cerambycidae. It was described by Hermann Julius Kolbe in 1893. It is known from Angola and the Democratic Republic of the Congo.
