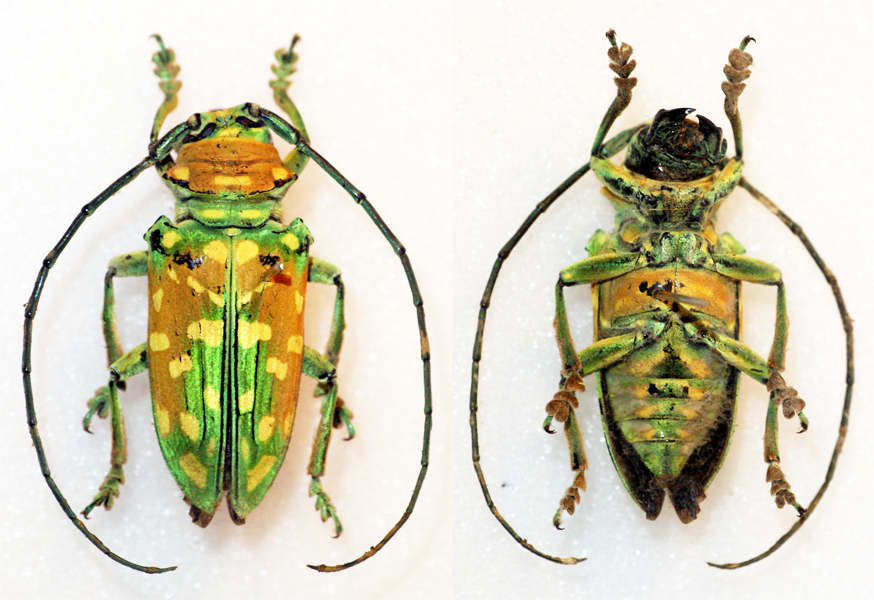
- Sternotomis flavomaculata

Scientific classification
- Domain: Eukaryota
- Kingdom: Animalia
- Phylum: Arthropoda
- Class: Insecta
- Order: Coleoptera
- Suborder: Polyphaga
- Infraorder: Cucujiformia
- Family: Cerambycidae
- Genus: Sternotomis
- Species: S. flavomaculata

Binomial name
- Sternotomis flavomaculata Hintz, 1919

= Sternotomis flavomaculata =

Species of beetle

Sternotomis flavomaculata is a species of beetle in the family Cerambycidae. It was described by Hintz in 1919. It is known from Kenya, Cameroon, and the Democratic Republic of the Congo.

== Varietas ==
- Sternotomis flavomaculata var. semirubra Breuning, 1935
- Sternotomis flavomaculata var. flavescens Breuning, 1935
- Sternotomis flavomaculata var. virens Breuning, 1935
