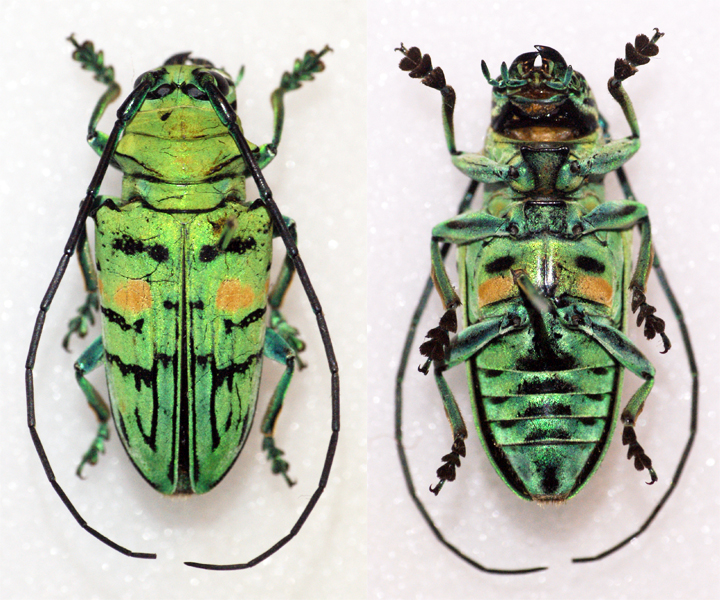

Scientific classification
- Kingdom: Animalia
- Phylum: Arthropoda
- Class: Insecta
- Order: Coleoptera
- Suborder: Polyphaga
- Infraorder: Cucujiformia
- Family: Cerambycidae
- Genus: Sternotomis
- Species: S. callais

Binomial name
- Sternotomis callais Fairmaire, 1891

= Sternotomis callais =

Species of beetle

Sternotomis callais, the African longhorn beetle, is a species of beetle in the family Cerambycidae. It was described by Léon Fairmaire in 1891. It is known from Cameroon, the Republic of the Congo, the Democratic Republic of the Congo, Equatorial Guinea, and Angola. It feeds on Coffea liberica var. dewevrei.

== Brilliant green coloration ==
The scales on the African longhorn beetle exhibit a brilliant green color due to a photonic crystal-like periodic cuticle network, and the three-dimensional network of the cuticle was found to be modelled appropriately by the I-WP photonic crystal. Although described mathematically in 1970, this is the first time this kind of photonic crystal structure has been observed in nature.

The I-WP-type minimal surface was mathematically found by Schoen in 1970, was named "I-graph-Wrapped Package graph surface" because it reminded Schoen of the arrangement of string on a simply wrapped package. The wavelength range of the green color corresponds to the frequency of the photonic band gap.
