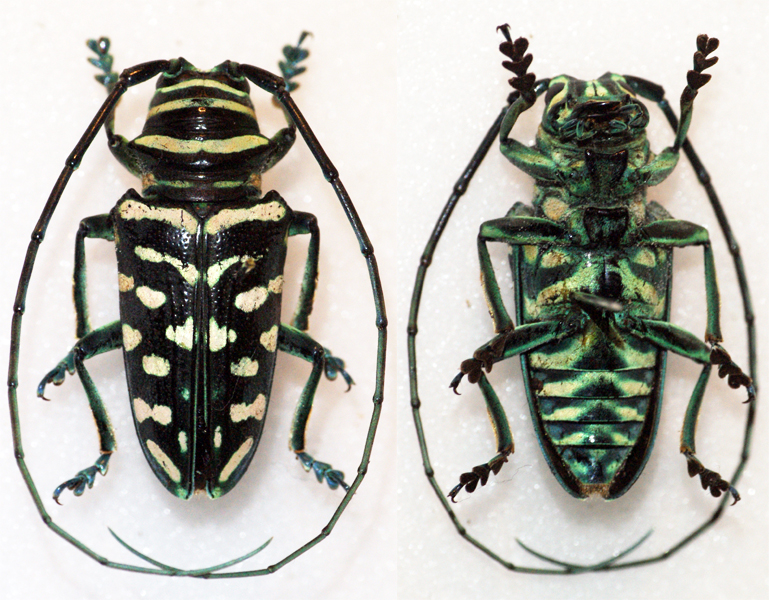

Scientific classification
- Kingdom: Animalia
- Phylum: Arthropoda
- Class: Insecta
- Order: Coleoptera
- Suborder: Polyphaga
- Infraorder: Cucujiformia
- Family: Cerambycidae
- Genus: Sternotomis
- Species: S. virescens

Binomial name
- Sternotomis virescens (Westwood, 1845)

Synonyms
- Lamia (Sternotomis) virescens Westwood, 1845; Sternotomis dubocagii Coquerel, 1861; Sternotomis consularis Harold, 1878

= Sternotomis virescens =

Species of beetle

Sternotomis virescens is a species of beetle in the family Cerambycidae. It was described by John O. Westwood in 1845. It has a wide distribution in Africa. It feeds on Coffea canephora.
