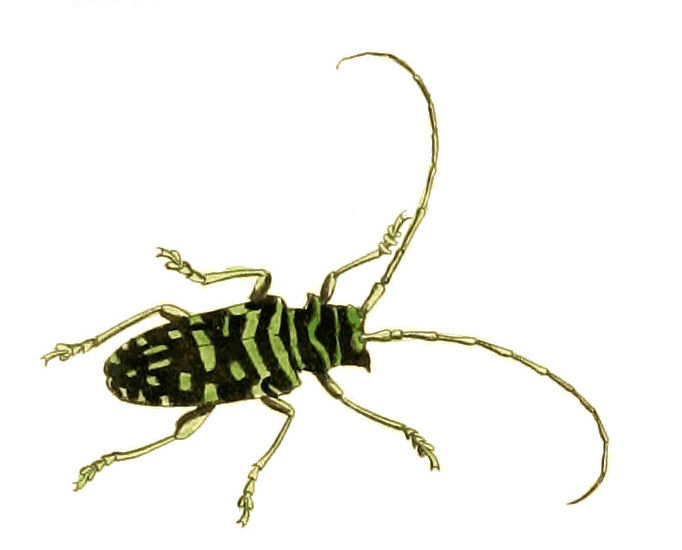

Scientific classification
- Domain: Eukaryota
- Kingdom: Animalia
- Phylum: Arthropoda
- Class: Insecta
- Order: Coleoptera
- Suborder: Polyphaga
- Infraorder: Cucujiformia
- Family: Cerambycidae
- Genus: Sternotomis
- Species: S. mirabilis

Binomial name
- Sternotomis mirabilis (Drury, 1773)

Synonyms
- Cerambyx mirabilis Drury, 1773; Lamia targavei Westwood, 1844; Sternotomis mirabilis ab. transeuns Breuning, 1935 (Unav.); Sternotomis mirabilis transeuns Allard, 1993

= Sternotomis mirabilis =

Species of beetle

Sternotomis mirabilis is a genus of long-horned beetle belonging to the family Cerambycidae. It was first described in 1773 by Dru Drury from Sierra Leone.

== Description ==
Varied with beautiful green and black colours, the former exceedingly bright. Head green, with two others running downwards from the eyes. Jaws with the upper part green, the extremities black, with four green palpi. Antennae black, ten-jointed, the basal joint being thickest. Thorax green, with black streaks running round it, the sides terminating in an obtuse point. Scutellum very small, black, and triangular. Elytra black and margined, beautifully streaked and spotted with green: the streaks running across the anterior part, the spots placed near the extremities. Abdomen green, with black rings. Legs green, streaked with black. Tarsi green at top, brown beneath. Body length a little less than an inch (22 mm).
