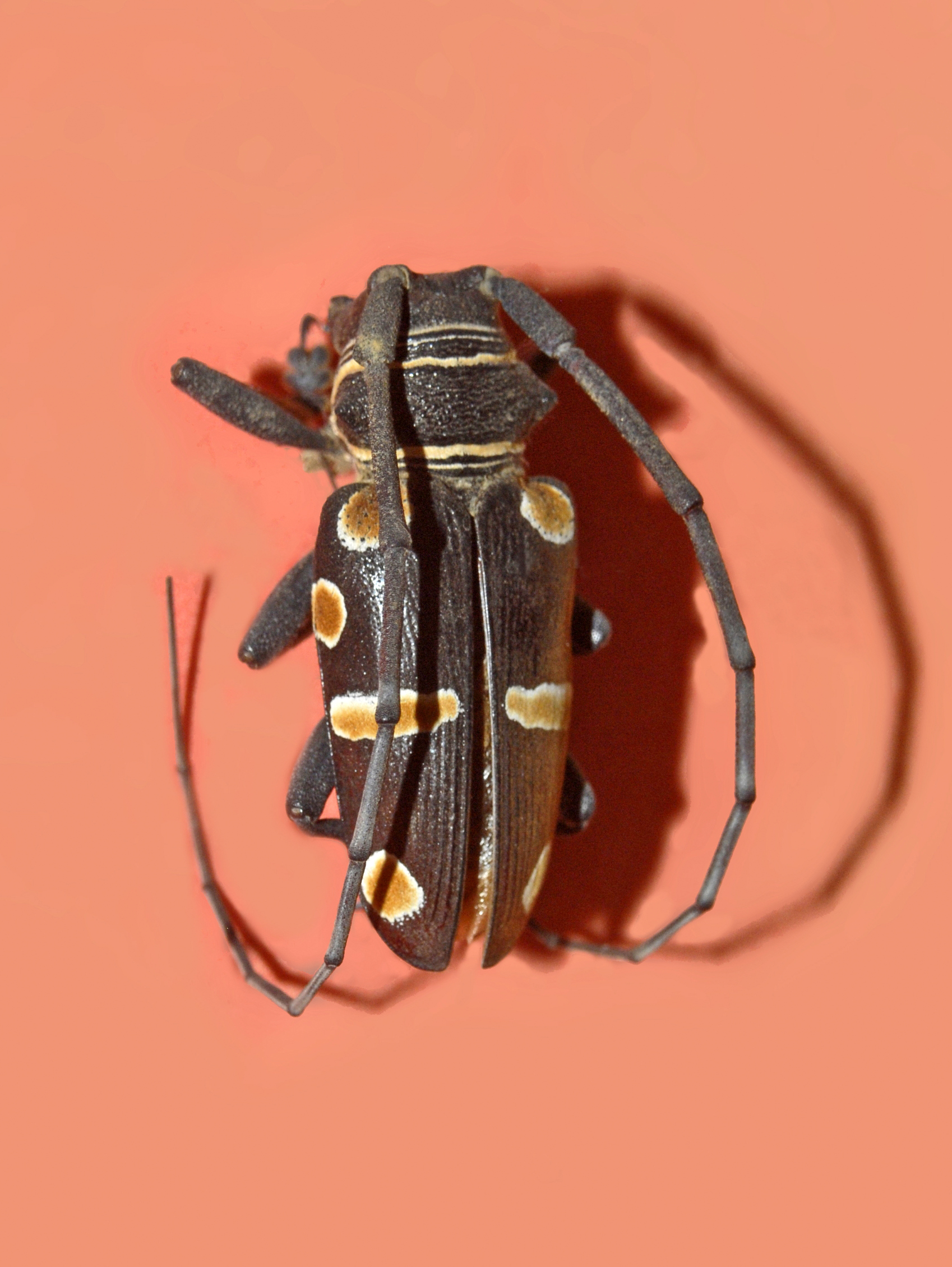
- Museum specimen of Zographus oculator

Scientific classification
- Kingdom: Animalia
- Phylum: Arthropoda
- Class: Insecta
- Order: Coleoptera
- Suborder: Polyphaga
- Infraorder: Cucujiformia
- Family: Cerambycidae
- Genus: Zographus
- Species: Z. oculator

Binomial name
- Zographus oculator (Fabricius, 1775)

Synonyms
- Cerambyx maculatus Voet, 1778 nec Goeze, 1777; Cerambyx ocellatus Degeer, 1778; Cerambyx octo-oculatus Thunberg, 1787; Cerambyx oculator (Fabricius) Gmelin, 1790; Lamia oculator Fabricius, 1775; Zographus oculator m. conjunctus Téocchi, 1998

= Zographus oculator =

Species of beetle

Zographus oculator, the Orange-eyed Long-horn Beetle, is a species of flat-faced longhorn beetles belonging to the family Cerambycidae.

== Description ==
Zographus oculator can reach a body length of 25–35 millimetres (0.98–1.38 in). The basic colour is black, with a transverse median band and large yellow orange-centred pair of eye-like spots (hence the Latin name oculator, from the Latin word oculus, meaning eye) located at the base, towards the tips and at the sides of the elytra. These beetles show narrow yellow lines across the head and the thorax, two large rounded tubercles at the sides of the thorax and tiny wrinkles on the elytra.

== Distribution ==
This species can be found in Namibia and South Africa.
