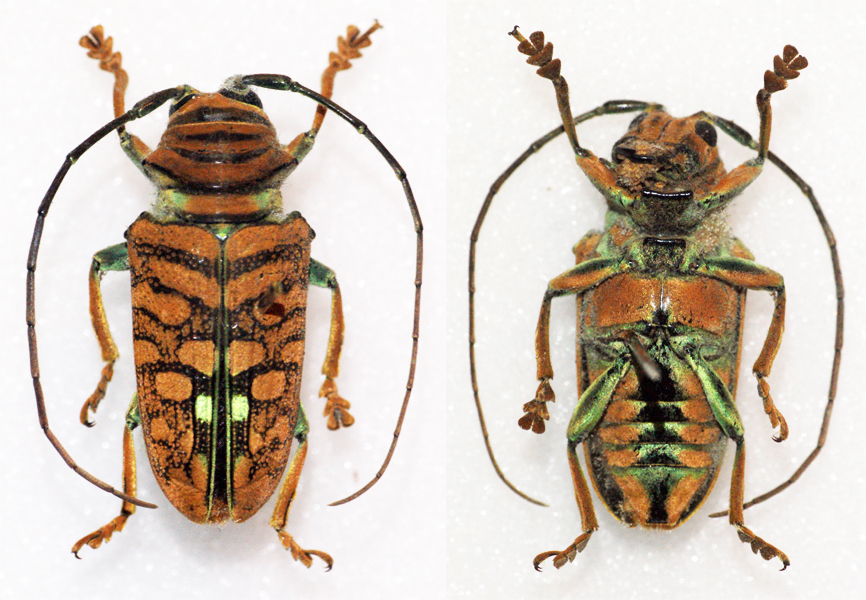
- Sternotomis chrysopras

Scientific classification
- Kingdom: Animalia
- Phylum: Arthropoda
- Clade: Pancrustacea
- Class: Insecta
- Order: Coleoptera
- Suborder: Polyphaga
- Infraorder: Cucujiformia
- Family: Cerambycidae
- Subfamily: Lamiinae
- Tribe: Sternotomini
- Genus: Sternotomis
- Species: S. chrysopras

Binomial name
- Sternotomis chrysopras (Westwood, 1844)

Synonyms
- Cerambyx chrysopras Voet, 1778; Lamia chrysopras Westwood, 1844; Sternotomis chrysopras joveri Jover, 1954; Sternotomis chrysopras reducta Lepesme, 1950

= Sternotomis chrysopras =

Species of beetle

Sternotomis chrysopras is a species of beetle in the family Cerambycidae. It has a wide distribution in Africa. It feeds on Artocarpus altilis, Theobroma cacao, Coffea liberica, and Coffea canephora. While originally named by Voet in 1778, the name was not validly published until 1817. Voet's 1778 work fails to fulfill the requirement in ICZN Article 11.4 that a work must be consistently binomial; none of Voet's 1778 names, including S. chrysopras, are available.
