= Johann Eusebius Voet =

Dutch entomologist (1706–1778)

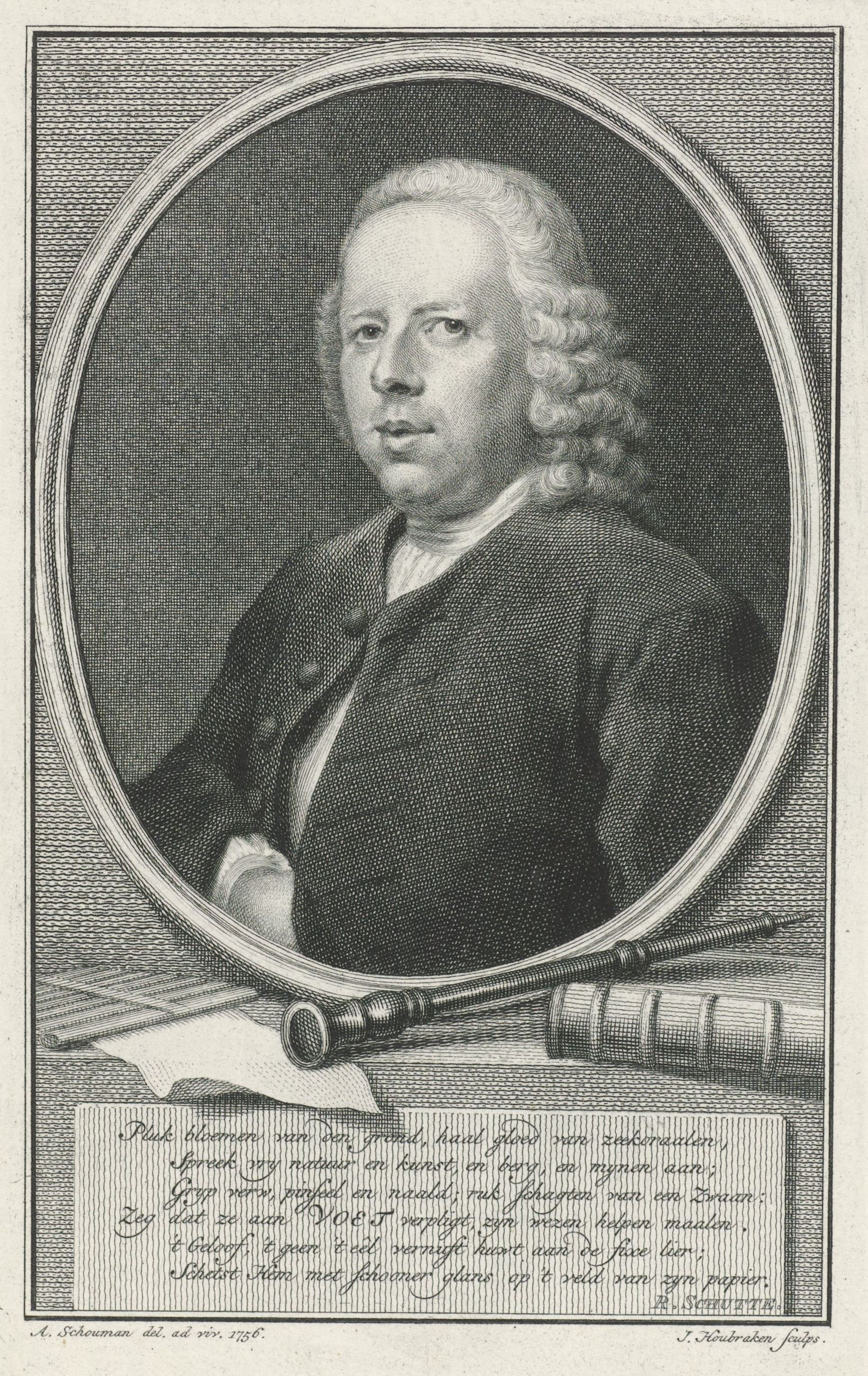
Johannes Voet (print by Jacob Houbraken)

Johannes Eusebius Voet (24 January 1706 in Dordrecht – 28 September 1778 in The Hague) was a Dutch physician, poet, illustrator, and entomologist. Johannes was the son of Carel Burchat Voet (1671-1745) who was court-painter to the Earl of Portland and also an entomologist.

== Entomologist and poet ==
Voet is the author of Catalogus Systematicus Coleopterorum. This work, one of the earliest to follow Linnaeus', contains numerous scientific names created by Voet, but fails to fulfill the requirement in the ICZN (Article 11.4) that for scientific names to be available, the entirety of the work in which they appear must be consistently binomial (the standard established by Linnaeus); Voet's names varied from 2 to 5 names in series, thus violating this requirement, so none of Voet's names, even those which happened to be binomial, are available for use in modern scientific literature, though many were later used by other authors who thereby gained official authorship of the names themselves (e.g. Sternotomis chrysopras), while other authorities, unaware of the provisions of the ICZN, still occasionally cite Voet as the author. He was also a poet. His debut was Stichtelyke gedichten en gezangen (1744), and in 1764 he published a translation of the Psalms. 82 of his translations were included in the official Dutch translation of the Psalms published in 1773.
