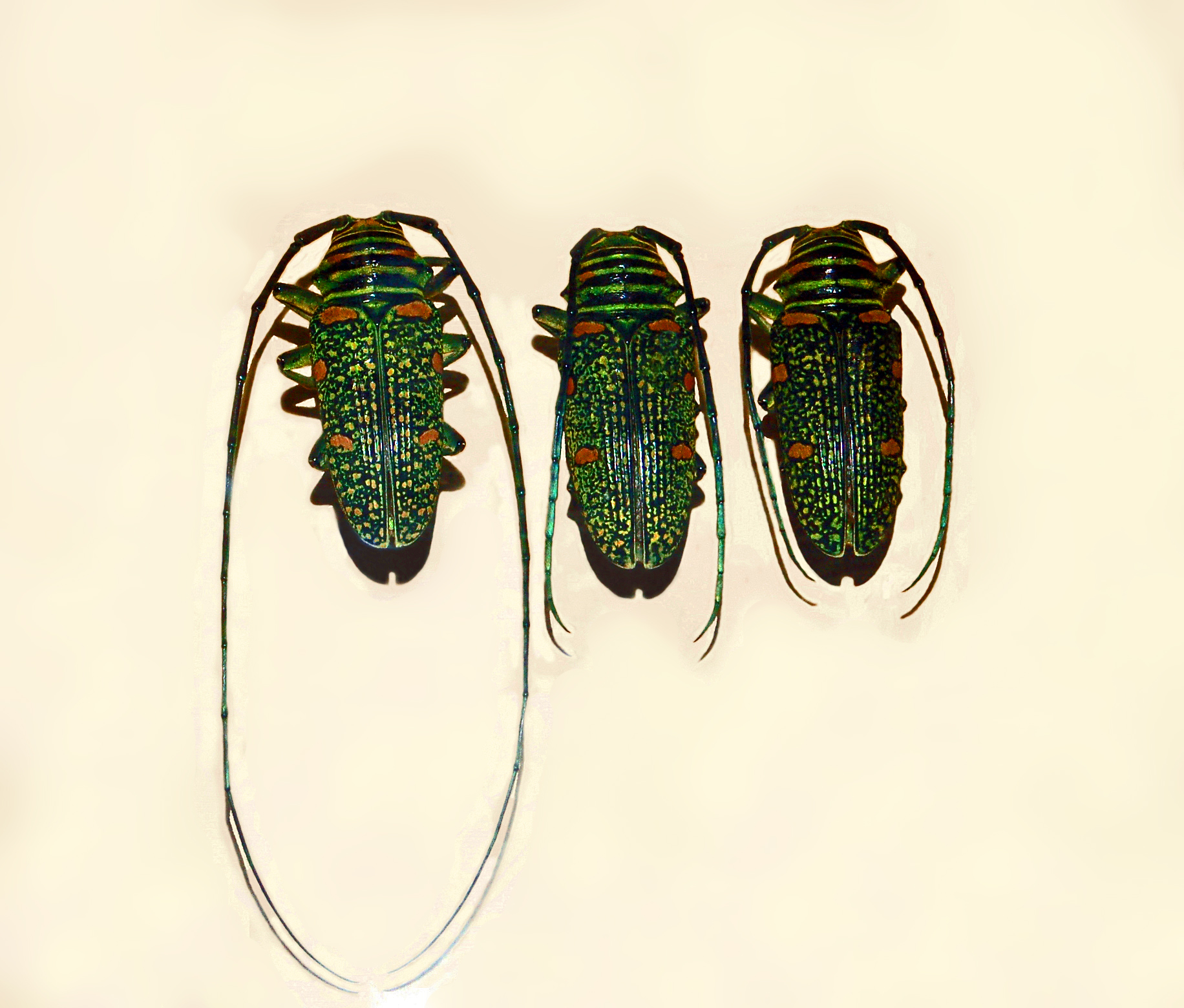
- Zographus regalis from Guinea-Bissau

Scientific classification
- Kingdom: Animalia
- Phylum: Arthropoda
- Class: Insecta
- Order: Coleoptera
- Suborder: Polyphaga
- Infraorder: Cucujiformia
- Family: Cerambycidae
- Tribe: Sternotomini
- Genus: Zographus; Dejean, 1835

Synonyms
- Quimalanca Thomson, 1868

= Zographus =

Genus of beetles

Zographus is a genus of beetle belonging to the family Cerambycidae.

== List of species ==
- Zographus aulicus Bertoloni, 1849
- Zographus cingulatus Aurivillius, 1913
- Zographus hieroglyphicus Gerstäcker, 1855
- Zographus lineatus (Quedenfeldt, 1882)
- Zographus nitidus (Aurivillius, 1914)
- Zographus niveipectus (Quedenfeldt, 1888)
- Zographus niveisparsus (Chevrolat, 1844)
- Zographus oculator (Fabricius, 1775)
- Zographus plicaticollis Thomson, 1868
- Zographus pulverulentus Nonfried, 1906
- Zographus quadrimaculatus Gilmour, 1956
- Zographus regalis (Browning, 1776)
- Zographus scabricollis (Quedenfeldt, 1882)
