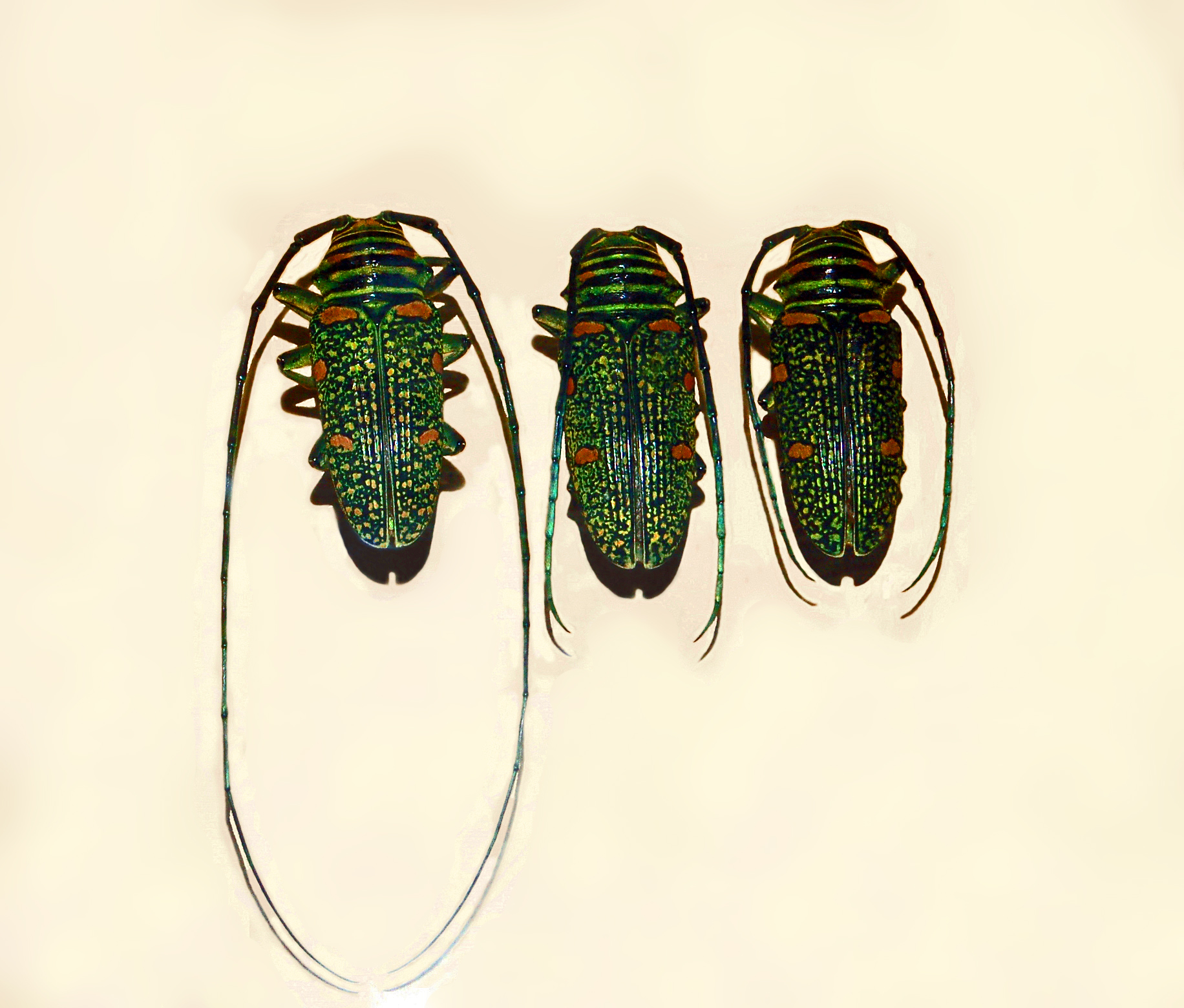
- Zographus regalis from Guinea-Bissau

Scientific classification
- Domain: Eukaryota
- Kingdom: Animalia
- Phylum: Arthropoda
- Class: Insecta
- Order: Coleoptera
- Suborder: Polyphaga
- Infraorder: Cucujiformia
- Family: Cerambycidae
- Genus: Zographus
- Species: Z. regalis

Binomial name
- Zographus regalis (Browning, 1776)

Synonyms
- Cerambyx regalis Browning, 1776; Lamia regalis (Browning) Fabricius, 1781; Quimalaca regalis (Browning) Thomson, 1868; Sternodonta regalis (Browning) Laporte de Castelnau, 1840; Zographus regalis centralis Allard, 1993

= Zographus regalis =

Species of beetle

Zographus regalis is a species of beetle belonging to the family Cerambycidae.

== Description ==
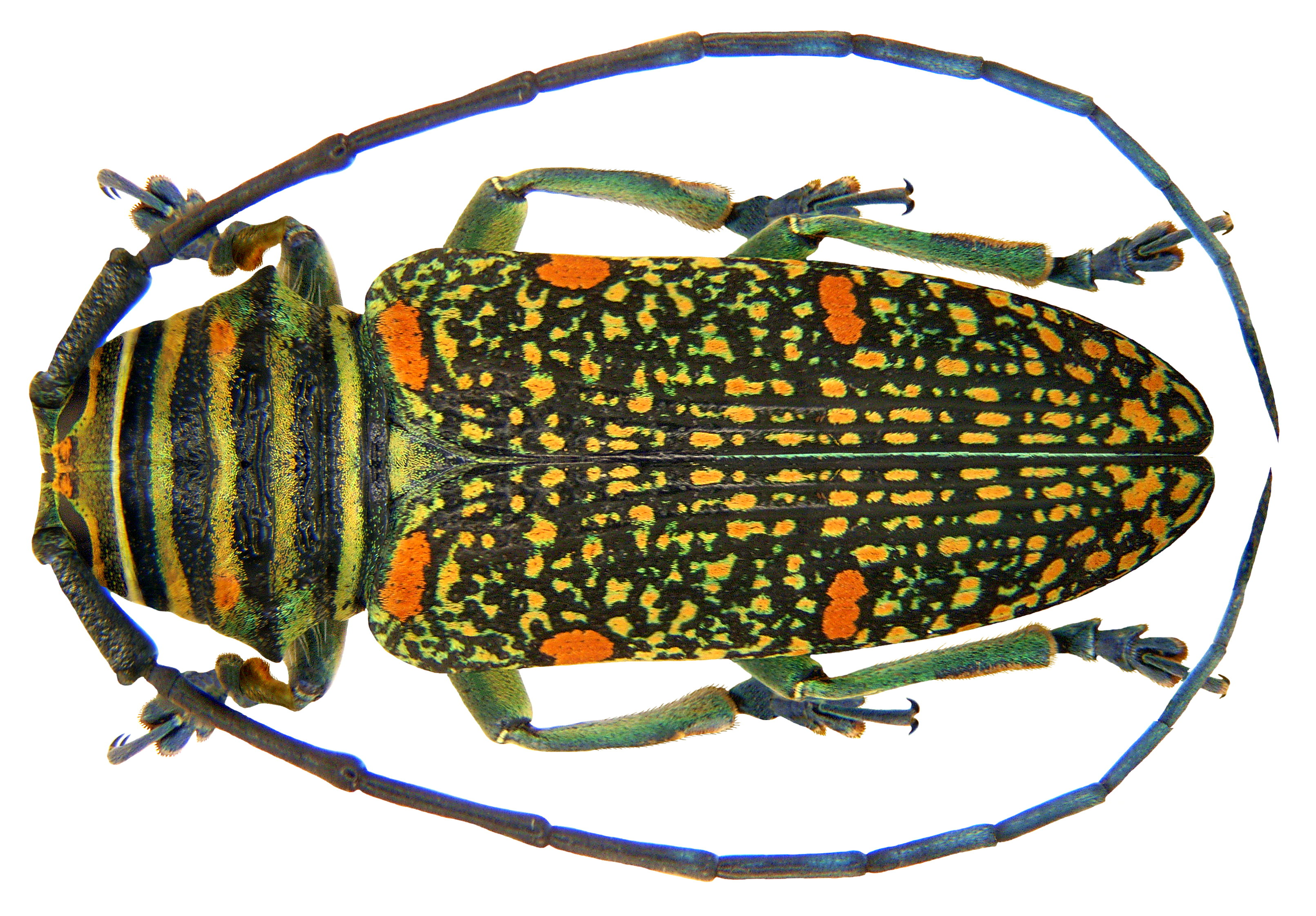
Zographus regalis regalis

Zographus regalis can reach a body length of 21–27 millimetres (0.83–1.06 in). The basic colour is black, with shining green and yellowish spots. Elytra bears six large chocolate patches on the edges, while the protorax shows several black and green transversal stripes. The antennae are particularly long and slender. These cerambycids are wood borers of cashew (Anacardium occidentale) and of "wawa" (Triplochiton scleroxylon).

== Distribution ==
This species can be found in Senegal, Guinea-Bissau, Sierra Leone, Liberia, Ivory Coast, Togo, Benin, Nigeria, Cameroon, Ghana, Central African Republic, Gabon, Democratic Republic of Congo, Zaire, Angola and Zambia.

== List of subspecies ==
- Zographus regalis lualabensis Le Moult, 1939
- Zographus regalis quadrimaculatoides Breuning, 1969
- Zographus regalis regalis (Browning, 1776)
