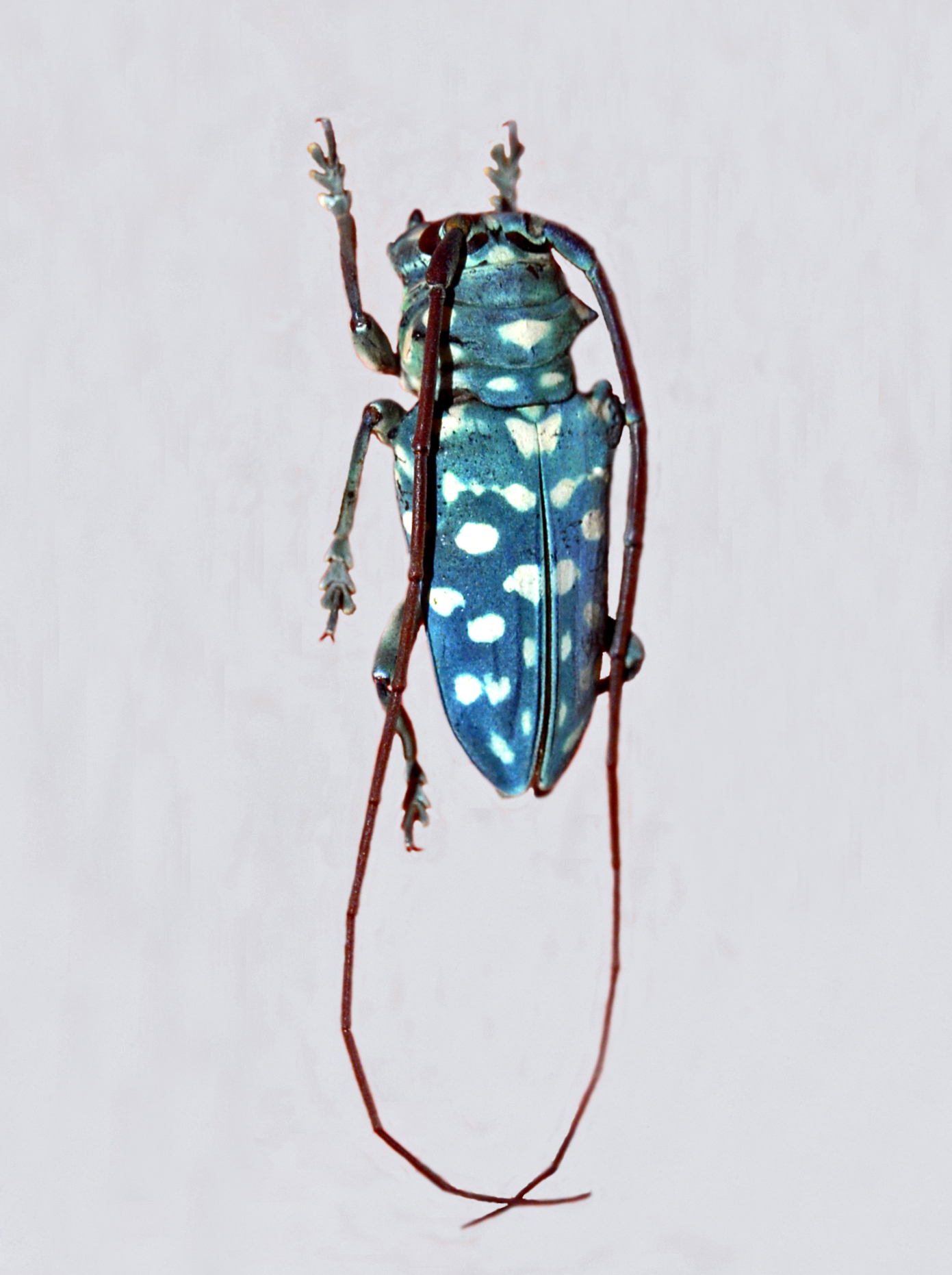
- Museum specimen of Sternotomis itzingeri

Scientific classification
- Kingdom: Animalia
- Phylum: Arthropoda
- Class: Insecta
- Order: Coleoptera
- Suborder: Polyphaga
- Infraorder: Cucujiformia
- Family: Cerambycidae
- Genus: Sternotomis
- Species: S. itzingeri

Binomial name
- Sternotomis itzingeri Breuning, 1935

Synonyms
- Sternotomis itzingeri m. viridiana Teocchi, 1992

= Sternotomis itzingeri =

Species of beetle

Sternotomis itzingeri is a species of flat-faced longhorn beetles belonging to the family Cerambycidae.

== Description ==
Sternotomis itzingeri can reach a body length of 18–26 millimetres (0.71–1.02 in). The colors and markings of these longhorn beetles are variable. The background is usually pale greyish blue, with white markings, but coloration may also be dark blue, dark green or completely brown, while marks may be light ochreous. Scutellum may be green or yellow.

== Distribution ==
This species can be found in Uganda, Kenya, Sudan, Democratic Republic of Congo, Tanzania and Zaire.
