= Zographus cingulatus =

Scientific classification
- Domain: Eukaryota
- Kingdom: Animalia
- Phylum: Arthropoda
- Class: Insecta
- Order: Coleoptera
- Suborder: Polyphaga
- Infraorder: Cucujiformia
- Family: Cerambycidae
- Genus: Zographus
- Species: Z. cingulatus

Binomial name
- Zographus cingulatus Aurivillius, 1913

Species of beetle

Zographus cingulatus is a species of beetle in the family Cerambycidae. It was described by Per Olof Christopher Aurivillius in 1913. It is known from the Democratic Republic of the Congo, Angola, and Malawi.
