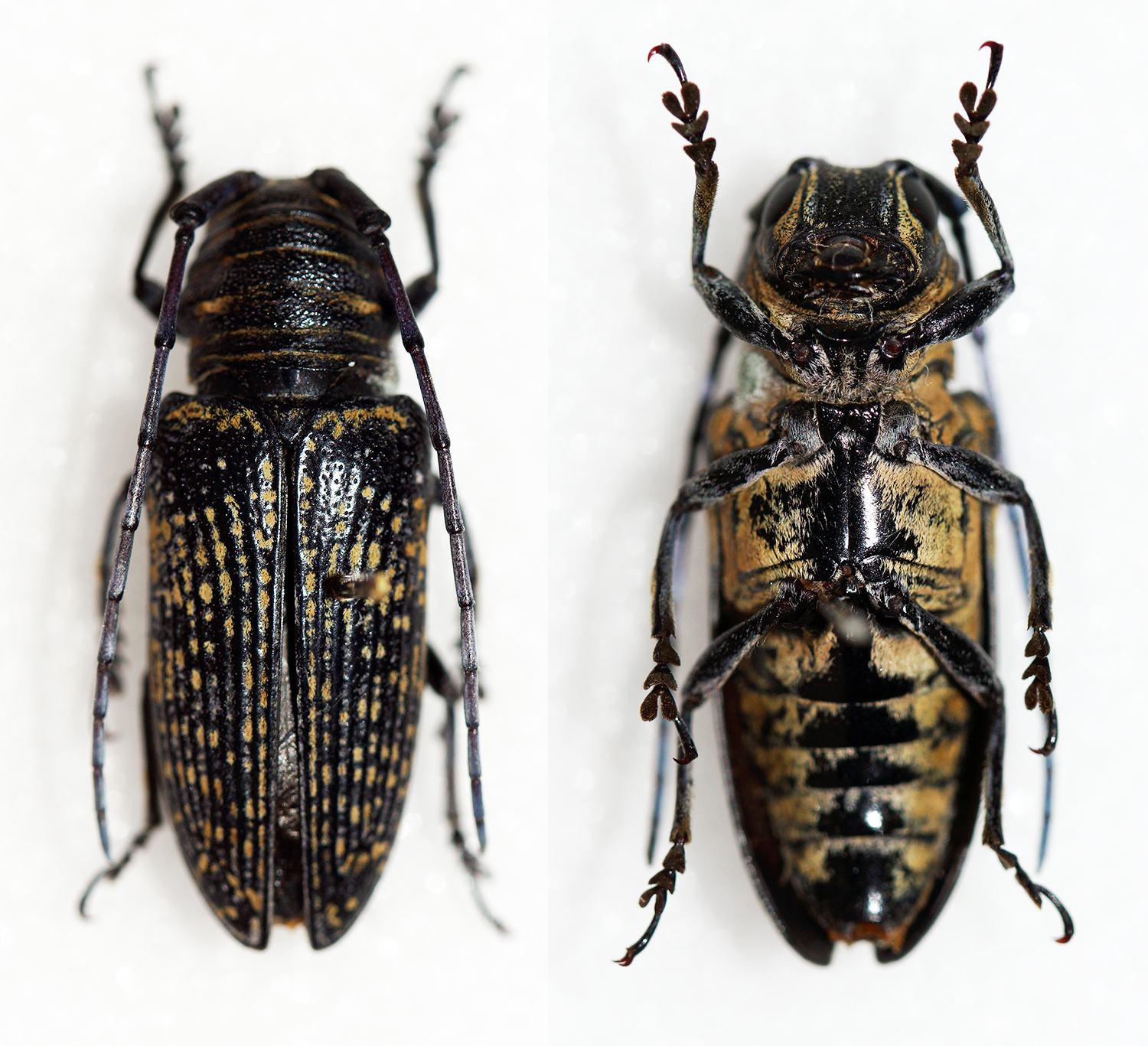

Scientific classification
- Domain: Eukaryota
- Kingdom: Animalia
- Phylum: Arthropoda
- Class: Insecta
- Order: Coleoptera
- Suborder: Polyphaga
- Infraorder: Cucujiformia
- Family: Cerambycidae
- Genus: Zographus
- Species: Z. lineatus

Binomial name
- Zographus lineatus (Quedenfeldt, 1882)

Synonyms
- Zographus modestus Péringuey, 1886; Quimalanca modesta (Péringuey, 1886); Quimalanca lineata Quedenfeldt, 1882

= Zographus lineatus =

Species of beetle

Zographus lineatus is a species of beetle in the family Cerambycidae. It was described by Quedenfeldt in 1882, originally under the genus Quimalanca. It has a wide distribution in Africa.
