= Zographus quadrimaculatus =

Scientific classification
- Domain: Eukaryota
- Kingdom: Animalia
- Phylum: Arthropoda
- Class: Insecta
- Order: Coleoptera
- Suborder: Polyphaga
- Infraorder: Cucujiformia
- Family: Cerambycidae
- Genus: Zographus
- Species: Z. quadrimaculatus

Binomial name
- Zographus quadrimaculatus Gilmour, 1956

Species of beetle

Zographus quadrimaculatus is a species of beetle in the family Cerambycidae. It was described by E. Forrest Gilmour in 1956. It is known from Tanzania.
