= Mimotragocephala =

Scientific classification
- Kingdom: Animalia
- Phylum: Arthropoda
- Class: Insecta
- Order: Coleoptera
- Suborder: Polyphaga
- Infraorder: Cucujiformia
- Family: Cerambycidae
- Genus: Mimotragocephala
- Species: M. dujardini

Binomial name
- Mimotragocephala dujardini Breuning, 1971

Genus of beetles

Mimotragocephala dujardini is a species of beetle in the family Cerambycidae, and the only species in the genus Mimotragocephala. It was described by Stephan von Breuning in 1971.
