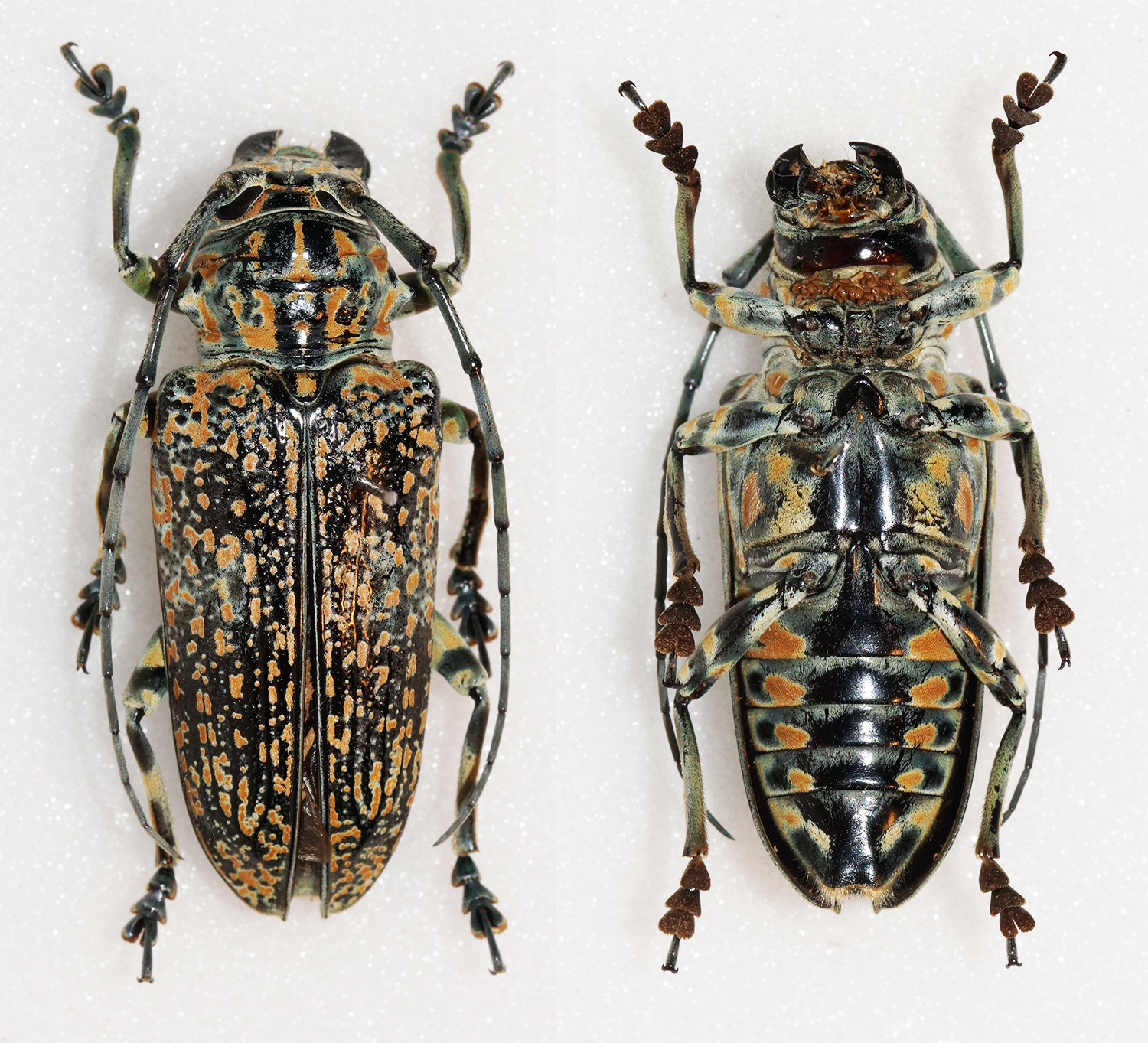

Scientific classification
- Kingdom: Animalia
- Phylum: Arthropoda
- Class: Insecta
- Order: Coleoptera
- Suborder: Polyphaga
- Infraorder: Cucujiformia
- Family: Cerambycidae
- Genus: Pterochaos
- Species: P. irroratus

Binomial name
- Pterochaos irroratus (Fabricius, 1793)

Synonyms
- List: Cerambyx nebulosus Voet, 1781 (Unav.); Lamia irrorata Fabricius, 1793; Lamia picta Leach, 1814; Pterochaos nebulosus (Voet, 1781)

= Pterochaos =

Species of beetle

Pterochaos irroratus is a species of beetle in the family Cerambycidae, and the only species in the genus Pterochaos.
