= Pseudoharpya =

Scientific classification
- Kingdom: Animalia
- Phylum: Arthropoda
- Class: Insecta
- Order: Coleoptera
- Suborder: Polyphaga
- Infraorder: Cucujiformia
- Family: Cerambycidae
- Genus: Pseudoharpya
- Species: P. opulenta

Binomial name
- Pseudoharpya opulenta (Harold, 1879)

Genus of beetles

Pseudoharpya opulenta is a species of beetle in the family Cerambycidae, and the only species in the genus Pseudoharpya. It was described by Harold in 1879.
