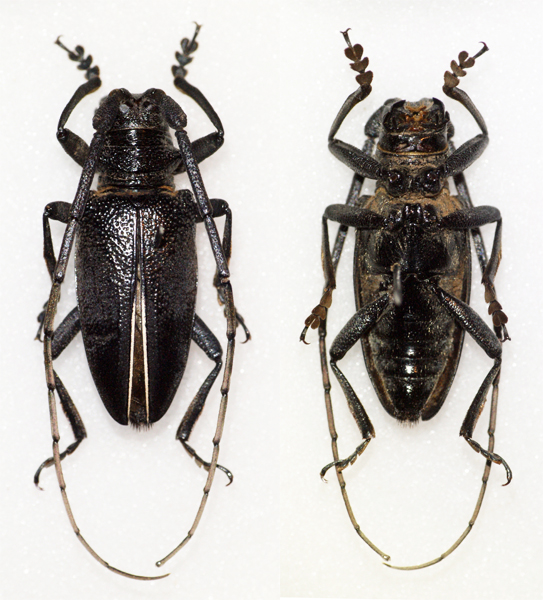

Scientific classification
- Kingdom: Animalia
- Phylum: Arthropoda
- Clade: Pancrustacea
- Class: Insecta
- Order: Coleoptera
- Suborder: Polyphaga
- Infraorder: Cucujiformia
- Family: Cerambycidae
- Genus: Demagogus
- Species: D. larvatus

Binomial name
- Demagogus larvatus Thomson, 1868

= Demagogus =

Genus of beetles

Demagogus larvatus is a species of beetle in the family Cerambycidae, and the only species in the genus Demagogus. It was described by Thomson in 1868, and is found in Kenya and Ethiopia.
