= Cylindrothorax =

Scientific classification
- Kingdom: Animalia
- Phylum: Arthropoda
- Class: Insecta
- Order: Coleoptera
- Suborder: Polyphaga
- Infraorder: Cucujiformia
- Family: Cerambycidae
- Genus: Cylindrothorax
- Species: C. balteatus

Binomial name
- Cylindrothorax balteatus (Heath, 1903)

Genus of beetles

Cylindrothorax balteatus is a species of beetle in the family Cerambycidae, and the only species in the genus Cylindrothorax. It was described by Heath in 1903.
