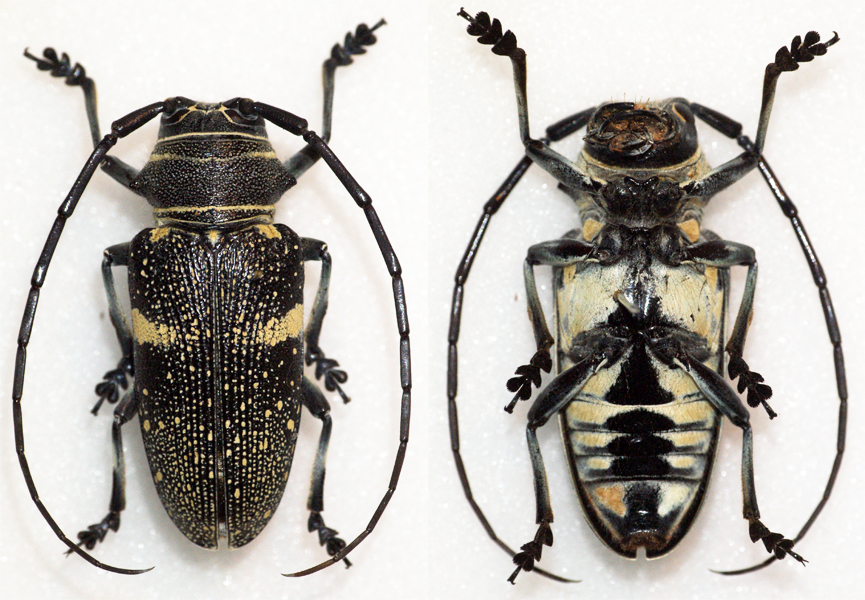

Scientific classification
- Domain: Eukaryota
- Kingdom: Animalia
- Phylum: Arthropoda
- Class: Insecta
- Order: Coleoptera
- Suborder: Polyphaga
- Infraorder: Cucujiformia
- Family: Cerambycidae
- Genus: Zographus
- Species: Z. aulicus

Binomial name
- Zographus aulicus Bertoloni, 1849

= Zographus aulicus =

Species of beetle

Zographus aulicus is a species of beetle in the family Cerambycidae. It was described by Bertoloni in 1849. It has a wide distribution in Africa.

== Varietas ==
- Zographus aulicus var. unicolor Breuning, 1935
- Zographus aulicus var. ferox Harold, 1878
