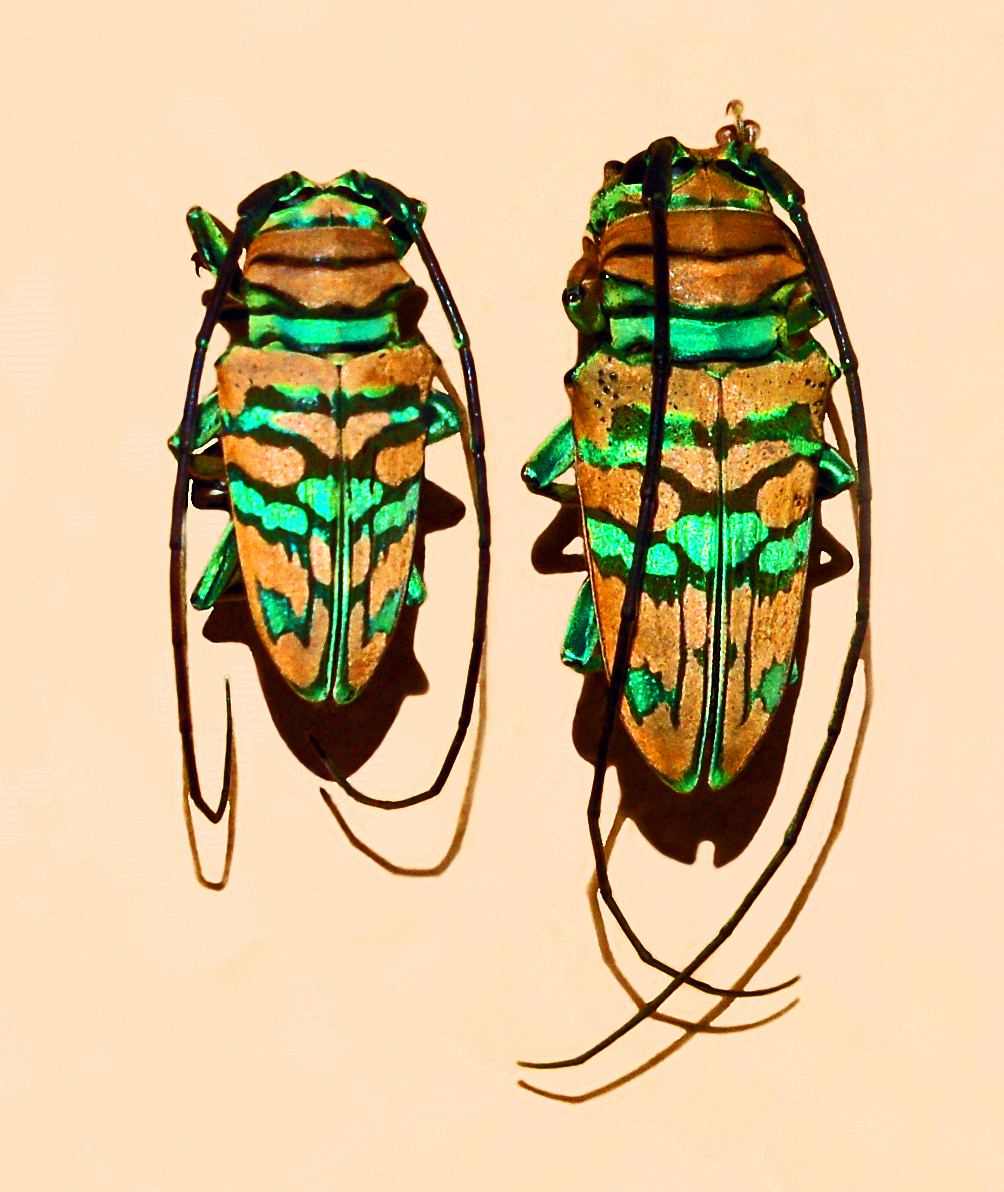
- Sternotomis pulchra var. obscura from Republic of the Congo. Male and female

Scientific classification
- Domain: Eukaryota
- Kingdom: Animalia
- Phylum: Arthropoda
- Class: Insecta
- Order: Coleoptera
- Suborder: Polyphaga
- Infraorder: Cucujiformia
- Family: Cerambycidae
- Tribe: Sternotomini
- Genus: Sternotomis; Percheron, 1836

Synonyms
- Ultiolemur Thomson, 1868; Pseudolemur Breuning, 1935

= Sternotomis =

Genus of beetles

Sternotomis is a genus of longhorn beetle (family Cerambycidae), native to Sub-Saharan Africa. They are typically conspicuously colored and 1.8–3.6 cm (0.7–1.4 in) long.

== List of species ==
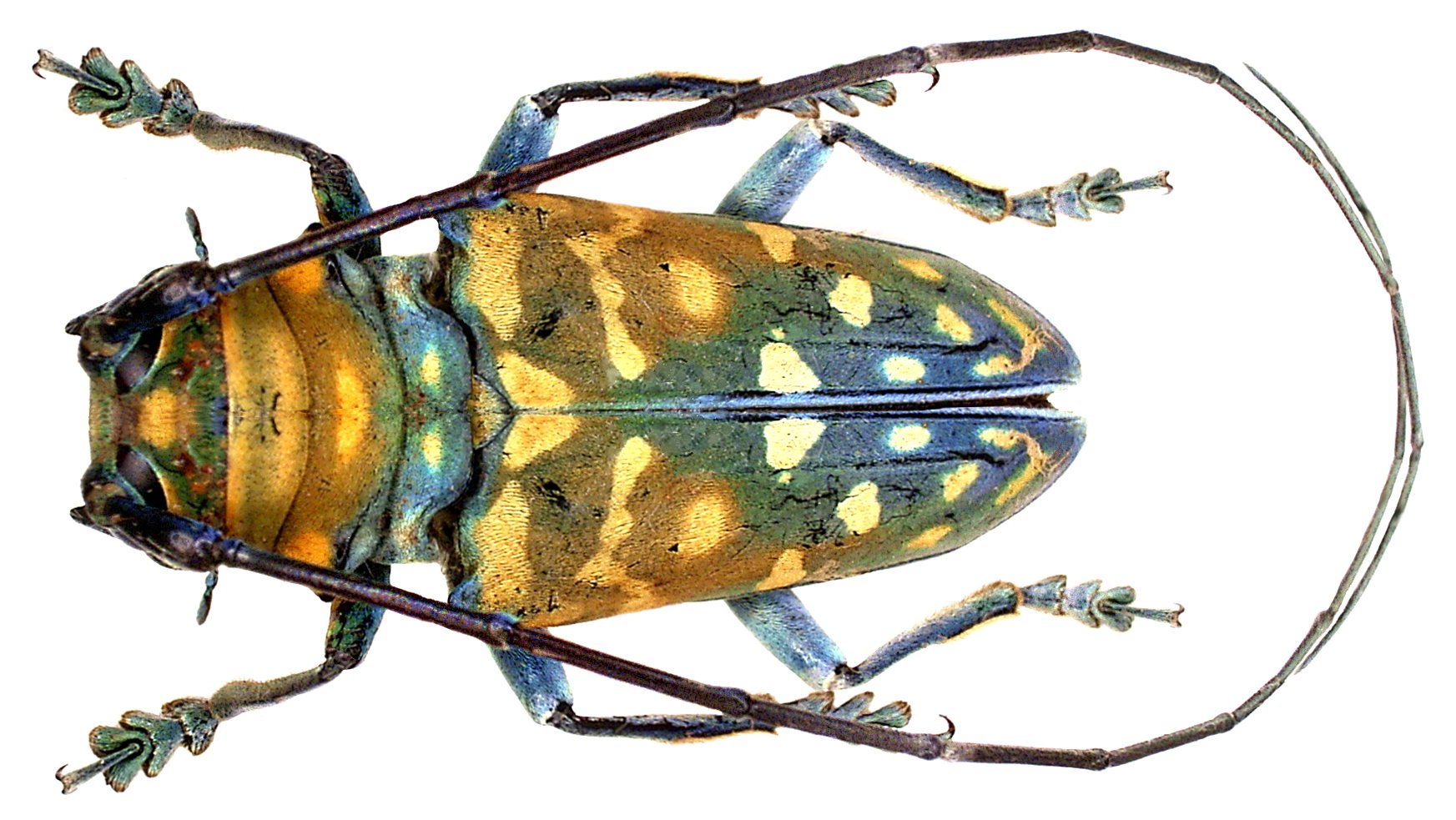
Sternotomis itzingeri

Sternotomis is divided into three subgenera, Pseudolemur, Sternotomis and Ultiolemur, and contains the following species:

- Sternotomis albomaculata (Breuning, 1938)
- Sternotomis alternans Breuning, 1959
- Sternotomis amabilis (Hope, 1843)
- Sternotomis andrewesi Breuning, 1935
- Sternotomis bohemani Chevrolat, 1844
- Sternotomis burgeoni Breuning, 1935
- Sternotomis caillaudi Chevrolat, 1844
- Sternotomis callais Fairmaire, 1891
- Sternotomis carbonaria Aurivillius, 1904
- Sternotomis centralis Hintz, 1911
- Sternotomis chrysopras (Schönherr, 1817)
- Sternotomis cornutor (Fabricius, 1775)
- Sternotomis ducalis (Klug, 1835)
- Sternotomis fairmairei Argod, 1899
- Sternotomis flavomaculata Hintz, 1919
- Sternotomis itzingeri Breuning, 1935
- Sternotomis jeanneli Breuning, 1935
- Sternotomis kuntzeni Fiedler, 1939
- Sternotomis lemoulti Breuning, 1935
- Sternotomis lequeuxi Allard, 1993
- Sternotomis levassori Fairmaire, 1894
- Sternotomis mathildae Allard, 1993
- Sternotomis mimica Breuning, 1935
- Sternotomis mirabilis (Drury, 1773)
- Sternotomis pulchra (Drury, 1773)
- Sternotomis pupieri Fleutiaux, 1905
- Sternotomis rousseti Allard, 1993
- Sternotomis rufozonata Fairmaire, 1902
- Sternotomis runsoriensis Gahan, 1909
- Sternotomis schoutedeni Breuning, 1935
- Sternotomis strandi Breuning, 1935
- Sternotomis thomsonii Buquet, 1855
- Sternotomis variabilis Quedenfeldt, 1881
- Sternotomis vasco Coquerel, 1861
- Sternotomis virescens (Westwood, 1845)
