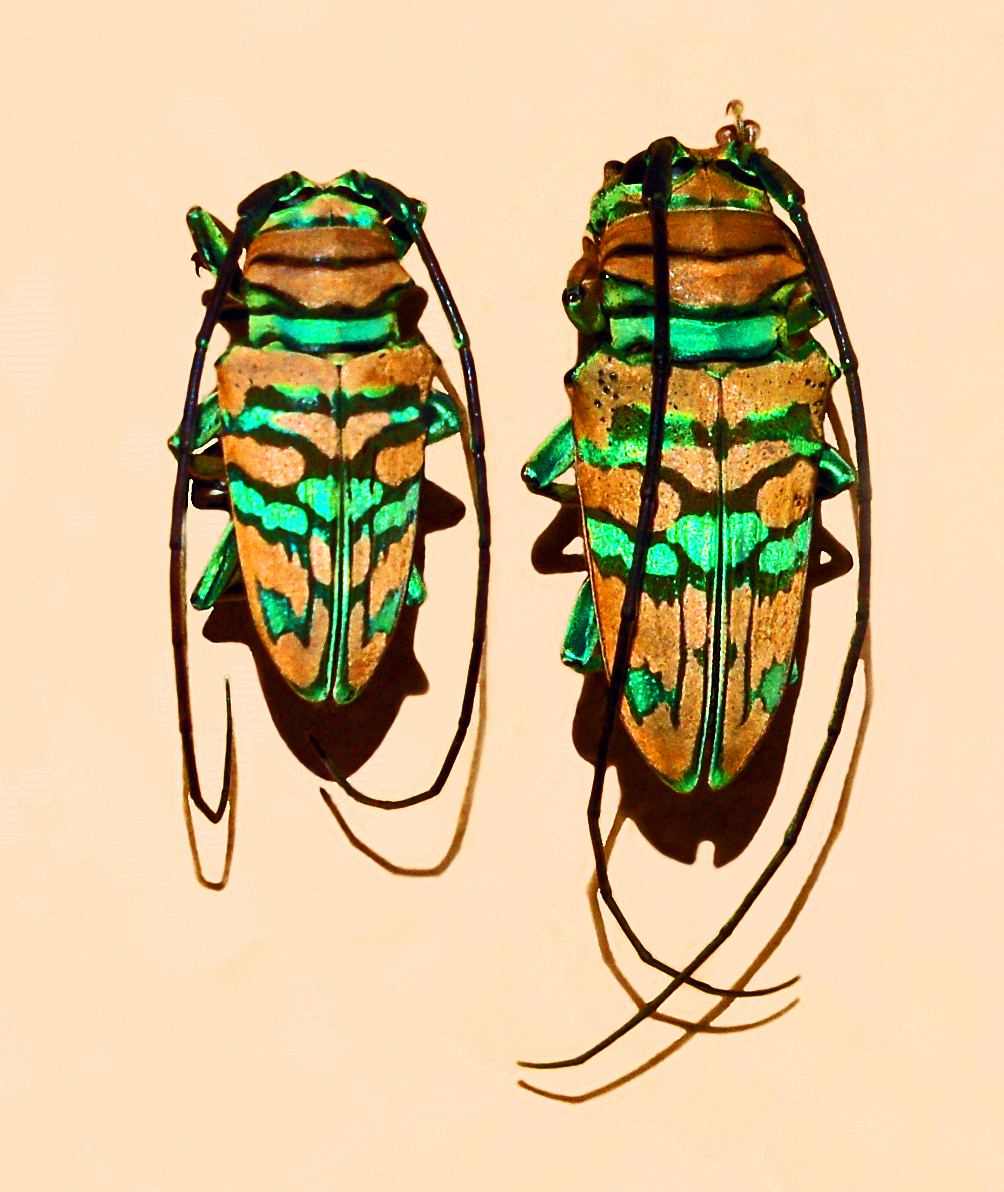
- Sternotomis pulchra var. obscura

Scientific classification
- Kingdom: Animalia
- Phylum: Arthropoda
- Class: Insecta
- Order: Coleoptera
- Suborder: Polyphaga
- Infraorder: Cucujiformia
- Family: Cerambycidae
- Subfamily: Lamiinae
- Tribe: Sternotomini; Thomson, 1860

= Sternotomini =

Tribe of beetles

Sternotomini is a tribe of longhorn beetles of the subfamily Lamiinae. It was described by Thomson in 1860.

== Taxonomy ==
- Anatragoides Breuning, 1938
- Cylindrothorax Aurivillius, 1915
- Demagogus Thomson, 1868
- Freadelpha Thomson, 1868
- Mimotragocephala Breuning, 1971
- Pinacosterna Harold, 1879
- Pseudoharpya Breuning, 1935
- Pterochaos Thomson, 1868
- Stellognatha Dejean, 1835
- Sternoharpya Aurivillius, 1913
- Sternotomis Percheron, 1836
- Zographus Dejean, 1835
