= Vincent Allard =

Belgian entomologist (1921–1994)

Vincent Allard (French pronunciation: [vɛ̃sɑ̃ alaʁ]; 18 December 1921 – 22 January 1994) was a Belgian entomologist.

Born at Braine l'Alleud, south Brussels, Vincent Allard received his medical studies in France where he obtained several degrees from the University of Paris and Institut Pasteur in 1947 and 1948. In 1949 he was in the United States where he studied fungal diseases at the Harvard Medical School. Then he lived in Zaïre where he developed laboratories and was professor of histology general until 1975.

He published several books and many works on Coleoptera. He had a very large collection of beetles, all accurately named.

== Books ==
- 1. The Beetles of the World, volume 6. Goliathini 2 (Cetoniidae), 1985, Sciences Nat, Venette
- 2. The Beetles of the World, volume 7. Goliathini 3 (Cetoniidae), 1986, Sciences Nat, Venette
- 3. The Beetles of the World, volume 11. Goliathini 4 (Cetoniidae), 1991, Sciences Nat, Venette
- 4. The Beetles of the World, volume 12. Cetoniini 2 (Cetoniidae), 1992 (with Jacques Rigout), Sciences Nat, Venette
- 5. The Beetles of the World, volume 17. Sternotomini (Cerambycidae), 1993, Sciences Nat, Venette
- 6. The Beetles of the World, volume 23. Schizorhinini 1 (Cetoniidae), 1995, Sciences Nat, Venette
- 7. The Beetles of the World, volume 24. Schizorhinini 2 (Cetoniidae), 1995, Sciences Nat, Venette
- 8. The Beetles of the World, volume 25. Schizorhinini 3 (Cetoniidae), 1997 (with Jacques Rigout), Hillside Books, Canterbury

== Works ==
Here is the complete list of his works:

- 1983 - Notes sur le genre Coelorrhina Burmeister (Cetoniidae), Bulletin de la Société Sciences Nat, 36, pp. 3–5, 1 col. plate.
- 1984 - Notes sur les genres Stephanorrhina Burmeister et Aphelorrhina Westwood (Cetoniidae), Bulletin de la Société Sciences Nat, 43, pp. 7–9, 2 col. plates.
- 1985 - Réhabilitation de Eudicella gralli pauperata Kolbe, bona species, (nec "trilineata" Quedf.) (Cetoniidae), Bulletin de la Société Sciences Nat, 46, p. 11.
- 1985 - Description d'une nouvelle sous-espèce de Amaurodes passerini Westwood (Cetoniidae), Bulletin de la Société Sciences Nat, 46, p. 16.
- 1985 - Description d'une espèce et d'une sous-espèce nouvelles du genre Stephanocrates Kolbe (Cetoniidae), Bulletin de la Société Sciences Nat, 46, pp. 16–17.
- 1985 - Description d'une nouvelle sous-espèce de Megalorrhina harrisi Westwood. (Cetoniidae), Bulletin de la Société Sciences Nat, 47, p. 1.
- 1985 - Description d'une nouvelle espèce du genre Eudicella White (Cetoniidae), Bulletin de la Société Sciences Nat, 47, p. 2.
- 1985 - Réflexions sur la classification des groupes gralli et smithi du genre Eudicella White (Cetoniidae), Bulletin de la Société Sciences Nat, 47, p. 27.
- 1986 - Description d'une nouvelle espèce du genre Ischnostoma G. & P. (Cetoniidae), Bulletin de la Société Sciences Nat, 51, p. 25.
- 1988 - Description d'e deux nouvelle espèces du genre Daedycorrhina Bates(Cetoniidae), Bulletin de la Société Sciences Nat, 58, p. 17.
- 1989 - Inventaire des cétoines de l'île de Bioko (ex-Fernando Po) avec description de races géographiques nouvelles (Cetoniidae), Bulletin de la Société Sciences Nat, 59, pp. 26– 28.
- 1989 - Description d'une nouvelle espèce de Gnathocera Kirby de la République populaire du Congo (Cetoniidae), Bulletin de la Société Sciences Nat, 60, p. 9.
- 1989 - Descriptions de trois nouvelles espèces du genre Melinesthes Kraatz, (Cetoniidae) Bulletin de la Société Sciences Nat, 60, pp. 12–13.
- 1989 - Descriptions de trois nouvelles espèces du genre Panglaphyra Kraatz, (Cetoniidae) Bulletin de la Société Sciences Nat, 61, pp. 1–3.
- 1990 - Description d'une nouvelle espèce du genre Megalorrhina Westwood (Cetoniidae), Bulletin de la Société Sciences Nat, 66, p. 20.
- 1990 - Diagnose d'un nouveau Rosenbergia Ritsema (Lamiinae), Bulletin de la Société Sciences Nat, 66, p. 20.
- 1990 - Description d'une nouvelle espèce du genre Stephanorrhina Burmeister (Cetoniidae), Bulletin de la Société Sciences Nat, 67, pp. 23–24.
- 1990 - Description d'une nouvelle espèce du genre Agestrata Eschscholtz (Cetoniidae), Bulletin de la Société Sciences Nat, 67, pp. 24–25.
- 1990 - Description d'une nouvelle cétoine de l'île du Prince (Cetoniidae), Bulletin de la Société Sciences Nat, 68, p. 22.
- 1990 - Formes pâles dans le genre Daedycorrhina Bates (Cetoniidae), Bulletin de la Société Sciences Nat, 68, p. 23.
- 1992 - Nouvelles cétoines africaines (Cetoniidae), Bulletin de la Société Sciences Nat, 74, p. 11.
- 1993 - Diagnoses de cétoines africaines (Cetoniidae), Bulletin de la Société Sciences Nat, 78, pp. 4–5.

== Entomological terms named after him ==
- Acridoschema allardi Téocchi, 1989
- Allardiana Rigout, 1994
- Analleucosma allardi Antoine, 1989
- Chondropyga allardi Rigout, 1997
- Digenethle allardi, Rigout 1997
- Glycyphana (Glycyphaniola) allardi Antoine, 1992
- Ischiopsopha laglaizei allardi Delpont, 1995
- Ixorida (Aurelia) allardi Antoine, 1994
- Ixorida (Mecinonota) regia allardi Antoine, 1989
- Lomaptera allardi Rigout, 1997
- Pachnoda allardi Rutter, 1969
- Pleuronota allardi Antoine, 1990
- Poecilopharis allardi Rigout, 1995
- Protaetia (Protaetia) allardi Antoine, 1994
- Pseudochalcotheomima allardi Antoine, 1990
- Rhabdotis allardi Antoine, Beinhundner & Legrand, 2003
- Sarathropezus conicipennis allardi Téocchi, 1989
- Triplognatha allardi Allard (nec Krikken), 1992

== List of the taxa described by Vincent Allard ==
- Allardiana antoinei Allard, 1995, The Beetles of the World, 23, p. 28
- Allardiana bacchusi Allard, 1995, The Beetles of the World, 23, p. 28
- Allardiana philippei Allard, 1995, The Beetles of the World, 23, p. 27
- Agestrata antoinei Allard, 1995, The Beetles of the World, 24, p. 10
- Agestrata arnaudi Allard, 1990, Bulletin de la Société Sciences Nat, 67 p. 24
- Amaurodes passerini dukei Allard, 1985, Bulletin de la Société Sciences Nat, 46 p. 16
- Amaurodes passerini natalensis Allard, 1992, Bulletin de la Société Sciences Nat, 74 p. 11
- Aphanochroa overlaeti collinsi Allard, 1985, The Beetles of the World, 6, p. 37
- Aphelorrhina bella insulanus Allard, 1989, Bulletin de la Société Sciences Nat, 59 p. 26
- Aphelorrhina neumanni bouyeri Allard, 1991, The Beetles of the World, 11, p. 18
- Aphelorrhina neumanni ruteri Allard, 1985, The Beetles of the World, 7, p. 26
- Aphelorrhina similima hecqi Allard, 1984, Bulletin de la Société Sciences Nat, 43 p. 8
- Aphelorrhina tibialis adelphoides Allard, 1984, Bulletin de la Société Sciences Nat, 43 p. 8
- Aphelorrhina tibialis collinsi Allard, 1984, Bulletin de la Société Sciences Nat, 43 p. 8
- Ceratorhina cupreosuturalis castanescens Allard, 1985, The Beetles of the World, 6, p. 23
- Ceratorhina cupreosuturalis cupreosuturalis cyano Allard, 1985, The Beetles of the World, 6, p. 23
- Chalcopharis coleopteresdumondei Allard, 1995, The Beetles of the World, 23, p. 21
- Chalcopharis lansbergei violacea Allard, 1995, The Beetles of the World, 23, p. 21
- Clithria bacchusi Allard, 1995, The Beetles of the World, 23, p. 29
- Coelorrhina babaulti Allard, 1983, Bulletin de la Société Sciences Nat, 36 p. 5
- Coelorrhina hornimanni quadripunctata Allard, 1985, The Beetles of the World, 6, p. 26
- Coelorrhina hornimanni lerui Allard, 1993, Bulletin de la Société Sciences Nat, 78 p. 4
- Coelorrhina hornimanni nathaliae Allard, 1989, Bulletin de la Société Sciences Nat, 59 p. 26
- Coelorrhina hornimanni reducta Allard, 1991, The Beetles of the World, 11, p. 13
- Coelorrhina hornimanni rougeoti Allard, 1991, The Beetles of the World, 11, p. 13
- Coelorrhina hornimanni vingerhoedti Allard, 1993, Bulletin de la Société Sciences Nat, 78 p. 5
- Coelorrhina loricata kiellandi Allard, 1985, The Beetles of the World, 6, p. 25
- Coelorrhina loricata montana Allard, 1985, The Beetles of the World, 6, p. 25
- Coelorrhina loricata ruandana Allard, 1983, Bulletin de la Société Sciences Nat, 36 p. 3
- Coelorrhina ruficeps collinsi Allard, 1983, Bulletin de la Société Sciences Nat, 36 p. 4
- Coelorrhina ruficeps elgonensis Allard, 1983, Bulletin de la Société Sciences Nat, 36 p. 4
- Coelorrhina ruteri Allard, 1983, Bulletin de la Société Sciences Nat, 36 p. 5
- Daedycorrhina bidenticornis Allard, 1985, The Beetles of the World, 6, p. 34
- Daedycorrhina brevicornis Allard, 1985, The Beetles of the World, 6, p. 35
- Daedycorrhina donckieri pallida Allard, 1990, Bulletin de la Société Sciences Nat, 68 p. 23
- Daedycorrhina iringana Allard, 1985, The Beetles of the World, 6, p. 36
- Daedycorrhina kiellandi Allard, 1985, The Beetles of the World, 6, p. 34
- Daedycorrhina rigouti Allard, 1985, The Beetles of the World, 6, p. 35
- Daedycorrhina rigouti flavipennis Allard, 1990, Bulletin de la Société Sciences Nat, 68 p. 23
- Daedycorrhina rigouti pallida Allard, 1991, The Beetles of the World, 11, p. 12
- Daedycorrhina rondoensis Allard, 1988, Bulletin de la Société Sciences Nat, 58 p. 17
- Daedycorrhina songeana Allard, 1988, Bulletin de la Société Sciences Nat, 58 p. 17
- Diaphonia antoinei Allard, 1995, The Beetles of the World, 23, p. 41
- Digenethle antoinei Allard, 1995, The Beetles of the World, 23, p. 52
- Digenethle clarki Allard, 1995, The Beetles of the World, 23, p. 51
- Digenethle costata Allard, 1995, The Beetles of the World, 23, p. 51
- Digenethle dechambrei Allard, 1995, The Beetles of the World, 23, p. 52
- Digenethle hudsoni Allard, 1995, The Beetles of the World, 23, p. 51
- Digenethle lachaumei Allard, 1995, The Beetles of the World, 23, p. 52
- Digenethle landfordi Allard, 1995, The Beetles of the World, 23, p. 52
- Digenethle nagaii Allard, 1995, The Beetles of the World, 23, p. 52
- Digenethle uhligi Allard, 1995, The Beetles of the World, 23, p. 51
- Dyspilophora trivittata insularis Allard, 1992, Bulletin de la Société Sciences Nat, 74 p. 11
- Dyspilophora trivittata shimbaensis Allard, 1991, The Beetles of the World, 11, p. 27
- Eudicella colmanti edohi Allard, 1991, The Beetles of the World, 11, p. 17
- Eudicella euthalia collinsi Allard, 1985, The Beetles of the World, 6, p. 20
- Eudicella euthalia faessleri Allard, 1991, The Beetles of the World, 11, p. 15
- Eudicella euthalia natalensis Allard, 1985, The Beetles of the World, 6, p. 20
- Eudicella euthalia oweni Allard, 1985, The Beetles of the World, 6, p. 20
- Eudicella euthalia resseleri Allard, 1991, The Beetles of the World, 11, p. 15
- Eudicella euthalia rungwensis Allard, 1991, The Beetles of the World, 11, p. 15
- Eudicella gralli allaeri Allard, 1985, The Beetles of the World, 6, p. 18
- Eudicella gralli aureovittata Allard, 1991, The Beetles of the World, 11, p. 16
- Eudicella gralli elgonensis Allard, 1985, The Beetles of the World, 6, p. 18
- Eudicella gralli hecqi Allard, 1985, The Beetles of the World, 6, p. 19
- Eudicella gralli hubini Allard, 1991, The Beetles of the World, 11, p. 16
- Eudicella gralli imatongensis Allard, 1985, The Beetles of the World, 6, p. 19
- Eudicella gralli iturina Allard, 1985, The Beetles of the World, 6, p. 18
- Eudicella gralli orientalis Allard, 1985, The Beetles of the World, 6, p. 18
- Eudicella gralli thiryi Allard, 1993, Bulletin de la Société Sciences Nat, 78 p. 5
- Eudicella gralli umbrovittata Allard, 1985, The Beetles of the World, 6, p. 19
- Eudicella immaculata quadrimaculata Allard, 1993, Bulletin de la Société Sciences Nat, 78 p. 4
- Eudicella intermedia Allard, 1985, Bulletin de la Société Sciences Nat, 47 p. 2
- Eudicella intermedia challemeli Allard, 1985, The Beetles of the World, 6, p. 16
- Eudicella morgani camerounensis Allard, 1991, The Beetles of the World, 11, p. 17
- Eudicella morgani togolensis Allard, 1991, The Beetles of the World, 11, p. 17
- Eudicella nyassica manowensis Allard, 1991, The Beetles of the World, 11, p. 14
- Eudicella schultzeorum opdebeeki Allard, 1991, The Beetles of the World, 11, p. 16
- Eudicella schultzeorum pseudowoermanni Allard, 1991, The Beetles of the World, 11, p. 16
- Eudicella smithi alberti Allard, 1991, The Beetles of the World, 11, p. 15
- Eudicella smithi dewildei Allard, 1985, The Beetles of the World, 6, p. 19
- Eudicella smithi itzingeri Allard, 1991, The Beetles of the World, 11, p. 15
- Eudicella smithi juheli Allard, 1991, The Beetles of the World, 11, p. 15
- Eudicella smithi lequeuxi Allard, 1991, The Beetles of the World, 11, p. 15
- Eudicella smithi maragoliensis Allard, 1991, The Beetles of the World, 11, p. 15
- Eudicella smithi mpwapwana Allard, 1991, The Beetles of the World, 11, p. 16
- Eudicella smithi virungaensis Allard, 1991, The Beetles of the World, 11, p. 15
- Eudicella smithi newtonae Allard, 1985, The Beetles of the World, 6, p. 19
- Eudicella smithi watulegei Allard, 1985, The Beetles of the World, 6, p. 19
- Eudicella tetraspilota devautouri Allard, 1991, The Beetles of the World, 11, p. 14
- Eudicella tetraspilota onorei Allard, 1991, The Beetles of the World, 11, p. 14
- Eudicella woermanni iturina Allard, 1985, The Beetles of the World, 6, p. 17
- Eudicella woermanni mechowiana Allard, 1985, The Beetles of the World, 6, p. 17
- Eudicella woermanni nathaliae Allard, 1989, Bulletin de la Société Sciences Nat, 59 p. 26
- Eudicella woermanni ugandensis Allard, 1985, The Beetles of the World, 6, p. 17
- Geloharpya schmitti Allard, 1993, The Beetles of the World, 17, p. 21
- Genyodonta laeviplaga insularis Allard, 1992, Bulletin de la Société Sciences Nat, 74 p. 11
- Genyodonta laeviplaga perflavoapicalis Allard, 1992, Bulletin de la Société Sciences Nat, 74 p. 11
- Genyodonta lequeuxi Allard, 1985, The Beetles of the World, 7, p. 29
- Genyodonta lequeuxi insulana Allard, 1993, Bulletin de la Société Sciences Nat, 78 p. 5
- Genyodonta palliata collinsi Allard, 1993, Bulletin de la Société Sciences Nat, 78 p. 5
- Genyodonta palliata werneri Allard, 1993, Bulletin de la Société Sciences Nat, 78 p. 4
- Gnathocera bilineata valeriae Allard, 1991, The Beetles of the World, 11, p. 56
- Gnathocera lurida kiellandi Allard, 1991, The Beetles of the World, 11, p. 58
- Gnathocera pauliani Allard, 1989, Bulletin de la Société Sciences Nat, 60 p. 9
- Gnathocera trivittata wittei Allard, 1991, The Beetles of the World, 11, p. 53
- Ischipsopha antoinei Allard, 1995, The Beetles of the World, 24, p. 28
- Ischipsopha blancbonnet Allard, 1995, The Beetles of the World, 24, p. 31
- Ischipsopha bonnetblanc Allard, 1995, The Beetles of the World, 24, p. 31
- Ischipsopha castaneipennis asekiensis Allard, 1995, The Beetles of the World, 24, p. 42
- Ischipsopha castaneipennis daruensis Allard, 1995, The Beetles of the World, 24, p. 42
- Ischipsopha castaneipennis equilateralis Allard, 1995, The Beetles of the World, 24, p. 42
- Ischipsopha castaneipennis nigrorubra Allard, 1995, The Beetles of the World, 24, p. 42
- Ischipsopha clarki Allard, 1995, The Beetles of the World, 24, p. 38
- Ischipsopha dechambrei Allard, 1995, The Beetles of the World, 24, p. 27
- Ischipsopha delponti Allard, 1995, The Beetles of the World, 24, p. 27
- Ischipsopha hudsoni Allard, 1995, The Beetles of the World, 24, p. 37
- Ischipsopha jansoni nigroabdominalis Allard, 1995, The Beetles of the World, 24, p. 42
- Ischipsopha kerleyi Allard, 1995, The Beetles of the World, 24, p. 34
- Ischipsopha kuehbandneri Allard, 1995, The Beetles of the World, 24, p. 39
- Ischipsopha landfordi Allard, 1995, The Beetles of the World, 24, p. 40
- Ischipsopha menieri Allard, 1995, The Beetles of the World, 24, p. 43
- Ischipsopha minettii Allard, 1995, The Beetles of the World, 24, p. 27
- Ischipsopha poggi Allard, 1995, The Beetles of the World, 24, p. 26
- Ischipsopha ritsemae celebensis Allard, 1995, The Beetles of the World, 24, p. 31
- Ischipsopha ruteri Allard, 1995, The Beetles of the World, 24, p. 33
- Ischipsopha uhligi Allard, 1995, The Beetles of the World, 24, p. 33
- Ischipsopha willemsteini Allard, 1995, The Beetles of the World, 24, p. 36
- Ischipsopha willemsteini kainantuensis Allard, 1995, The Beetles of the World, 24, p. 37
- Ischnostoma coetzeri Allard, 1986, Bulletin de la Société Sciences Nat, 51 p. 25
- Lomaptera funebris valcklucasseni Allard, 1997, The Beetles of the World, 25, p. 93
- Lomaptera mutabilis umboiensis Allard, 1997, The Beetles of the World, 25, p. 70
- Lomaptera pygmaea tartempionibusi Allard, 1997, The Beetles of the World, 25, p. 108
- Megaloharpya Allard, 1993, The Beetles of the World, 17, p. 24
- Megaloharpya lequeuxi Allard, 1993, The Beetles of the World, 17, p. 24
- Megalorrhina harrisi eximioides Allard, 1989, Bulletin de la Société Sciences Nat, 59 p. 26
- Megalorrhina harrisi leptofurcosa Allard, 1985, Bulletin de la Société Sciences Nat, 47 p. 1
- Megalorrhina taverniersi Allard, 1990, Bulletin de la Société Sciences Nat, 66 p. 21
- Melinesthes jocquei Allard, 1989, Bulletin de la Société Sciences Nat, 60 p. 12
- Melinesthes lequeuxi Allard, 1989, Bulletin de la Société Sciences Nat, 60 p. 12
- Melinesthes murphyi Allard, 1989, Bulletin de la Société Sciences Nat, 60 p. 12
- Melinesthes simillima melanaria Allard, 1991, The Beetles of the World, 11, p. 21
- Microlomaptera antoinei Allard, 1995, The Beetles of the World, 24, p. 44
- Microlomaptera clarki Allard, 1995, The Beetles of the World, 24, p. 44
- Microlomaptera hudsoni Allard, 1995, The Beetles of the World, 24, p. 44
- Morokia antoinei Allard, 1995, The Beetles of the World, 24, p. 21
- Mycterophallus dichropus diaphana Allard, 1995, The Beetles of the World, 24, p. 23
- Neptunides polychrous brunneipennis Allard, 1991, The Beetles of the World, 11, p. 13
- Neptunides polychrous dedzaensis Allard, 1991, The Beetles of the World, 11, p. 13
- Neptunides polychrous flavescens Allard, 1991, The Beetles of the World, 11, p. 13
- Neptunides polychrous fuscipennis Allard, 1985, The Beetles of the World, 6, p. 29
- Neptunides polychrous fuscipennis oweni Allard, 1985, The Beetles of the World, 6, p. 29
- Neptunides polychrous manowensis Allard, 1985, The Beetles of the World, 6, p. 29
- Neptunides polychrous polychrous ignita Allard, 1985, The Beetles of the World, 6, p. 29
- Neptunides polychrous polychrous lineatocollis Allard, 1985, The Beetles of the World, 6, p. 29
- Neptunides polychrous polychrous marginipennis Allard, 1985, The Beetles of the World, 6, p. 29
- Neptunides polychrous polychrous purpurascens Allard, 1985, The Beetles of the World, 6, p. 28
- Neptunides polychrous rubescens Allard, 1991, The Beetles of the World, 11, p. 13
- Neptunides stanleyi camerunensis Allard, 1985, The Beetles of the World, 6, p. 28
- Neptunides stanleyi elgonensis Allard, 1985, The Beetles of the World, 6, p. 28
- Neptunides stanleyi meridionalis Allard, 1985, The Beetles of the World, 6, p. 28
- Neptunides stanleyi stanleyi aurata Allard, 1985, The Beetles of the World, 6, p. 28
- Panglaphyra bougainvillei Allard, 1989, Bulletin de la Société Sciences Nat, 61 p. 3
- Panglaphyra ghanonggaensis Allard, 1995, The Beetles of the World, 23, p. 20
- Panglaphyra lamondi Allard, 1989, Bulletin de la Société Sciences Nat, 61 p. 3
- Panglaphyra pseudomarginicollis Allard, 1995, The Beetles of the World, 23, p. 20
- Panglaphyra robusta Allard, 1989, Bulletin de la Société Sciences Nat, 61 p. 3
- Pedinorrhina viridollis viridans Allard, 1991, The Beetles of the World, 11, p. 25
- Pinacosterna nachtigali maculata Allard, 1993, The Beetles of the World, 17, p. 12
- Pinacosterna weymanni bandundu Allard, 1993, The Beetles of the World, 17, p. 12
- Plaesiorrhina cinctuta kerionis Allard, 1991, The Beetles of the World, 11, p. 24
- Plaesiorrhina cinctuta molleti Allard, 1991, The Beetles of the World, 11, p. 23
- Plaesiorrhina plana cincta Allard, 1991, The Beetles of the World, 11, p. 23
- Plaesiorrhina plana cinctoides Allard, 1991, The Beetles of the World, 11, p. 23
- Plaesiorrhina watkinsiana kolbeii Allard, 1993, Bulletin de la Société Sciences Nat, 78 p. 4
- Poecilopharis antoinei Allard, 1995, The Beetles of the World, 23, p. 16
- Poecilopharis dechambrei Allard, 1995, The Beetles of the World, 23, p. 17
- Poecilopharis kerleyi Allard, 1995, The Beetles of the World, 23, p. 16
- Poecilopharis lachaumei Allard, 1995, The Beetles of the World, 23, p. 17
- Poecilopharis morrisi Allard, 1995, The Beetles of the World, 23, p. 18
- Poecilopharis poggii Allard, 1995, The Beetles of the World, 23, p. 15
- Poecilopharis porioni Allard, 1995, The Beetles of the World, 23, p. 16
- Poecilopharis ruteri Allard, 1995, The Beetles of the World, 23, p. 15
- Poecilopharis schochi buloloensis Allard, 1995, The Beetles of the World, 23, p. 18
- Poecilopharis schochi lufaensis Allard, 1995, The Beetles of the World, 23, p. 18
- Poecilophila maculatissima insularis Allard, 1992, The Beetles of the World, 12, p. 33
- Porphyronota congoensis Allard, 1992, The Beetles of the World, 12, p. 34
- Pseudinca camerunensis Allard, 1992, The Beetles of the World, 12, p. 43
- Pseudoheterophana Allard, 1990, Bulletin de la Société Sciences Nat, 68 p. 22
- Pseudoheterophana canui Allard, 1990, Bulletin de la Société Sciences Nat, 68 p. 22
- Rhabdotis arabica Allard, 1992, The Beetles of the World, 12, p. 17
- Rhabdotis aulica impunctata Allard, 1992, The Beetles of the World, 12, p. 15
- Rhabdotis aulica perpunctata Allard, 1992, The Beetles of the World, 12, p. 15
- Rhabdotis intermedia grandioris Allard, 1992, The Beetles of the World, 12, p. 15
- Rhabdotis kordofana Allard, 1992, The Beetles of the World, 12, p. 17
- Rhabdotis sobrina aethiopica Allard, 1992, The Beetles of the World, 12, p. 16
- Smaragdesthes afrivana massaica Allard, 1991, The Beetles of the World, 11, p. 35
- Smaragdesthes afrivana opalina Allard, 1991, The Beetles of the World, 11, p. 35
- Smaragdesthes afrivana pembana Allard, 1991, The Beetles of the World, 11, p. 35
- Smaragdesthes afrivana sodwana Allard, 1991, The Beetles of the World, 11, p. 35
- Smaragdesthes conjux bousqueti Allard, 1991, The Beetles of the World, 11, p. 34
- Smaragdesthes conjux cedrici Allard, 1989, Bulletin de la Société Sciences Nat, 59 p. 27
- Smaragdesthes conjux imatongensis Allard, 1991, The Beetles of the World, 11, p. 34
- Smaragdesthes conjux violacea Allard, 1991, The Beetles of the World, 11, p. 34
- Stephanocrates dohertyi namangensis Allard, 1985, Bulletin de la Société Sciences Nat, 46 p. 17
- Stephanocrates kiellandi Allard, 1985, Bulletin de la Société Sciences Nat, 46 p. 16
- Stephanorrhina guttata insularis Allard, 1989, Bulletin de la Société Sciences Nat, 59 p. 26
- Stephanorrhina guttata meridionalis Allard, 1991, The Beetles of the World, 11, p. 18
- Stephanorrhina guttata uelensis Allard, 1991, The Beetles of the World, 11, p. 18
- Stephanorrhina isabellae Allard, 1990, Bulletin de la Société Sciences Nat, 67 p. 23
- Stephanorrhina princeps bamptoni Allard, 1984, Bulletin de la Société Sciences Nat, 43 p. 7
- Stephanorrhina princeps kigonsera Allard, 1984, Bulletin de la Société Sciences Nat, 43 p. 7
- Sternotomiella chaerila holoviridis Allard, 1993, The Beetles of the World, 17, p. 11
- Sternotomiella fulvosignata obliquemaculata Allard, 1993, The Beetles of the World, 17, p. 10
- Sternotomiella fulvosignata unimaculata Allard, 1993, The Beetles of the World, 17, p. 10
- Sternotomis bohemani dichrous Allard, 1993, The Beetles of the World, 17, p. 34
- Sternotomis bohemani kenyensis Allard, 1993, The Beetles of the World, 17, p. 34
- Sternotomis bohemani molleti Allard, 1993, The Beetles of the World, 17, p. 34
- Sternotomis bohemani pulcherrima Allard, 1993, The Beetles of the World, 17, p. 34
- Sternotomis bohemani usambarensis Allard, 1993, The Beetles of the World, 17, p. 34
- Sternotomis carbonaria perflava Allard, 1993, The Beetles of the World, 17, p. 35
- Sternotomis itzingeri katangensis Allard, 1993, The Beetles of the World, 17, p. 31
- Sternotomis itzingeri kivuensis Allard, 1993, The Beetles of the World, 17, p. 31
- Sternotomis lequeuxi Allard, 1993, The Beetles of the World, 17, p. 32
- Sternotomis mathildae Allard, 1993, The Beetles of the World, 17, p. 32
- Sternotomis pulchra griseocyanea Allard, 1993, The Beetles of the World, 17, p. 26
- Sternotomis pulchra imatongensis Allard, 1993, The Beetles of the World, 17, p. 25
- Sternotomis pulchra picta Allard, 1993, The Beetles of the World, 17, p. 25
- Sternotomis pulchra polychrous Allard, 1993, The Beetles of the World, 17, p. 25
- Sternotomis pulchra tshuapana Allard, 1993, The Beetles of the World, 17, p. 26
- Sternotomis rousseti Allard, 1993, The Beetles of the World, 17, p. 27
- Sternotomis runsoriensis dohertyi Allard, 1993, The Beetles of the World, 17, p. 35
- Sternotomis variabilis rufocyanea Allard, 1993, The Beetles of the World, 17, p. 30
- Tafaia antoinei Allard, 1995, The Beetles of the World, 23, p. 54
- Tafaia clarki Allard, 1995, The Beetles of the World, 23, p. 54
- Tafaia landfordi Allard, 1995, The Beetles of the World, 23, p. 54
- Taeniesthes collinsi Allard, 1992, Bulletin de la Société Sciences Nat, 74 p. 11
- Thaumastopeus antoinei Allard, 1995, The Beetles of the World, 24, p. 16
- Thaumastopeus miksici Allard, 1995, The Beetles of the World, 24, p. 17
- Thaumastopeus pugnator arrowi Allard, 1995, The Beetles of the World, 24, p. 13
- Thaumastopeus striatus krikkeni Allard, 1995, The Beetles of the World, 24, p. 13
- Tmesorrhina garnieri Allard, 1993, Bulletin de la Société Sciences Nat, 78 p. 4
- Tmesorrhina laeta burgeoni Allard, 1991, The Beetles of the World, 11, p. 37
- Tmesorrhina laeta pilosipes Allard, 1991, The Beetles of the World, 11, p. 37
- Tmesorrhina laeta pseudotridens Allard, 1993, Bulletin de la Société Sciences Nat, 78 p. 4
- Tmesorrhina latea oilosipes Allard, 1989, Bulletin de la Société Sciences Nat, 59 p. 27
- Tmesorrhina runsorica rubripes Allard, 1991, The Beetles of the World, 11, p. 38
- Tmesorrhina simillima viridipes Allard, 1989, Bulletin de la Société Sciences Nat, 59 p. 27
- Trichosteta alutacea Allard, 1992, The Beetles of the World, 12, p. 20
- Trichostetha capensis oweni Allard, 1992, The Beetles of the World, 12, p. 19
- Trichosteta fascicularis nigripennis Allard, 1992, The Beetles of the World, 12, p. 18
- Triplognatha allardi Allard (nec Krikken), 1992, The Beetles of the World, 12, p. 30
- Zographus regalis centralis Allard, 1993, The Beetles of the World, 17, p. 17

== Names revised ==
- Gnathocera cruda machadoi Allard, 1991 is designed as a subspecies incertae sedis, decision by (Ph.) Antoine in 2002, Coléoptères, 8(4)
- Neptunides polychrous dedzaenensis Allard, 1991 is designed as bona species as Taurhina (Neptunides) dedzaenensis, decision by (Ph.) Antoine and (R.) Minetti in 2005, Coléoptères, 11(10)
- Neptunides polychrous fuscipennis Allard, 1985 is designed as a subspecies of manowensis as Taurhina (Neptunides) manowensis fuscipennis, decision by (Ph.) Antoine and (R.) Minetti in 2005, Coléoptères, 11(10)
- Rhabdotis arabica Allard, 1992 is a synonym of Rhabdotis picta (Fabricius, 1775), decision by Antoine (Ph.), Beinhundner (G.) & Legrand (J.-Ph.) in 2003, Coléoptères, 9(22)
- Tmesorrhina latea pilosipes Allard, 1992 is designed as bona species: Tmesorrhina pilosipes, decision by (Ph.) Antoine in 2002, Coléoptères, 8(4)
- Tmesorrhina chaminadei Allard, 1992 is designed as a subspecies: Tmesorrhina pilosipes chaminadei, decision by (Ph.) Antoine in 2002, Coléoptères, 8(4)
