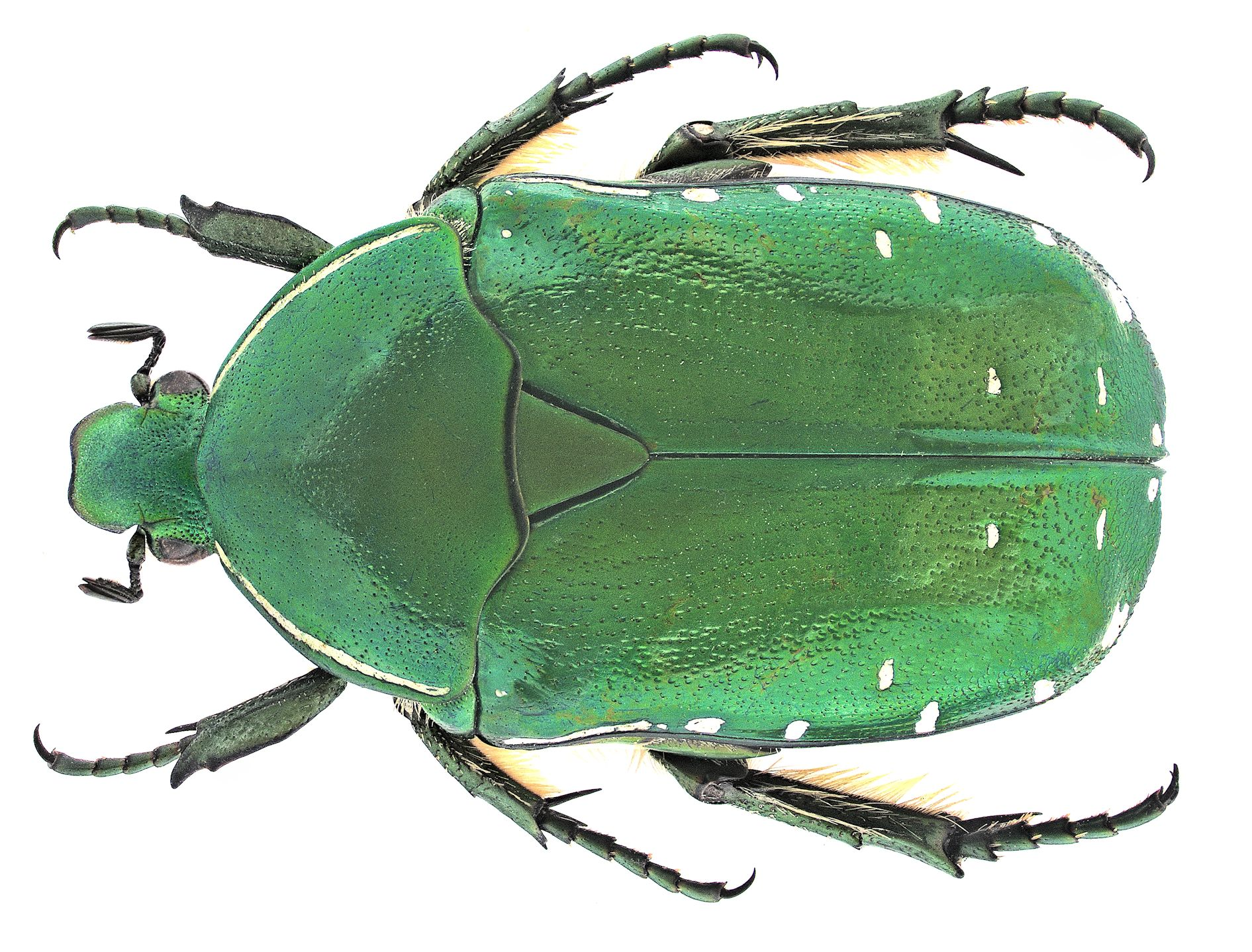
- Rhabdotis aulica

Scientific classification
- Kingdom: Animalia
- Phylum: Arthropoda
- Class: Insecta
- Order: Coleoptera
- Suborder: Polyphaga
- Infraorder: Scarabaeiformia
- Family: Scarabaeidae
- Subfamily: Cetoniinae
- Genus: Rhabdotis; Burmeister, 1842

Type species
- Rhabdotis picta Fabricius, 1775

= Rhabdotis =

Genus of beetles

Rhabdotis is a genus of flower chafers in the beetle family Scarabaeidae. (Note: Some sources assign the taxonomic rank of family to the flower chafers, in which case Rhabdotis is classified as a genus of the family Cetoniidae.)

It differs from Pachnoda by having the anterior edge of the clypeus tucked in and bilobed, a more elongated and oblique mesosternal projection, and a shiny green elytra punctate, striated and decorated with white dots and dashes.

== List of the described species and subspecies ==
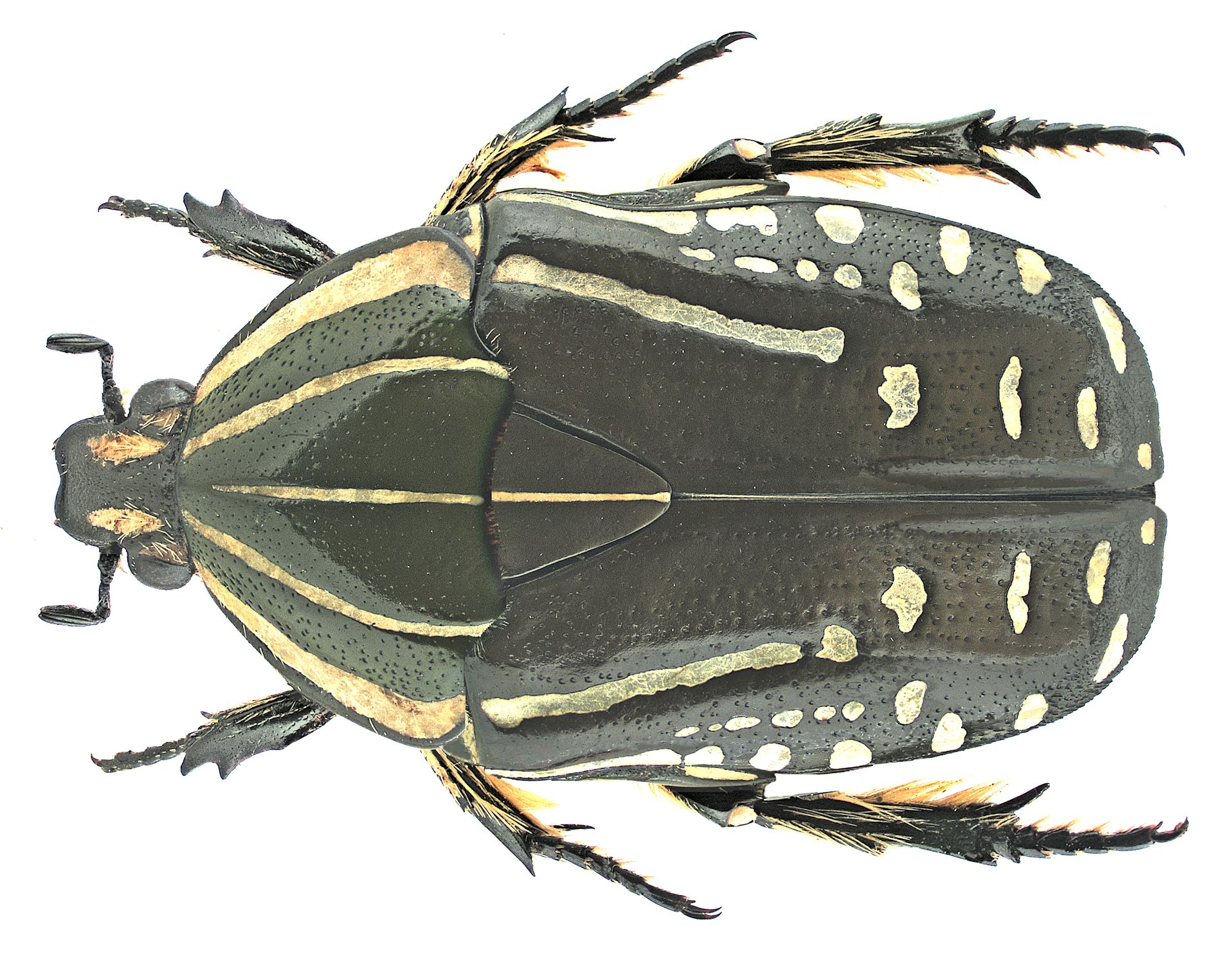
Rhabdotis sobrina virginea

- Rhabdotis albinigra Burmeister, 1847
- Rhabdotis allardi Antoine, Beinhundner & Legrand, 2003
- Rhabdotis bouchardi Legrand, 1996
- Rhabdotis aulica (Fabricius, 1791)
  - Rhabdotis aulica impunctata Allard, 1992
  - Rhabdotis aulica perpunctata Allard, 1992
- Rhabdotis dargei Antoine, 2006
- Rhabdotis dechambrei Antoine, Beinhundner & Legrand, 2003
- Rhabdotis fortii Antoine, Beinhundner & Legrand, 2003
- Rhabdotis gemella Legrand, 1996
- Rhabdotis giannatelli Antoine, Beinhundner & Legrand, 2003
- Rhabdotis intermedia Burmeister, 1847
  - Rhabdotis intermedia grandioris Allard, 1992
- Rhabdotis kordofana Allard, 1992
- Rhabdotis mirei Antoine, Beinhundner & Legrand, 2003
- Rhabdotis perdrix (Harold, 1879)
- Rhabdotis picta (Fabricius, 1775)
- Rhabdotis pontyi Vuilet, 1911
- Rhabdotis semipunctata (Fabricius, 1787)
- Rhabdotis sobrina (Gory & Percheron, 1833)
  - Rhabdotis sobrina aethiopica Allard, 1992
- Rhabdotis ugandensis Antoine, Beinhundner & Legrand, 2003

== Bibliography ==
- 1. Allard (V.), The Beetles of the World, volume 12. Cetoniini 2 (Cetoniidae), 1992, Sciences Nat, Venette.
- 2. Antoine (Ph.) - 2006, Un nouveau Rhabdotis Burmeister, 1842 du Cameroun, Coléoptères, 12(15), pp. 215–216.
- 3. Antoine (Ph.), Beinhundner (G.) & Legrand (J.-Ph.) - 2003, Contribution à la connaissance du genre Rhabdotis Burmeister : le groupe de Rhabdotis picta (F.), Coléoptères, 9(22), pp. 315–346.
- 4. Legrand (J.-Ph.) - 1996, Deux nouvelles espèces du genre Rhabdotis (Burmeister), Coléoptères, 2(11), pp. 123–126.
