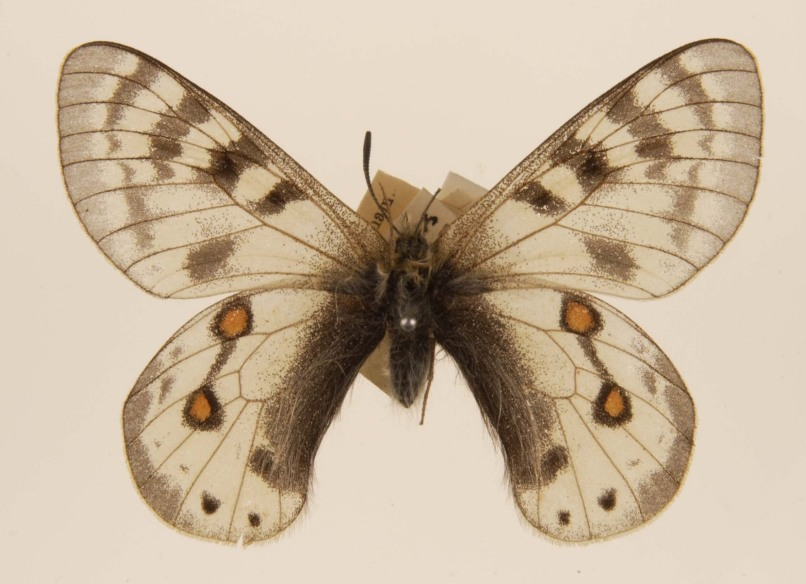

Scientific classification
- Kingdom: Animalia
- Phylum: Arthropoda
- Class: Insecta
- Order: Lepidoptera
- Family: Papilionidae
- Genus: Parnassius
- Species: P. staudingeri
- Subspecies: P. s. hunza

Trinomial name
- Parnassius staudingeri hunza Grum-Grshimailo, 1888

= Parnassius staudingeri hunza =

Karakoram banded Apollo

Subspecies of butterfly

Parnassius staudingeri hunza, the Karakoram banded Apollo, is a high-altitude butterfly which is found in India. It is a member of the genus Parnassius of the swallowtail family, Papilionidae. It was variously treated as a subspecies of P. delphius and a distinct species. The subspecies was first described by Grigory Grum-Grshimailo in 1888.

== Description ==
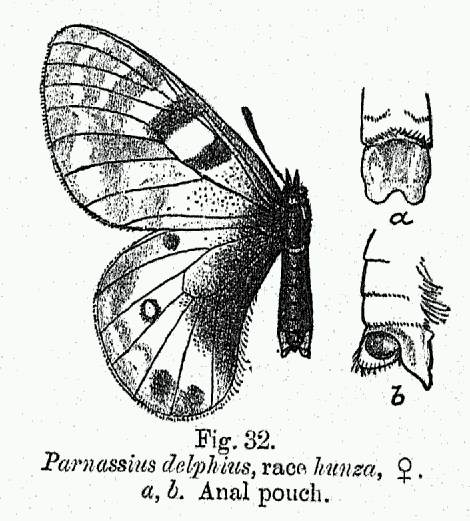

Male upperside ground colour duller, more sullied white. Forewing: the discal band in typical specimens very much shorter, not extended below vein 5, but in all specimens observed, the discal band reaches vein 1, and where it crosses interspace 3 is joined onto the postdiscal transverse band by a broad cross-bar, that extends right up to the base of that interspace. Hindwing: the sub-terminal series of dark spots reduced to one or two near the tornus, the anterior spots (except the spot in interspace 7) replaced by a curved band of somewhat luuulur spots that extends unbroken between the spot in interspace 3 and that in interspace 7. Underside: similar to the underside in Parnassius stoliczkanus, with no red spots at the base of the hindwing; in a few specimens a discal and a subcostal black-encircled red spot are present. Antennae, head, thorax and abdomen as in stoliczkanus.

== Range ==
It is seen in Afghanistan, Pakistan, northern India (including Jammu and Kashmir, Himachal Pradesh and Uttarakhand), western China (?), Tibet (?).

== Status ==
It is widely distributed. Locally common, generally rare. Not known to be threatened. Requires further research. This butterfly is protected by law in India and was featured in the erstwhile USSR Red Data Book as being vulnerable.

== See also ==
- Papilionidae
- List of butterflies of India
- List of butterflies of India (Papilionidae)

== Other references ==
- Collins, N. Mark; Morris, Michael G. (1985). Threatened Swallowtail Butterflies of the World: The IUCN Red Data Book. Gland & Cambridge: IUCN. ISBN 978-2-88032-603-6 – via Biodiversity Heritage Library.
- Evans, W.H. (1932). The Identification of Indian Butterflies (2nd ed.). Mumbai, India: Bombay Natural History Society.
- Haribal, Meena (1992). The Butterflies of Sikkim Himalaya and Their Natural History. Gangtok, Sikkim, India: Sikkim Nature Conservation Foundation.
- Wynter-Blyth, Mark Alexander (1957). Butterflies of the Indian Region. Bombay, India: Bombay Natural History Society. ISBN 978-8170192329.
- Sakai S., Inaoka S., Toshiaki A., Yamaguchi S., Watanabe Y., (2002) The Parnassiology. The Parnassius Butterflies, A Study in Evolution, Kodansha, Japan. ISBN 4-06-124051-X
- Weiss Jean-Claude, (1999) Parnassiinae of the World, Hillside Books, Canterbury, UK. ISBN 0-9532240-2-3, OCLC 41072974
