= Gilles Terral =

French entomologist

Gilles Terral (1943 – 12 August 1998) was a French entomologist. He specialised in Lepidoptera Parnassiinae and Saturniidae.

As a Parnassius specialist he made an expedition to Ladakh with Jean-Claude Weiss in July 1983. As a Saturnid specialist he wrote articles with Philippe Darge and Claude Lemaire (see below).

He was working on a book on the Saturniidae of the world, to be published by Sciences Nat, most of the colour separations of the photos were already done for the printing. His collection of Saturniidae (251 boxes) is now at the Musée d'Histoire Naturelle de Lyon.

== Works ==
- 1991. Saturnides éthiopiens inédits, Bulletin de la Société Sciences Nat, 70, in collaboration with J.-P. Lequeux and Ph. Darge.
- 1994. Zur Verbreitung einiger asiatischer Saturniidae, Entomologische Zeitschrift (Essen), 104 (3), pp. 58–59, in collaboration with U. and L. H. Paukstadt.

== Species he described ==
- Gonimbrasia cocaulti, 1992 (with Philippe Darge)
- Melanocera dargei, 1991, Bulletin de la Société Sciences Nat, 70, p. 14.
- Melanocera widenti, 1991 (with Philippe Darge), Bulletin de la Société Sciences Nat, 70, p. 16.
- Periphoba attali, 1994 (with Claude Lemaire), Nachrichten des Entomologischen Vereins Apollo, N.F., 15 (3), p. 397.
- Ubaena lequeuxi, 1988 (with Philippe Darge).
- Ubaena periculosa, 1988 (with Philippe Darge).

== Species named after him ==
- Bunaeopsis terrali Darge, 1993.
- Coprophanaeus terrali Arnaud, Besoiro, 7, p. 2.
