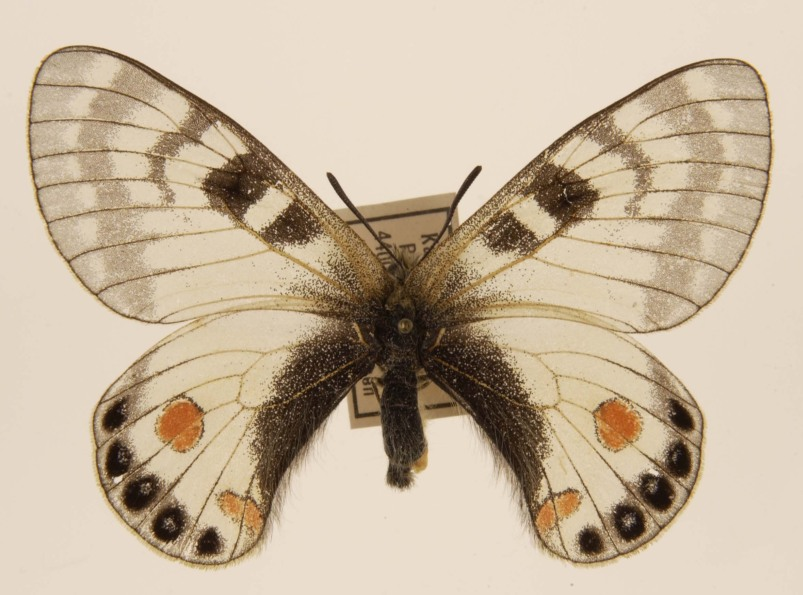
- Female P. s. nicevillei, Kashmir, Ladakh, Potu-la pass

Scientific classification
- Domain: Eukaryota
- Kingdom: Animalia
- Phylum: Arthropoda
- Class: Insecta
- Order: Lepidoptera
- Family: Papilionidae
- Genus: Parnassius
- Species: P. stoliczkanus

Binomial name
- Parnassius stoliczkanus C. & R. Felder, 1864

Synonyms
- Parnassius delphius stoliczkanus C & R Felder, 1864

= Parnassius stoliczkanus =

Ladakh banded Apollo

Species of butterfly

Parnassius stoliczkanus, the Ladakh banded Apollo, is a rare high-altitude butterfly which is found in Central Asia. It is a member of the snow Apollo genus (Parnassius) of the swallowtail family. It is named after the naturalist and explorer Ferdinand Stoliczka.

== Description ==
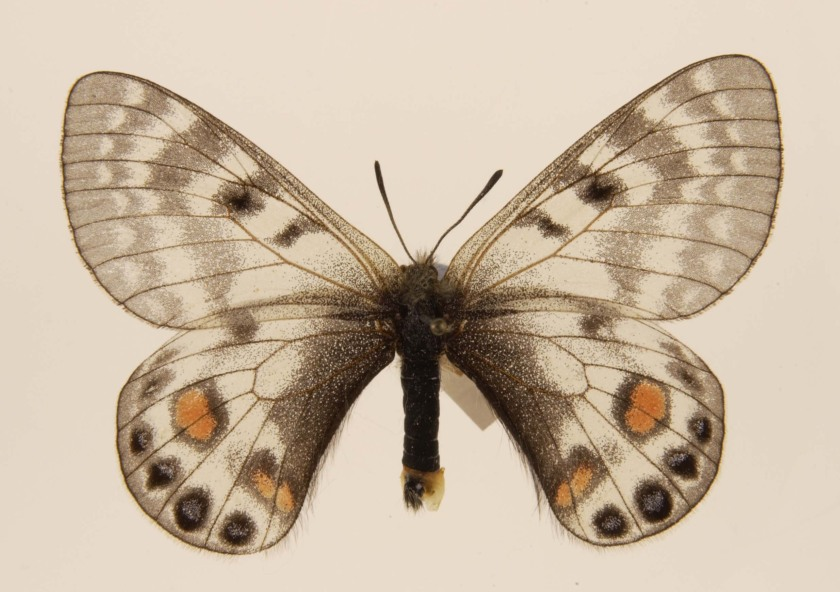
Subspecies P. s. atkinsoni from Ladakh

Male upperside dull white. Forewing: base and costal margin irrorated with black scales; cell with the usual medial and apical short black transverse bars, the former not extended down to the median vein in typical specimens; discal and postdiscal dusky black sinuate bands, the former attenuated below vein 6, stops short of the dorsum, the latter extends right down to the dorsal margin; beyond these bands the terminal margin is more or less shaded with dusky black which at the tornus coalesces with the postdiscal band. Hindwing: dorsal margin broadly dusky black, this colour narrowed towards the tornus; a postdiscal black-encircled red spot in interspace 5; termen somewhat broadly dusky black, with a subterminal series of darker spots in the interspaces and the dorsal margin fringed with long white hairs. Cilia of both forewings and hindwings white. Underside: like the upperside, the ground colour with the glassy appearance common to all forms in the genus; markings similar, apparent however more by transparency from above than formed by actual scaling. Antennae, head, thorax and abdomen black, the tufted hairs on the head in front fuscous; beneath: the palpi, thorax and abdomen clothed with fuscous hairs.

Female upperside the ground colour differs from that of the 6 in its duller somewhat yellowish tint; the markings are similar but on the hindwing the spots in the subterminal series are centred with blue, the postdiscal red spot is paler, often absent, while in some specimens there is a subtornal red spot. Underside: similar to that of the male. In both sexes the basal red spots on the underside of the hindwing so general in the forms of this genus are usually, if not always, lacking. Antennae, head, thorax and abdomen as in the male. Anal pouch in the fertilized female as in Parnassius hunza.

== Range ==
It ranges from Afghanistan, Pakistan and Kashmir, the northern ranges of India (Himachal Pradesh and Uttarakhand), and China (Tibet).

== Subspecies ==
- Parnassius stoliczkanus atkinsoni Moore (Kashmir: Pir Pinjal, Sind Valley, Burzil Pass. India: Pradesh) The bands of forewing broader, all three complete, submarginal spots within the marginal band of hindwing distinctly blue, two ocelli, the posterior one enlarged, and two red centred hindmarginal spots.
- Parnassius stoliczkanus beate Eisner (Kashmir: Karakoram, Potu-la Pass, Chalsi, Leh)
- Parnassius stoliczkanus chitralica Verity (Pakistan: Chitral)
- Parnassius stoliczkanus florenciae Tytler (Tibet: Phupes Hundes, Tibu, Churmurti)
- Parnassius stoliczkanus gracilis Bryk & Eisner (India: Himachal Pradesh, Kangra, Rohtang Pass)
- Parnassius stoliczkanus imitator Bryk & Eisner (former U.S.S.R.: Tadzhikistan, Pamirs, Beik Pass)
- Parnassius stoliczkanus kutnaonensis Riley (India: Uttar Pradesh, Kumaon, Shillung)
- Parnassius stoliczkanus nicevillei Avinoff (Kashmir: Pir Pinjal, Burzil Pass, Sari Sungur Pass, Sapta La)
- Parnassius stoliczkanus parangensis Eisner (India: Himachal Pradesh, Parang Pass, Bara Lacha Pass. Kashmir: Tagalang Pass, Lingti, Ladahk)
- Parnassius stoliczkanus riteyi Tytler (Kashmir: Rupal Valley, Astor)
- Parnassius stoliczkanus spitiensis Bang-Haas (Tibet: Spiti, Tum-Tum-Thang, Churmurti)
- Parnassius stoliczkanus stoliczkanus Felder & Felder (Ladak, Rupshu, Sapta La)
- Parnassius stoliczkanus tenuis Bryk & Eisner (Kashmir: Gya-Ladahk, Tagalang Pass)
- Parnassius stoliczkanus tytlerianus Bryk & Eisner (Kashmir: Chitral, Bangol Pass)
- Parnassius stoliczkanus zanskarica Bang-Haas (Kashmir: Nira, Zanskar Mountains)
- Parnassius stoliczkanus zogilaica Tytler (Kashmir: Zogila) Generally smaller than the typical delphius. Red costal spot of hindwing upperside usually absent.

== Status ==
William Harry Evans said that it was very rare. Further information is needed on this species. The butterfly is protected by law in India.

== Identification ==
The Parnassius species of butterflies are often hard to identify and can sometimes only be identified by dissection of the genitalia. P. R. Ackery (1975) provides a key available online. will key to Parnassius delphius but it is smaller and has better defined markings. The discal band of forewing shortened, in exceptional cases running into the submarginal band. Hindwing with broad marginal band, in which there stand four or five darker spots, which are dusted with blue in the female; as a rule only one ocellus preserved, namely the posterior one, being sometimes reduced to a dot; moreover, often a red hindmarginal dot.

== See also ==
- Papilionidae
- List of butterflies of India
- List of butterflies of India (Papilionidae)

== Sources ==
- Sakai S., Inaoka S., Toshiaki A., Yamaguchi S., Watanabe Y., (2002) The Parnassiology. The Parnassius Butterflies, A Study in Evolution, Kodansha, Japan.
- Weiss J.-C., (1992) Parnassiinae of the World - Part 2, Sciences Nat, Venette, France.
