= Holzinger =

Holzinger (or Hölzinger) is a German surname. It may refer to:

== People ==
- Brian Holzinger (born 1972), American ice hockey player
- Florentina Holzinger (born 1986), Austrian choreographer, director and performance artist
- Helmuth Holzinger (1928–1992), Austrian entomologist
- John Michael Holzinger (1853–1929), German-born American bryologist
- Karl Holzinger (1892–1954), American psychologist
- Juan José Holzinger (died 1864), German colonel in the Mexican Army during the Texas Revolution

== Other ==
- Diureticum-Holzinger, another name for the molecule acetazolamide
- Holzinger class patrol vessel, an offshore patrol vessels class in use by the Mexican Navy

== See also ==
- Holsinger
