= The Beetles of the World =

The Beetles of the World is a series of books devoted to Coleopterology. Sciences Nat published the 24 first volumes; the following volumes and the supplements were published by Hillside Books, Canterbury.

The first book authored by Jacques Rigout was published in French Les Coléoptères du Monde in 1981 by Sciences Nat, and the book is a revision the genus Batocera. The author printed the book himself, page by page. The 500 copy volume was professionally bound but was soon out of print. A second edition was printed by a professional in 1986.

New authors came quickly to publish in the series. There were French specialists such as Gilbert Lachaume (Goliathini), Jean-Pierre Lacroix (Lucanidae), Patrick Bleuzen (Cerambycidae), Thierry Porion (Curculionidae), Roger-Paul Dechambre (Dynastidae), Marc Soula (Rutelinae) or Patrick Arnaud (Scarabaeidae), but also authorities from Belgium: Vincent Allard (Cetoniidae); Switzerland: Tiéry Lander (Buprestidae); Mexico: Miguel-Angel Morón (Rutelidae); Italy: Pierfranco Cavazzuti, Pietro Ratti, Achile Casale (Carabidae); and Germany: Karl Werner (Cicindelidae). These authors also frequently published entomological articles in the journal Bulletin de la Société Sciences Nat.
