= Holsinger =

Holsinger (in Germany mostly spelled Holzinger) is a German surname. Notable people with the surname include:

- David Holsinger (born 1945), American composer and conductor
- Henry R. Holsinger (1833–1905), American pastor, publisher and leader of The Brethren Church
- James W. Holsinger (born 1939), American physician and retired major general of the U.S. Army nominated to be Surgeon General of the United States
- Rufus W. Holsinger (1866–1930), American photographer

== See also ==
- Holzinger (disambiguation)
