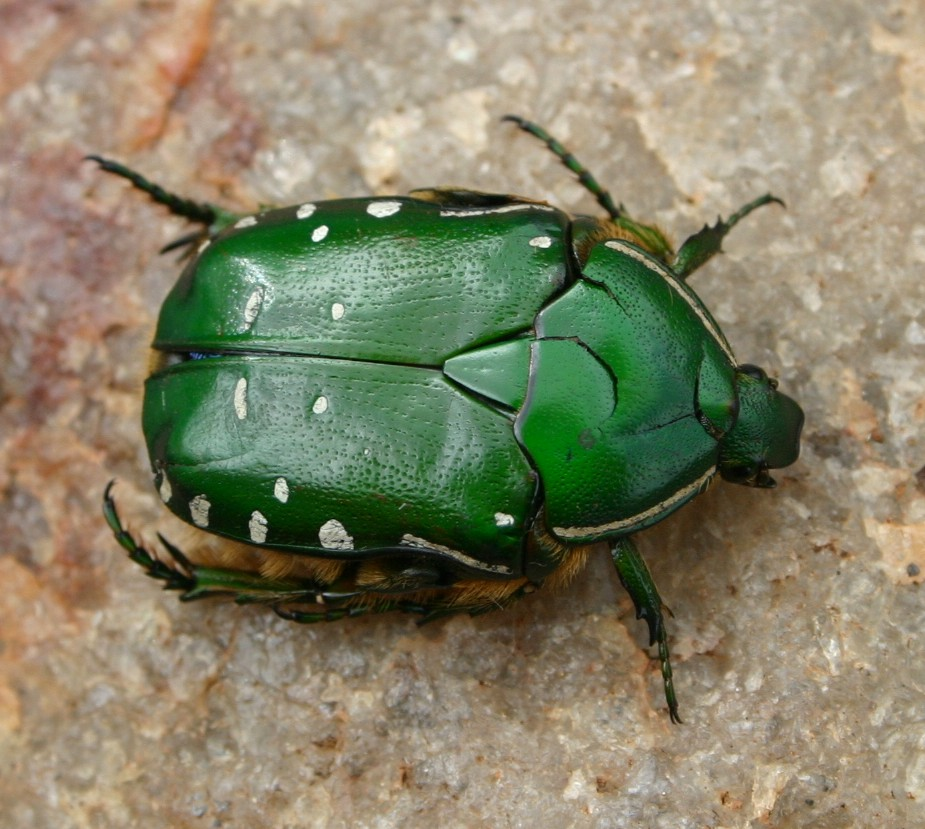

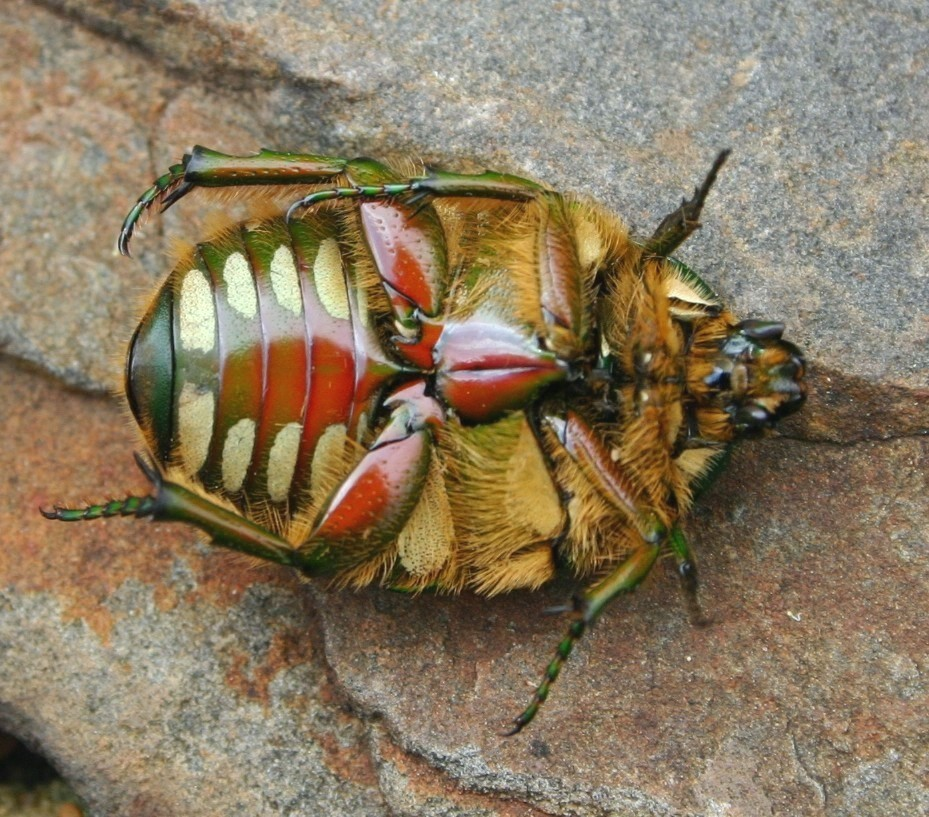

Scientific classification
- Kingdom: Animalia
- Phylum: Arthropoda
- Clade: Pancrustacea
- Class: Insecta
- Order: Coleoptera
- Suborder: Polyphaga
- Infraorder: Scarabaeiformia
- Superfamily: Scarabaeoidea
- Family: Scarabaeidae
- Subfamily: Cetoniinae
- Genus: Rhabdotis
- Species: R. aulica

Binomial name
- Rhabdotis aulica (Fabricius, 1781)

Synonyms
- Cetonia aulica Fabricius, 1781

= Rhabdotis aulica =

Species of beetle

Rhabdotis aulica, known as the emerald fruit chafer, is a species of Scarabaeidae, the dung beetle family, and is found in Africa. Adult beetles, which are about 25 millimetres (0.98 in) long, feed on flowers and fruit, laying their eggs in goat and cattle manure. The pupae develop inside egg-shaped protective clay shells.

== Description ==
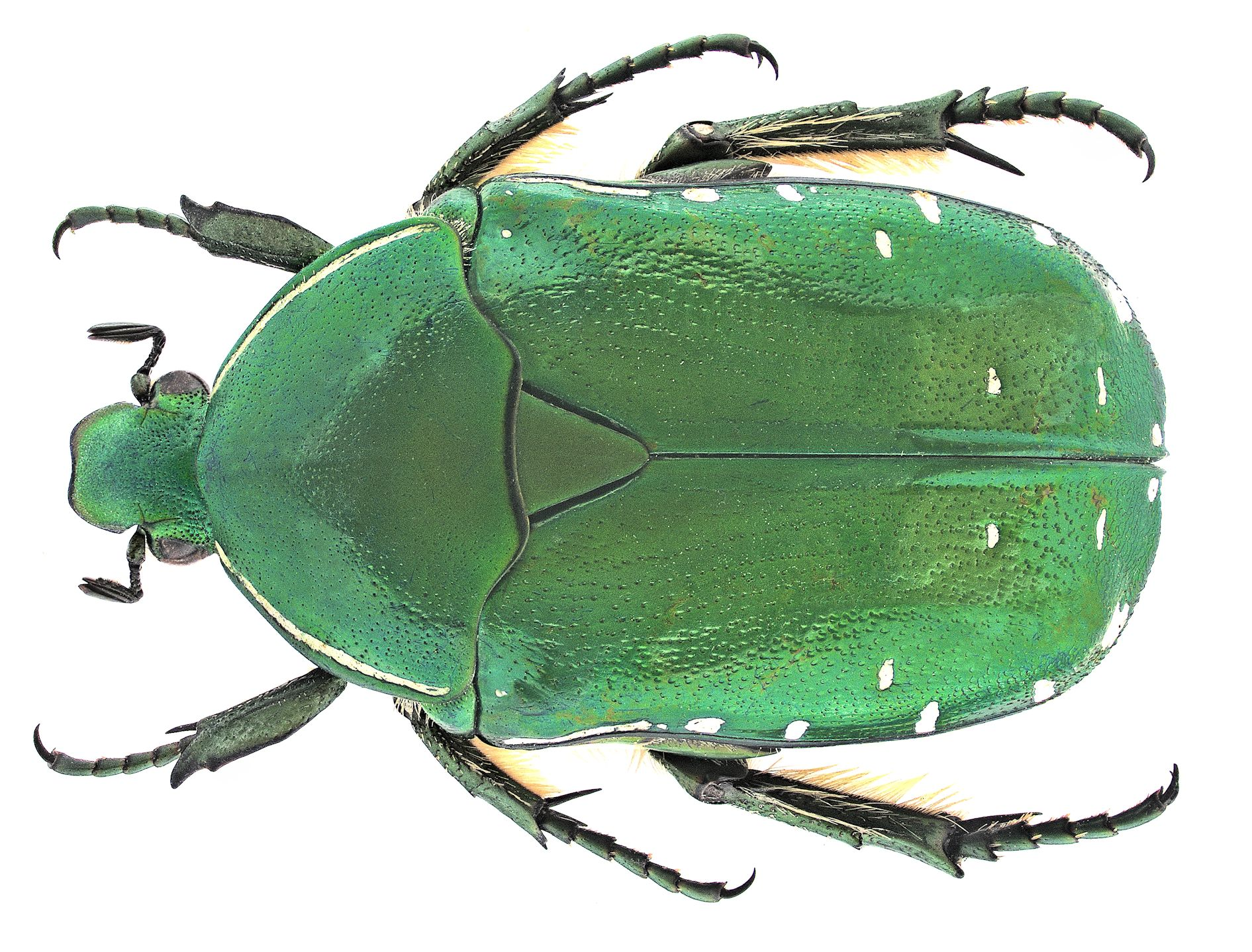
Rhabdotis aulica

Pronotum with a white marginal/elytral band. Elytra with white dots drawn out transversally, comprising a humeral dot, an apical dot, 2 or 3 discal dots on the posterior half of the elytra and 5 marginal dots extended by a subhumeral dash. Tibia green.

== Subspecies ==
- Rhabdotis aulica ssp. impunctata Allard, 1992
- Rhabdotis aulica ssp. perpunctata Allard, 1992
