= Jean-Pierre Lacroix =

Jean-Pierre Lacroix may refer to:

- Jean-Pierre Lacroix (civil servant), French civil servant
- Jean-Pierre Lacroix (diplomat), French diplomat
- Jean-Pierre Lacroix (entomologist), French entomologist
