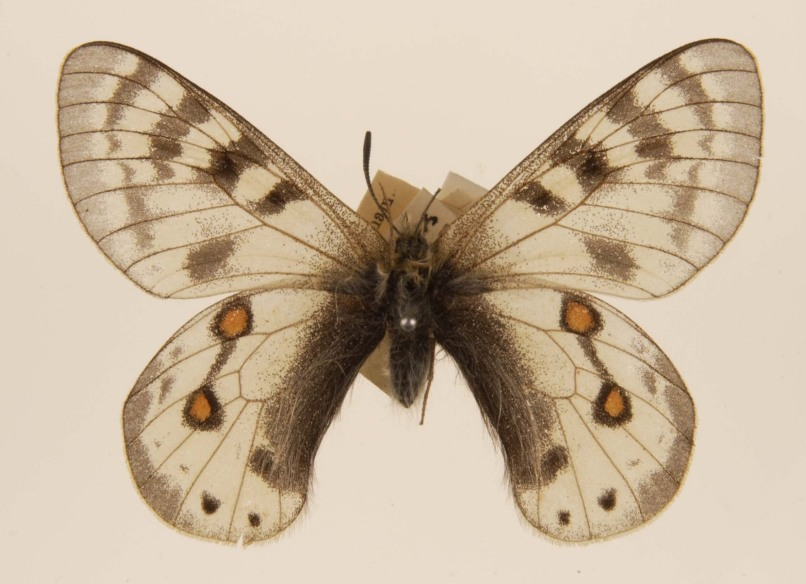
- Subspecies Karakoram banded Apollo

Scientific classification
- Kingdom: Animalia
- Phylum: Arthropoda
- Class: Insecta
- Order: Lepidoptera
- Family: Papilionidae
- Genus: Parnassius
- Species: P. staudingeri

Binomial name
- Parnassius staudingeri A. Bang-Haas, 1882

Synonyms
- Parnassius hunza Grum-Grshimailo, 1888

= Parnassius staudingeri =

Species of butterfly

Parnassius staudingeri is a high-altitude butterfly which is found over a vast area - Pamirs, Altay Mountains, Hindu Kush, Karakorum and west Kuen-Lun.

It is a member of the genus Parnassius of the swallowtail family, Papilionidae.

A notable subspecies is the Karakoram banded Apollo (P. s. hunza).

== Description ==
The ground colour of the main form is purer and more extended white than in Parnassius delphius, bands of forewing rather sharply defined, but narrow, no black shading on disc in male, hindmarginal spot present; hindwing with narrow grey margin, a submarginal band of halfmoons, two rather large blackish anal spots, small ocelli, filled in with deep red. Female with stronger markings, disc of forewing dusted with black, submarginal band broader, ocelli of hindwing larger, the margin of hindwing more strongly blackened. From Sarafshan (Samarkand), Alai and Transalai mountains.
