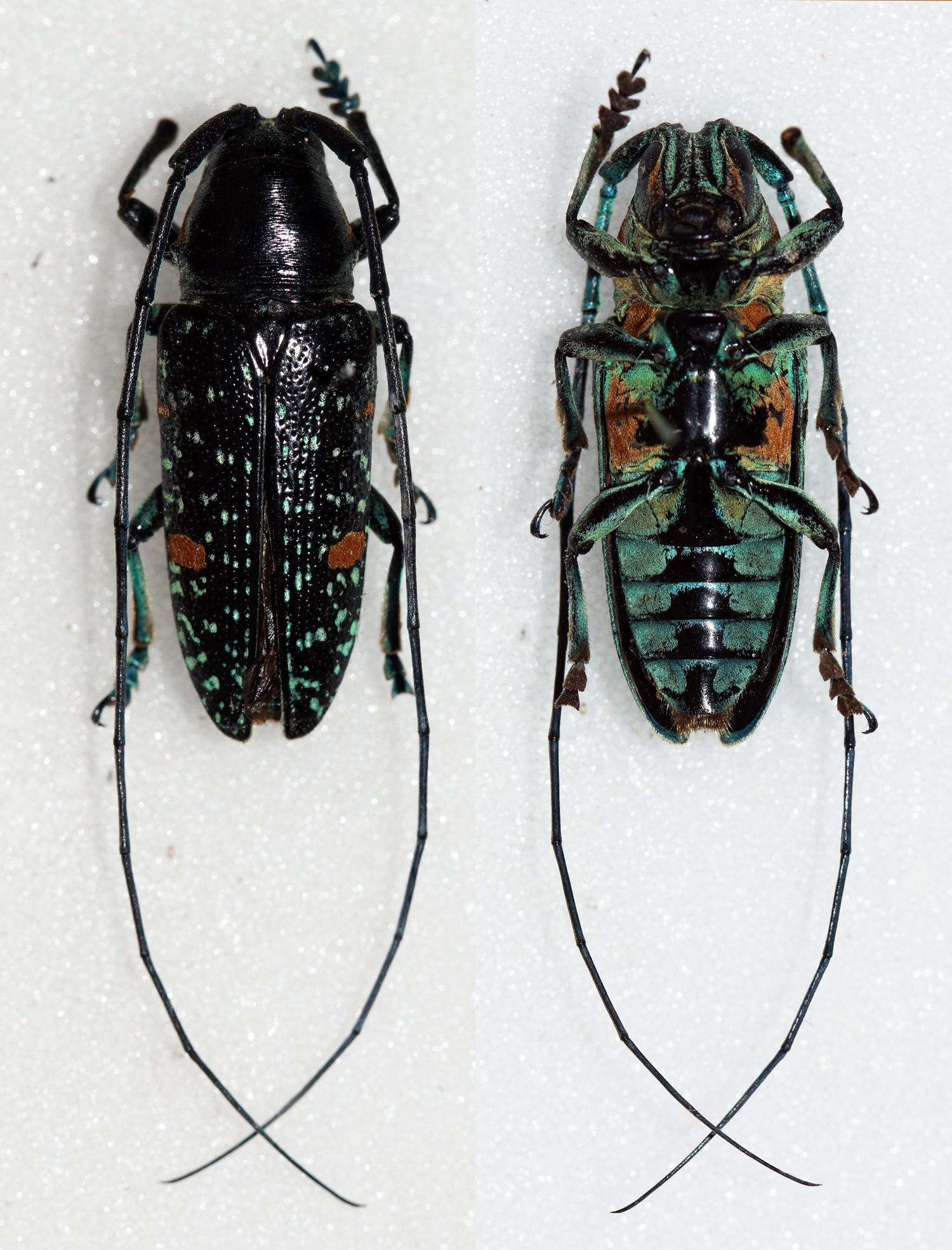
- Pinacosterna nachtigali

Scientific classification
- Kingdom: Animalia
- Phylum: Arthropoda
- Class: Insecta
- Order: Coleoptera
- Suborder: Polyphaga
- Infraorder: Cucujiformia
- Family: Cerambycidae
- Subfamily: Lamiinae
- Tribe: Sternotomini
- Genus: Pinacosterna; Harold, 1879

= Pinacosterna =

Genus of beetles

Pinacosterna is a genus of longhorn beetles of the subfamily Lamiinae, containing the following species:

- Pinacosterna marginalis Breuning, 1935
- Pinacosterna mechowi Quedenfeldt, 1882
- Pinacosterna mimica Jordan, 1903
- Pinacosterna nachtigali Harold, 1879
- Pinacosterna weymanni Quedenfeldt, 1882
