= Marc Soula =

- Born: 27 April 1945; Oran, French Algeria
- Died: 23 February 2012 (aged 66); Lima, Peru
- Education: Gautier High School in Algiers

Marc Soula (27 April 1945 – 23 February 2012) was a French entomologist. He was born in Oran (French Algeria) and died in Lima (Peru).

== Published works ==
The majority of Soula's publications dealt with scarab beetles of the subfamily Rutelinae. He studied the collection of these insects of the Entomology Laboratory of the Muséum national d'histoire naturelle of Paris. He published his works in the series The Beetles of the World. He wrote volumes 26 and 29, with their supplements 26.1, 26.2 and 26.3. He published the books "Les Coléoptères du Nouveau Monde", with five volumes, as a supplement to the journal Besoiro, as well as a few descriptive notes. In 2002, he described the genus Maripa to make a play on words with the place name Maripasoula, a commune of French Guiana. As this name was preoccupied, however, he replaced it with a new name, Theuremaripa which means "do not get married again" in French. In total, he described 515 taxa over his career.

== Insect species named after him ==
- Aegognathus soulai Arnaud & Bomans, 2004
- Dicranobia soulai Devecis, 2006
- Enchophora soulai Bleuzen & Porion, 2004
- Popillia soulai Limbourg, 2008
- Protaetia soulai Arnaud, 2004
- Spodochlamys soulai Curoe, 2011
