= Rhabdotis ugandensis =

Scientific classification
- Domain: Eukaryota
- Kingdom: Animalia
- Phylum: Arthropoda
- Class: Insecta
- Order: Coleoptera
- Suborder: Polyphaga
- Infraorder: Scarabaeiformia
- Family: Scarabaeidae
- Genus: Rhabdotis
- Species: R. ugandensis

Binomial name
- Rhabdotis ugandensis (Antoine, Beinhundner & Legrand, 2003)

Species of beetle

Rhabdotis ugandensis is a species of Scarabaeidae, the dung beetle family.
