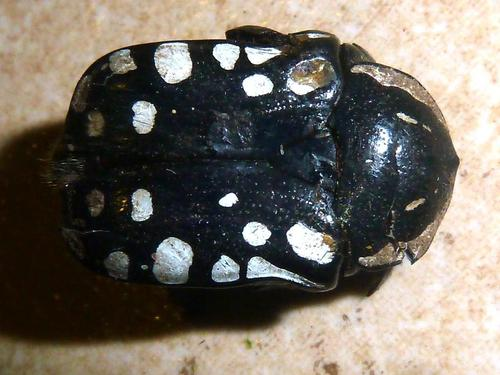

Scientific classification
- Kingdom: Animalia
- Phylum: Arthropoda
- Class: Insecta
- Order: Coleoptera
- Suborder: Polyphaga
- Infraorder: Scarabaeiformia
- Family: Scarabaeidae
- Genus: Rhabdotis
- Species: R. albinigra

Binomial name
- Rhabdotis albinigra (Burmeister, 1847)

Synonyms
- Pachnoda albinigra Burmeister, 1847; Cetonia (Pachnoda) albopicta Boheman, 1857

= Rhabdotis albinigra =

Species of beetle

Rhabdotis albinigra is a species of Scarabaeidae, the dung beetle family. It was described by Hermann Burmeister in 1847.
