= Rhabdotis semipunctata =

Scientific classification
- Kingdom: Animalia
- Phylum: Arthropoda
- Class: Insecta
- Order: Coleoptera
- Suborder: Polyphaga
- Infraorder: Scarabaeiformia
- Family: Scarabaeidae
- Genus: Rhabdotis
- Species: R. semipunctata

Binomial name
- Rhabdotis semipunctata (Fabricius 1787)

Synonyms
- Cetonia chalca (Gory & Percheron, 1833); Cetonia semipunctata (Fabricius, 1787); Cetonia stephensi (Vigors, 1826); Rhabdotis chalcea (Fairmaire, 1888); Rhabdotis transvaalica (Peringuey, 1907); Scarabaeus chalca (Herbst, 1790)

Species of beetle

Rhabdotis semipunctata is a species of Scarabaeidae, the dung beetle family.
