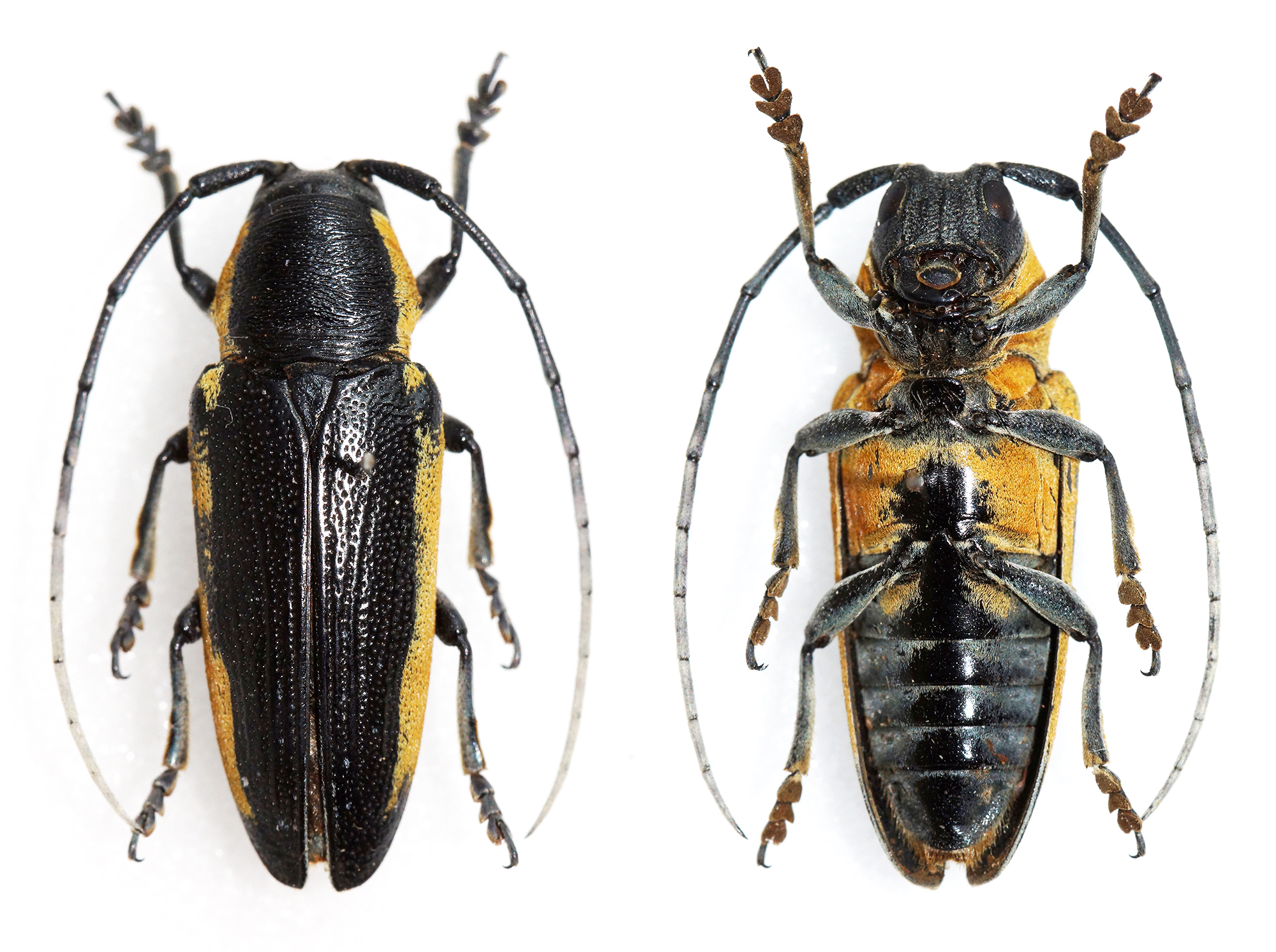

Scientific classification
- Kingdom: Animalia
- Phylum: Arthropoda
- Class: Insecta
- Order: Coleoptera
- Suborder: Polyphaga
- Infraorder: Cucujiformia
- Family: Cerambycidae
- Genus: Pinacosterna
- Species: P. marginalis

Binomial name
- Pinacosterna marginalis Breuning, 1935

= Pinacosterna marginalis =

Species of beetle

Pinacosterna marginalis is a species of beetle in the family Cerambycidae. It was described by Stephan von Breuning in 1935.
