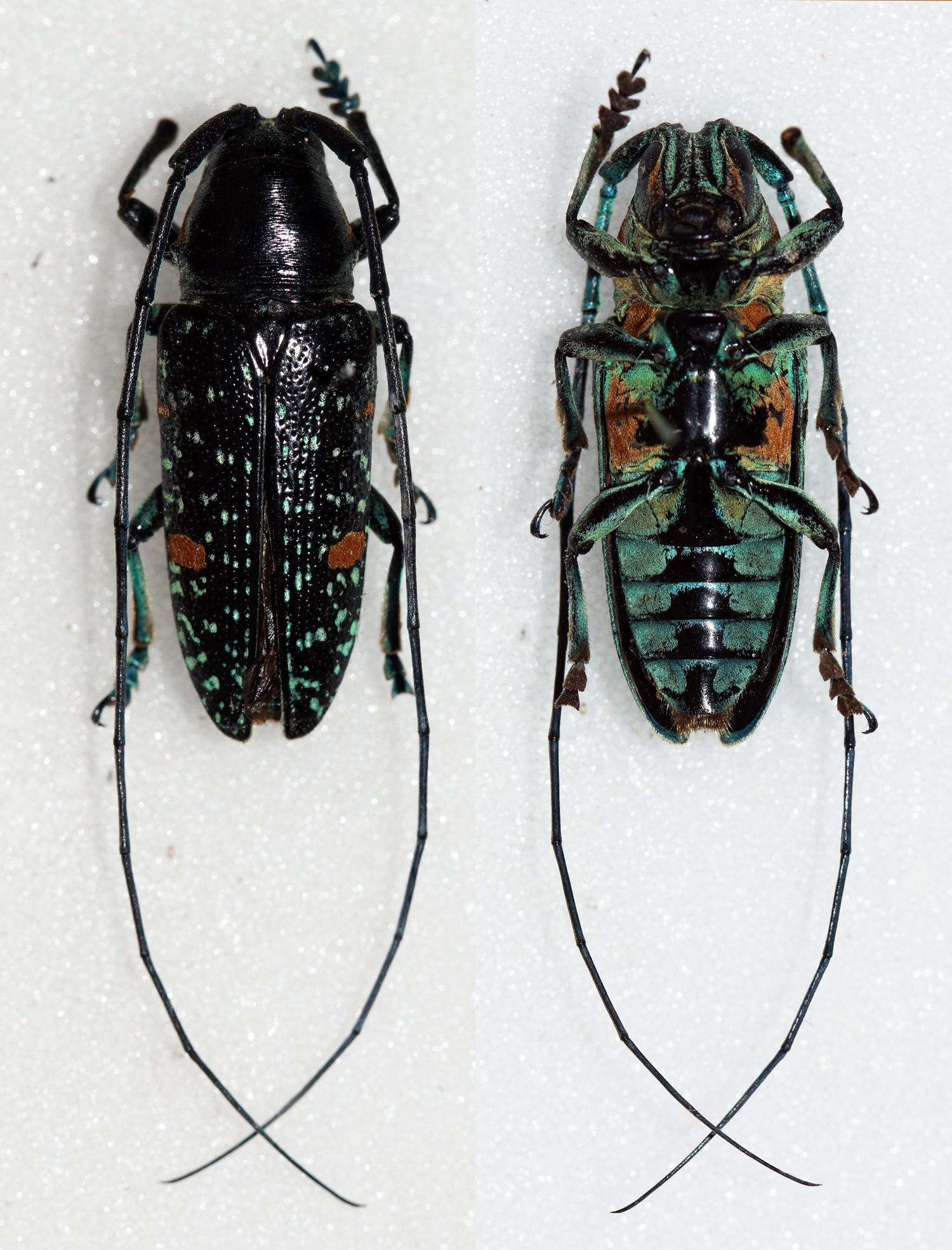

Scientific classification
- Kingdom: Animalia
- Phylum: Arthropoda
- Class: Insecta
- Order: Coleoptera
- Suborder: Polyphaga
- Infraorder: Cucujiformia
- Family: Cerambycidae
- Genus: Pinacosterna
- Species: P. nachtigali

Binomial name
- Pinacosterna nachtigali Harold, 1879

= Pinacosterna nachtigali =

Species of beetle

Pinacosterna nachtigali is a species of beetle in the family Cerambycidae. It was described by Edgar von Harold in 1879. It feeds on Coffea canephora.
