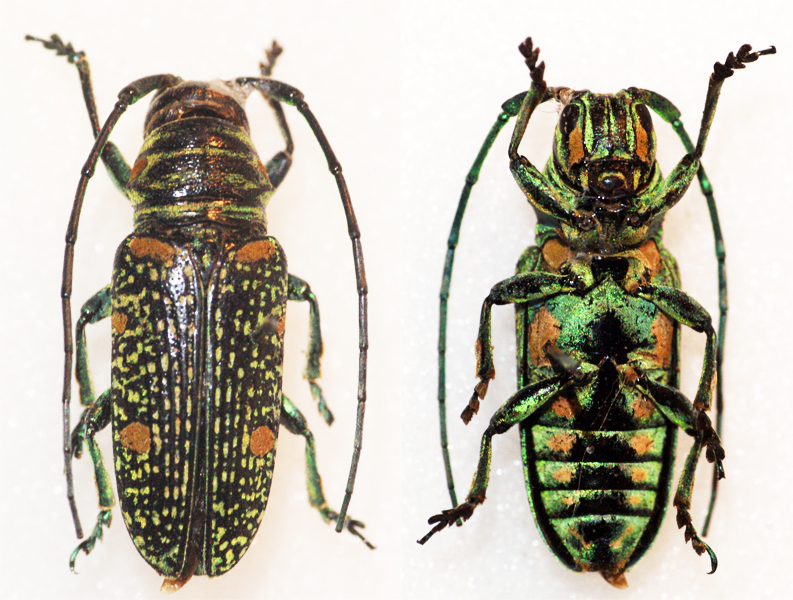

Scientific classification
- Kingdom: Animalia
- Phylum: Arthropoda
- Class: Insecta
- Order: Coleoptera
- Suborder: Polyphaga
- Infraorder: Cucujiformia
- Family: Cerambycidae
- Genus: Pinacosterna
- Species: P. mimica

Binomial name
- Pinacosterna mimica Jordan, 1903

= Pinacosterna mimica =

Species of beetle

Pinacosterna mimica is a species of beetle in the family Cerambycidae. It was described by Karl Jordan in 1903.
