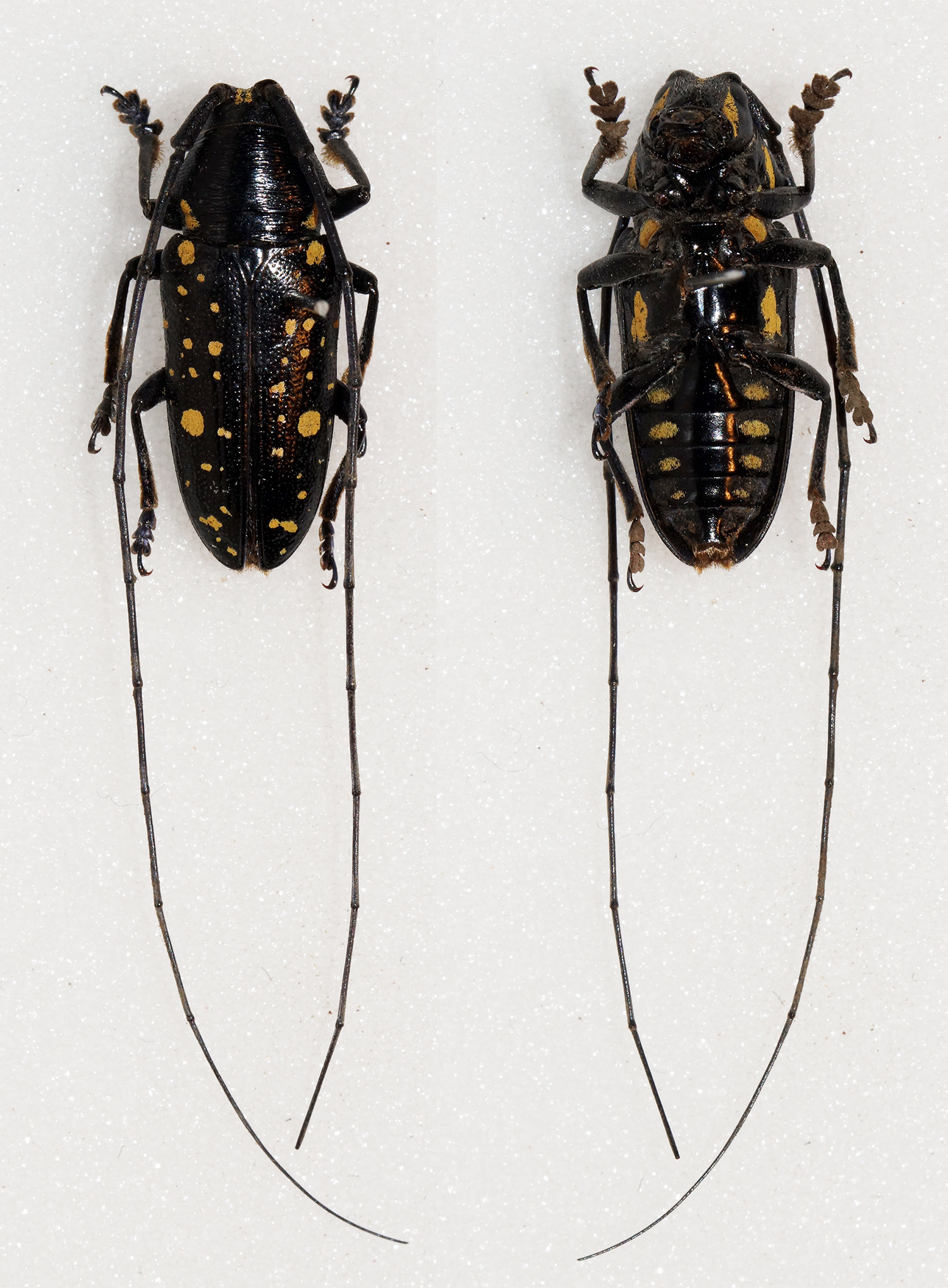

Scientific classification
- Kingdom: Animalia
- Phylum: Arthropoda
- Class: Insecta
- Order: Coleoptera
- Suborder: Polyphaga
- Infraorder: Cucujiformia
- Family: Cerambycidae
- Genus: Pinacosterna
- Species: P. mechowi

Binomial name
- Pinacosterna mechowi Quedenfeldt, 1882

= Pinacosterna mechowi =

Species of beetle

Pinacosterna mechowi is a species of beetle in the family Cerambycidae. It was described by Quedenfeldt in 1882. It is known from Rwanda, the Republic of the Congo, the Democratic Republic of the Congo, Angola, the Central African Republic, and Zambia.
