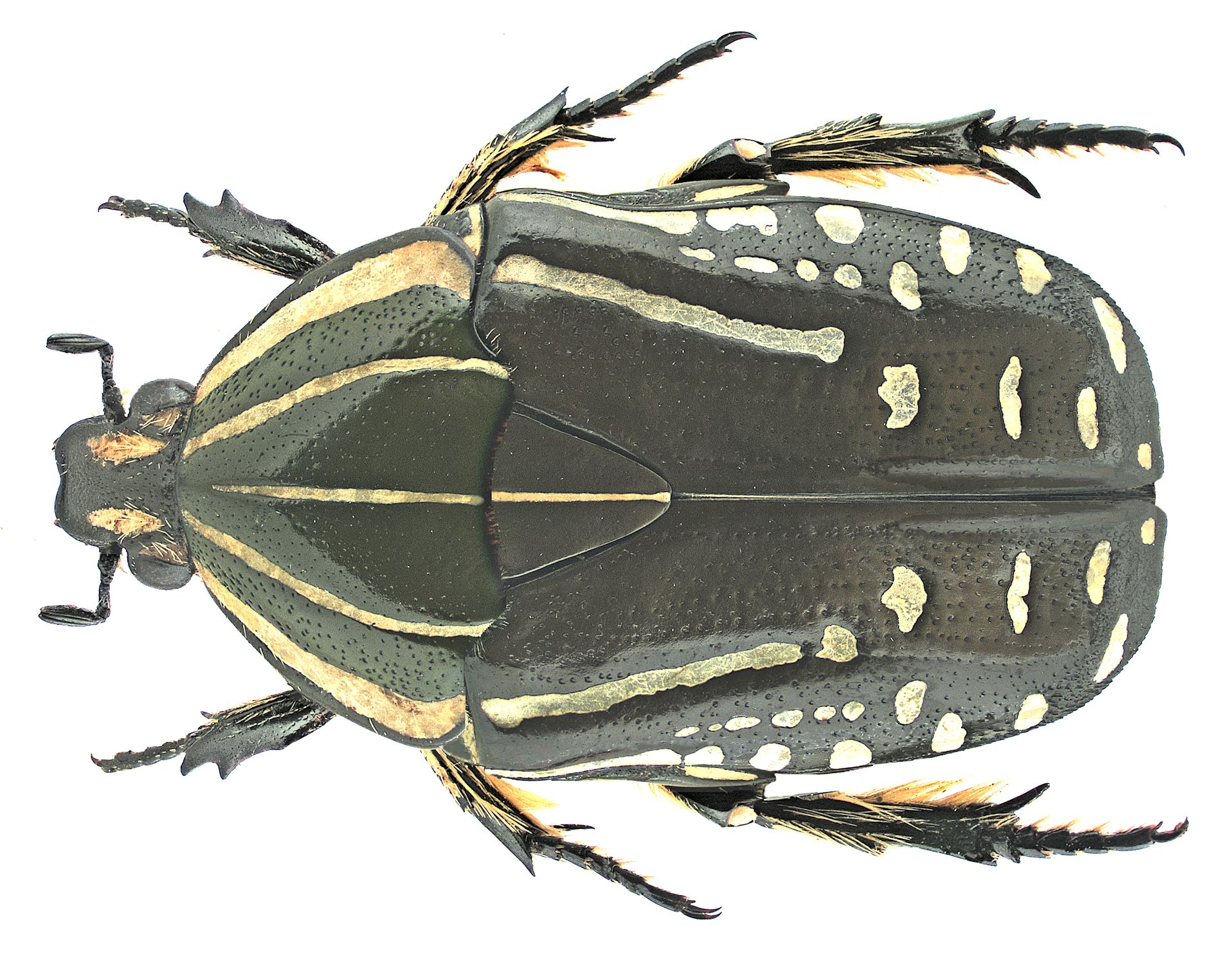

Scientific classification
- Domain: Eukaryota
- Kingdom: Animalia
- Phylum: Arthropoda
- Class: Insecta
- Order: Coleoptera
- Suborder: Polyphaga
- Infraorder: Scarabaeiformia
- Family: Scarabaeidae
- Genus: Rhabdotis
- Species: R. sobrina

Binomial name
- Rhabdotis sobrina (Gory & Percheron 1833)

= Rhabdotis sobrina =

Species of beetle

Rhabdotis sobrina is a species of Scarabaeidae, the dung beetle family.

== Subspecies ==
- Rhabdotis sobrina aethiopica (Allard, 1992)
- Rhabdotis sobrina virginea,
