= Rufus W. Holsinger =

American photographer

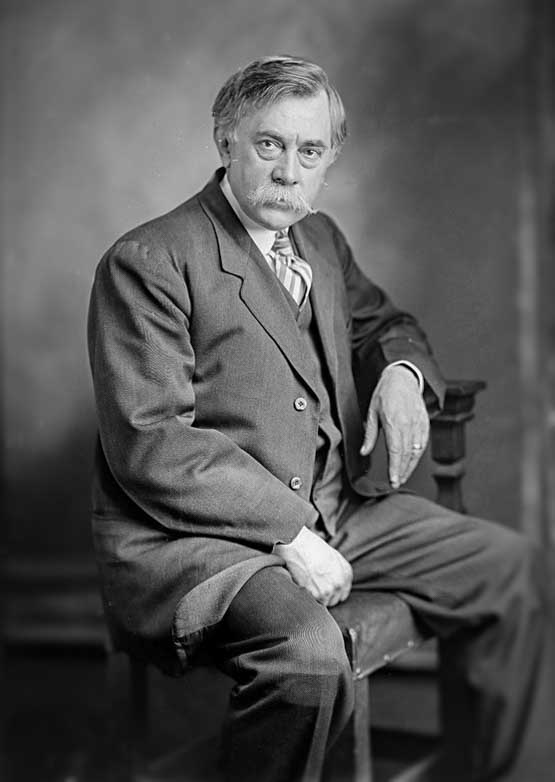
- A self portrait of the photographer in 1913
- Born: 1866; Bedford, Pennsylvania, US
- Died: 1930, age about 64 years Charlottesville, Virginia, US
- Known for: Photography
- Spouse: Sallie Leland Anderson

Rufus W. Holsinger (1866–1930) was an American photographer based in Charlottesville, Virginia, United States. His 9000 remaining black-and-white photographic plates and 500 celluloid negatives are maintained in the Albert and Shirley Small Special Collections Library at the University of Virginia.

== Birth ==
Holsinger was born in 1866 in Bedford County, Pennsylvania, to parents Thomas and Elizabeth Holsinger.

== Career ==
In the late 1880s, Holsinger settled in Charlottesville and opened the Holsinger University Studio on West Main Street. He was active in local politics and served as treasurer of the Photographers Association of America.
