= Jean-Pierre Lacroix (entomologist) =

French entomologist (1938–1989)

Jean-Pierre Lacroix (1938–1989) was a French entomologist.

== Book ==
The Beetles of the World, Odontolabini 1 (Lucanidae)

== Works ==
The complete list of his publications was written by Hugues E. Bomans.

Some of his last works include:

- 1982 - Notes sur quelques Coleoptera Lucanidae nouveaux ou peu connus, Miscellanea Entomologica, 49, pp. 13–30.
- 1983 - Descriptions de Coleoptera Lucanidae nouveaux ou peu connus (2ème note) (in collaboration with P. Ratti and G. Taroni), Bulletin de la Société Sciences Nat, 38, pp. 2–8.
- 1983 - Descriptions de Coleoptera Lucanidae nouveaux ou peu connus (3ème note), Bulletin de la Société Sciences Nat, 40, pp. 5–19.
- 1987 - Descriptions de Coleoptera Lucanidae nouveaux ou peu connus (4ème note), Bulletin de la Société Sciences Nat, 56, pp. 11–13, 1 col. plate.
- 1988 - Descriptions de Coleoptera Lucanidae nouveaux ou peu connus (5ème note), Bulletin de la Société Sciences Nat, 57, pp. 7–12.
- 1989 - Descriptions de Coleoptera Lucanidae nouveaux ou peu connus (6ème note), Bulletin de la Société Sciences Nat, 59, pp. 5–7, 1 col. plate.
- 1990 - Descriptions de Coleoptera Lucanidae nouveaux ou peu connus (7ème note), Bulletin de la Société Sciences Nat, 65, pp. 11–14, 1 col. plate.
- 1991 - Descriptions de Coleoptera Lucanidae nouveaux ou peu connus (8ème note), Bulletin de la Société Sciences Nat, 69, pp. 25–26.

== Entomological terms named after him ==
- Aegus platypodon lacroixi Bomans, 1993
- Cyclommatus lacroixi Weinreich, 1971
- Ditomoderus lacroixi Bomans, 1973
- Homoderinus lacroixi Bomans, 1969
- Lissotes lacroixi Bomans, 1986
- Prosopocoilus lacroixi Bomans, 1970

== Taxa created by Lacroix ==
A list of 95 new names created by Lacroix has been published on the web. Among them are several new species of Cyclommatus, which were never the object of a publication. In fact, Lacroix prepared a revision of the genus to appear in a volume of the series of The Beetles of the World; almost all the photos had been taken by Guy Bouloux. A heart attack at the age of 51 ended this project. Another work in preparation was a fauna of the Stag beetles of the island of Sumatra, thanks to the numerous sendings of specimens captured on the spot by Dr. Eduard W. Diehl.
