= Helmuth Holzinger =

Austrian entomologist

Helmuth Holzinger (May 15, 1928 – October 1, 1992) was an Austrian entomologist. He was born in Vienna and died there., In 1953, he married Ruth Raffael, a painter, who painted all plates of his monograph. In 1972, he became editor of the Zeitschrift der Arbeitsgemeinschaft der österreichischen Entomologen, where nearly all his publications would be published.

Holzinger specialized in the study of Heliconius and became a world-renowned specialist publishing his works mainly in German but also in English.

After his death, his huge monograph on the genus Heliconius was published by Sciences Nat. His collection of about 2900 specimens is now at Naturhistorisches Museum, Vienna.

== Species named after Holzinger ==
- Bothriocera holzingeri O'Brien 2006
- Heliconius numata holzingeri K. Brown & Fernández Yepez, 1976
- Phaeostigma holzingeri Rausch & Aspock, 1993

== List of taxa described ==
Holzinger never described a taxon alone, his name was nearly always associated with his wife's.

- Eueides eanes koenigi Holzinger & Holzinger, 1992
- Eueides tales franciscus Brown & Holzinger, 1973
- Heliconius c. c. f. tenebrosa Holzinger & Holzinger, 1968
- Heliconius c. g. f. flavissima Holzinger & Holzinger, 1968
- Heliconius c. g. f. gerstneri Holzinger & Holzinger, 1968
- Heliconius c. g. f. pseudoweymeri Holzinger & Holzinger, 1968
- Heliconius c. gerstneri f. denhezi Holzinger & Holzinger, 1968
- Heliconius cydno cydnides f. semicydnides Holzinger & Holzinger, 1968
- Heliconius demeter ucayalensis Holzinger & Holzinger, 1975
- Heliconius hecuba creusa Holzinger & Holzinger, 1989
- Heliconius xanthocles cleoxanthe Holzinger & Holzinger, 1971
- Heliconius xanthocles hippocrene Holzinger & Brown, 1982
- Heliconius xanthocles napoensis Holzinger & Brown, 1982
- Heliconius xanthocles rindgei Holzinger & Brown, 1982
- Heliconius xanthocles zamora Holzinger & Brown, 1982
- Zygaena (Mesembrynus) cynarae picena Holzinger & Holzinger, 1979
