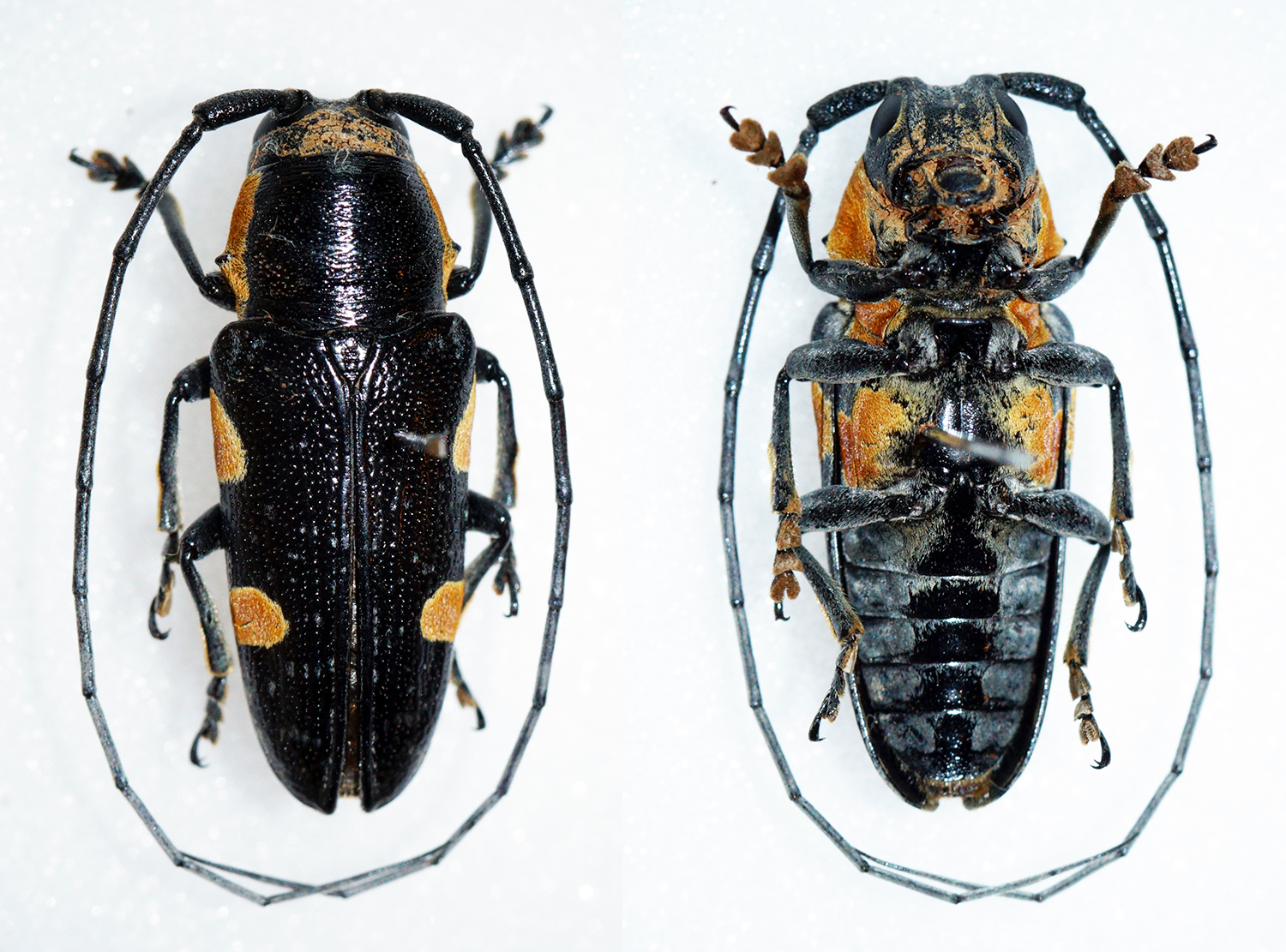

Scientific classification
- Kingdom: Animalia
- Phylum: Arthropoda
- Class: Insecta
- Order: Coleoptera
- Suborder: Polyphaga
- Infraorder: Cucujiformia
- Family: Cerambycidae
- Genus: Pinacosterna
- Species: P. weymanni

Binomial name
- Pinacosterna weymanni Quedenfeldt, 1882

Synonyms
- Pinacosterna weymanni m. fallaciosa Teocchi, 1997; Pinacosterna weymanni bandundu Allard, 1993

= Pinacosterna weymanni =

Species of beetle

Pinacosterna weymanni is a species of beetle in the family Cerambycidae. It was described by Quedenfeldt in 1882. It is known from Cameroon, Uganda, the Central African Republic, the Republic of the Congo, the Democratic Republic of the Congo, Angola, and Zambia.
