= Coléoptères =

- Discipline: Entomology
- Language: French

Publication details
- History: 1995-present
- Publisher: Roger-Paul Dechambre (France)

Standard abbreviations
- ISO 4: Coléoptères

Indexing
- ISSN: 1265-3357
- OCLC no.: 46630757

Links
- Journal homepage

Coléoptères is a French-language scientific journal of entomology, focusing on Coleoptera only.

== History ==
Following the cessation of publication of the Bulletin de la Société Sciences Nat in 1995, the journals Coléoptères and Besoiro were founded to accommodate some of the manuscripts that would have gone to the older journal.

== Authors ==
At the beginning, several authors published in the journal, but now only some specialists do, mainly Philippe Antoine (Cetoniinae), Roger-Paul Dechambre (Dynastinae), Thierry Deuve (Carabidae), Gérard Tavakilian (Cerambycidae), and Marc Lacroix (Melolonthinae).

== Composition and production ==
Each number follows some rules about presentation and contains only one work. Black-and-white figures, but also many colour photographs, illustrate the publications. The size of the journal is A5; it is produced by photocopying. There is no regular periodicity, a new issue is published when a new work is accepted by the editorial board. Each issue is produced at about hundred copies, of which many are sent to beetle specialists, and about 50 copies are made available for sale. When an issue is exhausted, a reissue is done.
