= Rhabdotis picta =

Scientific classification
- Kingdom: Animalia
- Phylum: Arthropoda
- Class: Insecta
- Order: Coleoptera
- Suborder: Polyphaga
- Infraorder: Scarabaeiformia
- Family: Scarabaeidae
- Genus: Rhabdotis
- Species: R. picta

Binomial name
- Rhabdotis picta (Burmeister, 1847)

Species of beetle

Rhabdotis picta is a species of Scarabaeidae, the dung beetle family. It was described by Hermann Burmeister in 1847.
