= Hillside Books, Canterbury =

Hillside Books, Canterbury was a publisher specialising in books on entomology and small equipment associated with this science.

== Origin ==
It was established in 1989, directed by Lydie Leforestier.

Initially it was in Canterbury, England but then moved within the region to Lindfield, West Sussex.

== Activities ==
The company vetted and stocked about 25,000 titles - stated to include the larger share of entomological literature of the world. Hillside works for the specialist included:

- The Beetles of the World volumes 25 to 30 and supplements;
- the continuation of the work of Jean-Claude Weiss: The Parnassiinae of the world parts 3 and 4
- The Monograph of the genus Morpho part 3, by Patrick Blandin.

They were the only distributors of the entomological journals Besoiro and Coléoptères.

Equipment included continental entomological insect pins and mounting cards (widely used by entomologists in other parts of Europe but not in U.K.).

== Closing ==
In June 2011 termination of activity saw Erich Bauer, Goecke & Evers Germany instead continue publishing the books of Jean-Claude Weiss, and to sell its remaining stock of the literature.
