= Besoiro =

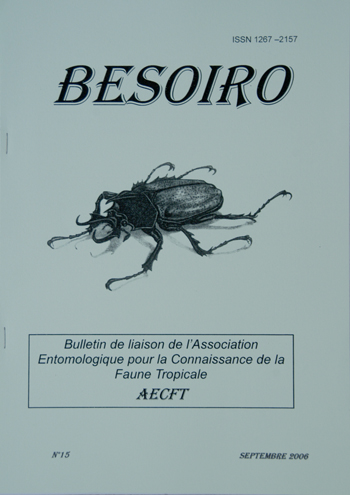
- Discipline: Entomology
- Language: French

Publication details
- History: 1995–present
- Publisher: Patrick Arnaud (France)

Standard abbreviations
- ISO 4: Besoiro

Indexing
- ISSN: 1267-2157
- OCLC no.: 477589226

Besoiro is a French entomological scientific journal. It is published by Patrick Arnaud and was established in 1995. The name means beetle in Portuguese. The taxa described are included in the Zoological Record.

Following the cessation of publication of the Bulletin de la Société Sciences Nat in 1995, the journals Besoiro and Coléoptères were founded to accommodate some of the manuscripts that would have gone to the older journal.

== Authors ==
The authors are amateur entomologists from different countries: Canada, Costa-Rica, France, Japan, Madagascar, Venezuela, West Indies. They are mainly Patrick Arnaud (Cetoniinae, Lucanidae and Scarabaeidae), Hugues Bomans (Lucanidae), Tetsuo Miyashita (Dynastinae and Lucanidae), Marc Soula (Rutelinae). Lydie Arnaud described several new Membracidae. The journal is not peer-reviewed.

== Composition and production ==
Each volume contains one or several works. Black and white figures and colour photographs illustrate the publications. The bulletin is produced on A4 paper (21 x 29.7 cm). They are produced by ink jet, as this might last longer than laser photocopies. Each issue is produced at about 50 copies, of which some are sent to beetle specialists and about 20 copies are made available for sale. When an issue is exhausted, a reissue is produced.

== New taxa ==
In the first 19 issues, a total of about 100 new taxa were described in this journal.
