= Sciences Nat =

French publisher specializing in entomology

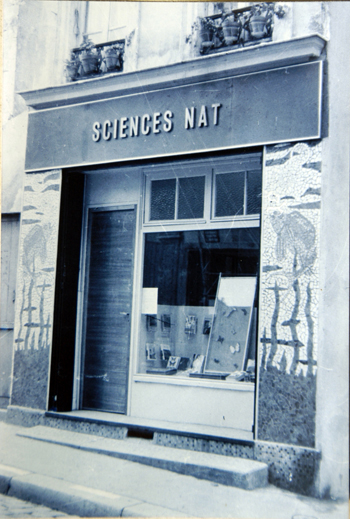
Sciences Nat, 86 rue de la Mare, Paris, in 1971

Sciences Nat was the academic publisher specialising in entomology of the Societé Sciences Nat. The society was established in 1971 and based in the rue de la Mare in Paris. Three years later it moved to the rue des Alouettes and later to Venette near Compiègne. The company was directed first by Roger Ehrman and then by Jacques Rigout.

In 1981 the publication of The Beetles of the World started, a series of 30 volumes devoted to the Coleoptera. The 24 first were published by Sciences Nat, the later ones by Hillside Books, Canterbury.

Sciences Nat also published several entomological monographs, mainly in English, such as:

- The Parnassiinae of the World, Jean-Claude Weiss. The first 2 parts published by Sciences Nat, the parts 3 and 4 by Hillside Books, Canterbury, the 5th part by Goecke & Evers, Germany.
- The genus Morpho, Patrick Blandin. The first 2 parts published by Sciences Nat, the remaining by Hillside Books, Canterbury.
- Heliconius and related genera, Helmuth and Ruth Holzinger.
- The genus Agrias, Paul Barselou
- The genus Perisama, Stéphane Attal and Alain Crosson du Cormier

Between 1972 and 1995, Sciences Nat also published the journal Bulletin de la Société Sciences Nat, in which a history of Sciences Nat was given in a 1992 interview with Rigout. Between 1982 and 1988 Sciences Nat published three volumes of the journal Miscellanea Entomologica.
