= Roger-Paul Dechambre =

French veterinarian and entomologist

- Born: 1935
- Died: November 9, 2016 (aged 80–81)
- Education: École nationale vétérinaire d'Alfort; Université Pierre-et-Marie-Curie
- Scientific career
- Fields: Entomology
- Workplaces: Museum National d'Histoire Naturelle, Paris
- Theses: Aspects Primitifs De L’Elevage Du Mouton (1960); Effet de groupe et évolution des tumeurs ascitiques chez la souris (1970)
- Author abbrev. (botany): Dechambre

Roger-Paul Dechambre (1935 – 8 November 2016) was a French veterinarian and entomologist .

== Career ==
Dechambre attended lhe École nationale vétérinaire d'Alfort, in 1960 gaining a doctorate on the thesis Aspects Primitifs De L’Elevage Du Mouton . He continued his studies at the Université Pierre-et-Marie-Curie at Paris, gaining in 1970 a doctorate on the thesis Effet de groupe et évolution des tumeurs ascitiques chez la souris .

Roger-Paul Dechambre was the curator at the Museum National d'Histoire Naturelle, Paris à Paris. He produced substantial work on the beetle family Dynastinae.

== Publications (extract) ==
Most of Dechambre's publications are on the subfamily Dynastinae.

- R.-P. Dechambre; Lachaume, Gilbert (1992). Dynastidae américains : Cyclocephalini, Agaocephalini, Pentodontini, Oryctini, Phileurini (in French and English). Translated by Launay, Julee. Venette : Sciences nat. ISBN 2-85724-055-4.
- Gilbert Lachaume (1992). Dynastidae américains. (Les Coléoptères du monde (in French and English). Vol. 14. Translated by Launay, Julee. Venette France Sciences Nat.
- Roger-Paul Dechambre (2005). Dynastidae (Texte imprimé) : Dynastidae australiens et océaniens = australian and oceanian Dynastidae (in French and English). Translated by Morris, Brian. Canterbury: Hillside Books.
- Roger-Paul Dechambre; Gilbert Lachaume (2001). Dynastidae (Texte imprimé): Le genre Oryctes (in French and English). Translated by Morris, Brian. Compiègne: Hillside books.
- Roger-Paul Dechambre (1986). Faune de Madagascar 65, Insectes Coléoptères Dynastidae. Paris: Muséum national d'histoire naturelle.
- Roger-Paul Dechambre (1970). Effet de groupe et évolution des tumeurs ascitiques chez la souris. Paris.
- Roger-Paul Dechambre (2005). Dynastidae : Dynastidae australiens et océaniens - australian and oceanian Dynastidae (in French and English). Translated by Morris, Brian. Canterbury: Hillside Books.
- Roger-Paul Dechambre; Gilbert Lachaume (2001). Dynastidae (Texte imprimé): Le genre Oryctes (in French and English). Translated by Morris, Brian. Compiègne: Hillside books.

== Described species ==
- Golofa globulicornis (1975)
- Golofa obliquicornis (1975)
- Golofa spatha (1989)
- Hemicyrthus chazeaui (1982)
- Hemicyrthus costatus (1982)
- Hemicyrthus elongatus (1982)
- Hemicyrthus gutierrezi (1982)
- Paroryctoderus cornutus (1994)
