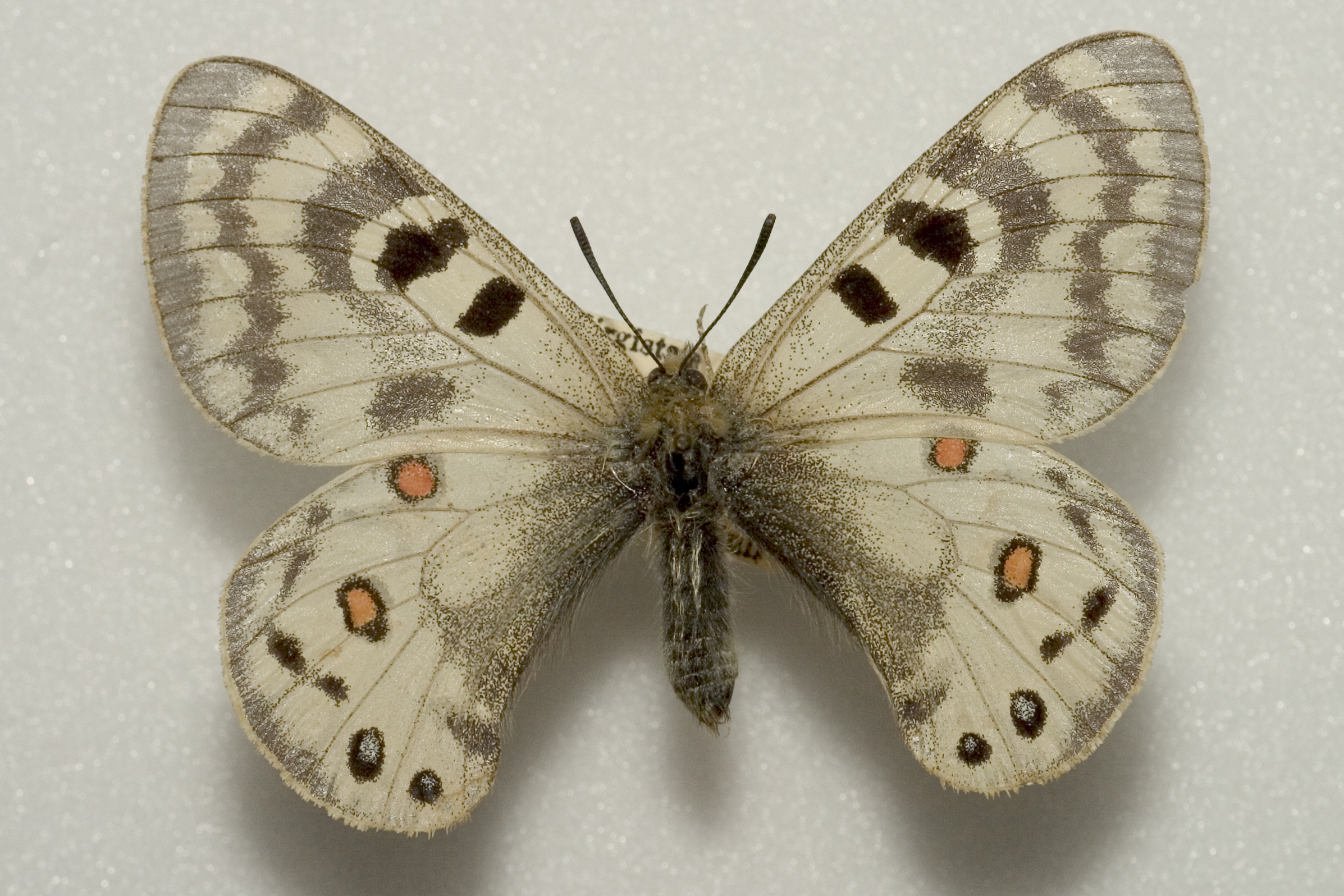
- Parnassius delphius maximinus, male from Kyrgyzstan

Scientific classification
- Kingdom: Animalia
- Phylum: Arthropoda
- Class: Insecta
- Order: Lepidoptera
- Family: Papilionidae
- Genus: Parnassius
- Species: P. delphius

Binomial name
- Parnassius delphius Eversmann, 1843

= Parnassius delphius =

Banded Apollo

Species of butterfly

Parnassius delphius, the banded Apollo, is a high-altitude butterfly which is found in Central Asia. It is a member of the genus Parnassius of the swallowtail family, Papilionidae.

== Description ==
Note: The wing pattern in Parnassius species is inconsistent and the very many subspecies and forms make identification problematic and uncertain. Structural characters derived from the genitalia, wing venation, sphragis and foretibial epiphysis are more, but not entirely reliable. The description given here is a guide only. For an identification key see Ackery P.R. (1975).

Discal markings dull, submarginal band of forewing distinct, hindmarginal spot absent as a rule; ocelli of hindwing bright carmine, hindmarginal spots black, blackish hindmarginal area broad, two bluish-black anal spots, a faint submarginal and narrow marginal band.

== Range ==
Northern Pakistan, Afghanistan, Tajikistan, Kyrgyzstan, Uzbekistan and Kazakhstan.

== Status ==
Widely distributed. Locally common, generally rare. Not known to be threatened. Requires further research. Protected by law in India. Featured in erstwhile USSR Red Data Book as vulnerable.

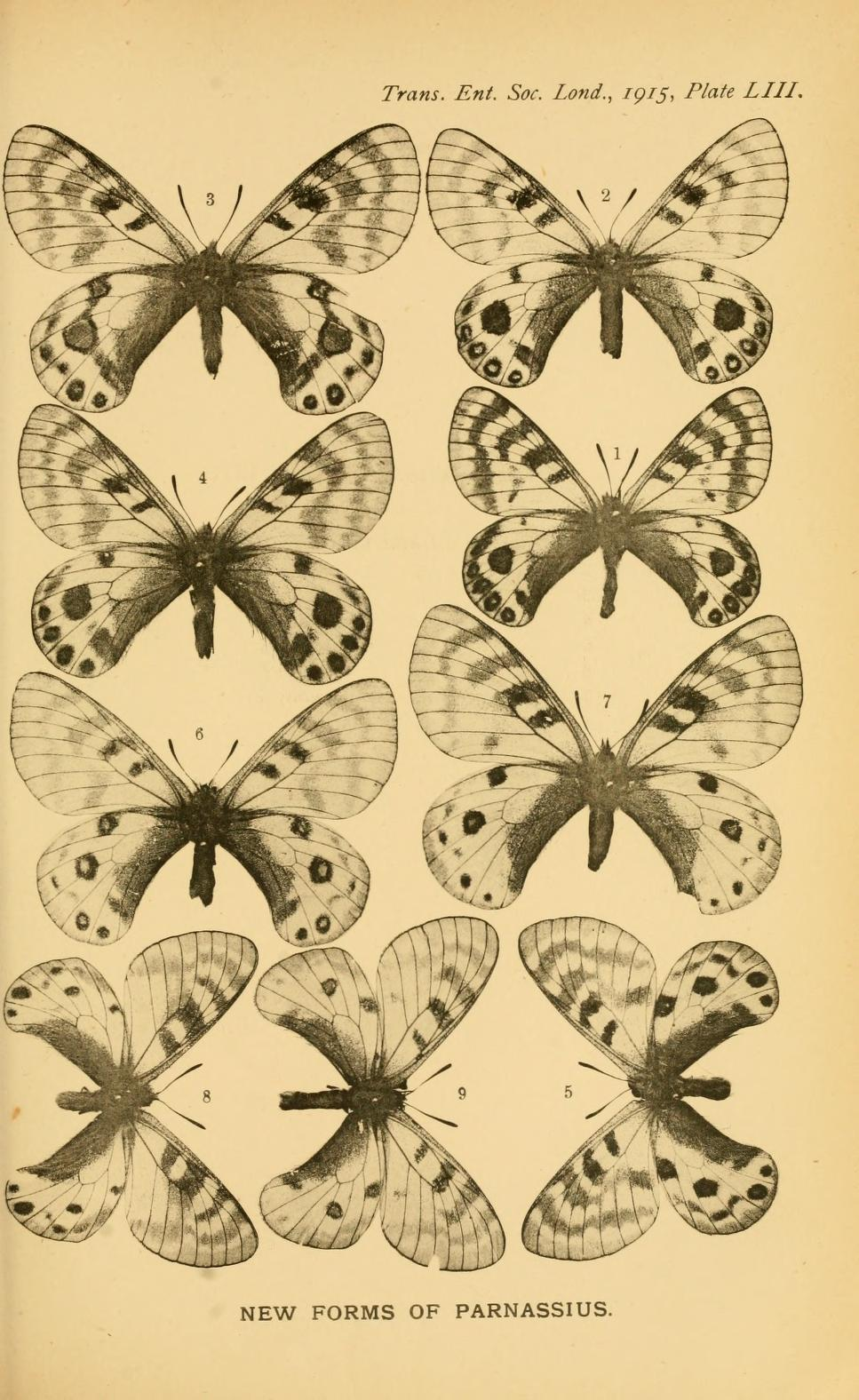
Four subspecies of P. delphius

== Subspecies ==
There are up to 44 subspecies.

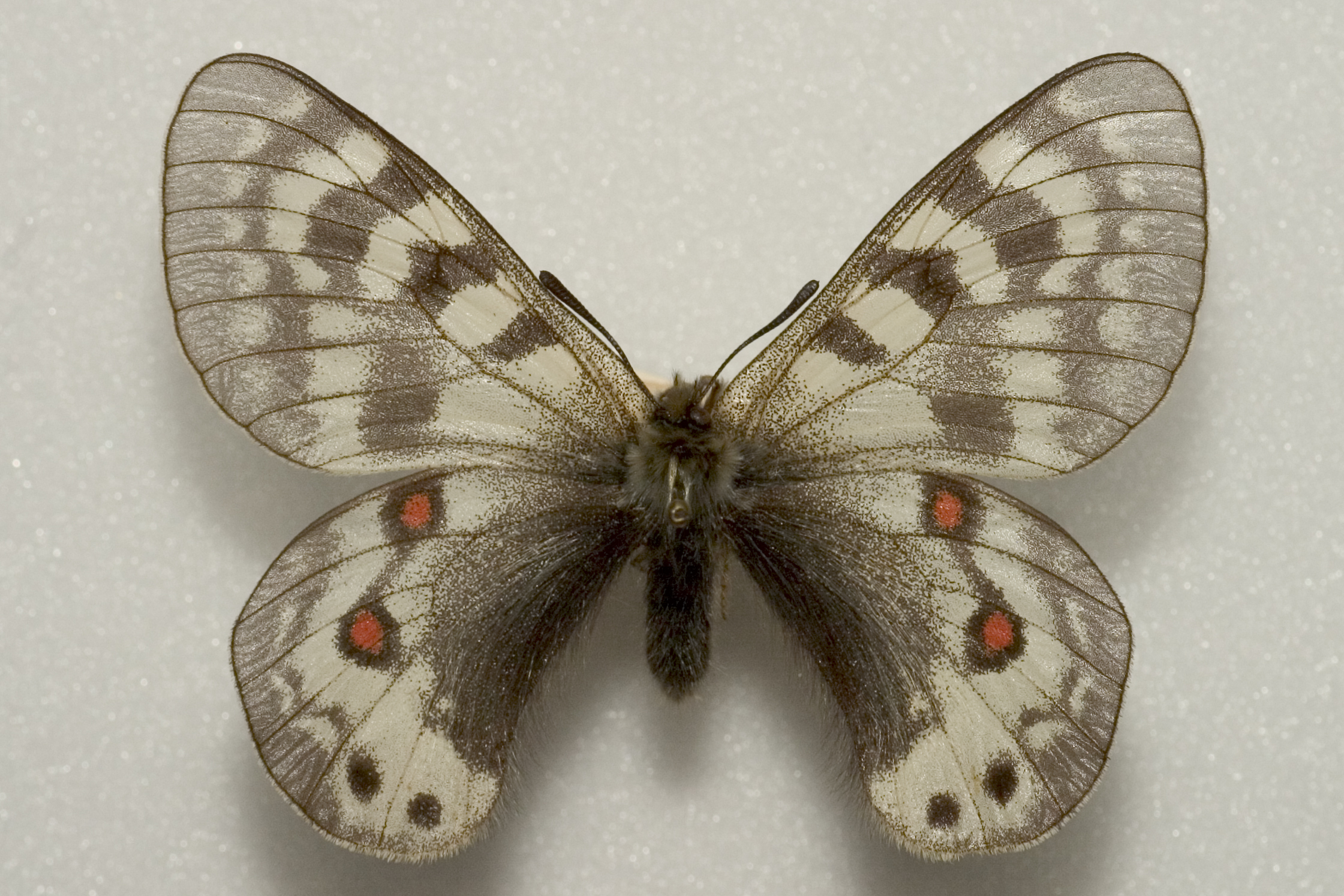
Parnassius delphius infernalis, male from the Alai Mountains

== See also ==
- Papilionidae
- List of butterflies of India
- List of butterflies of India (Papilionidae)
