= Venette =

- Commune
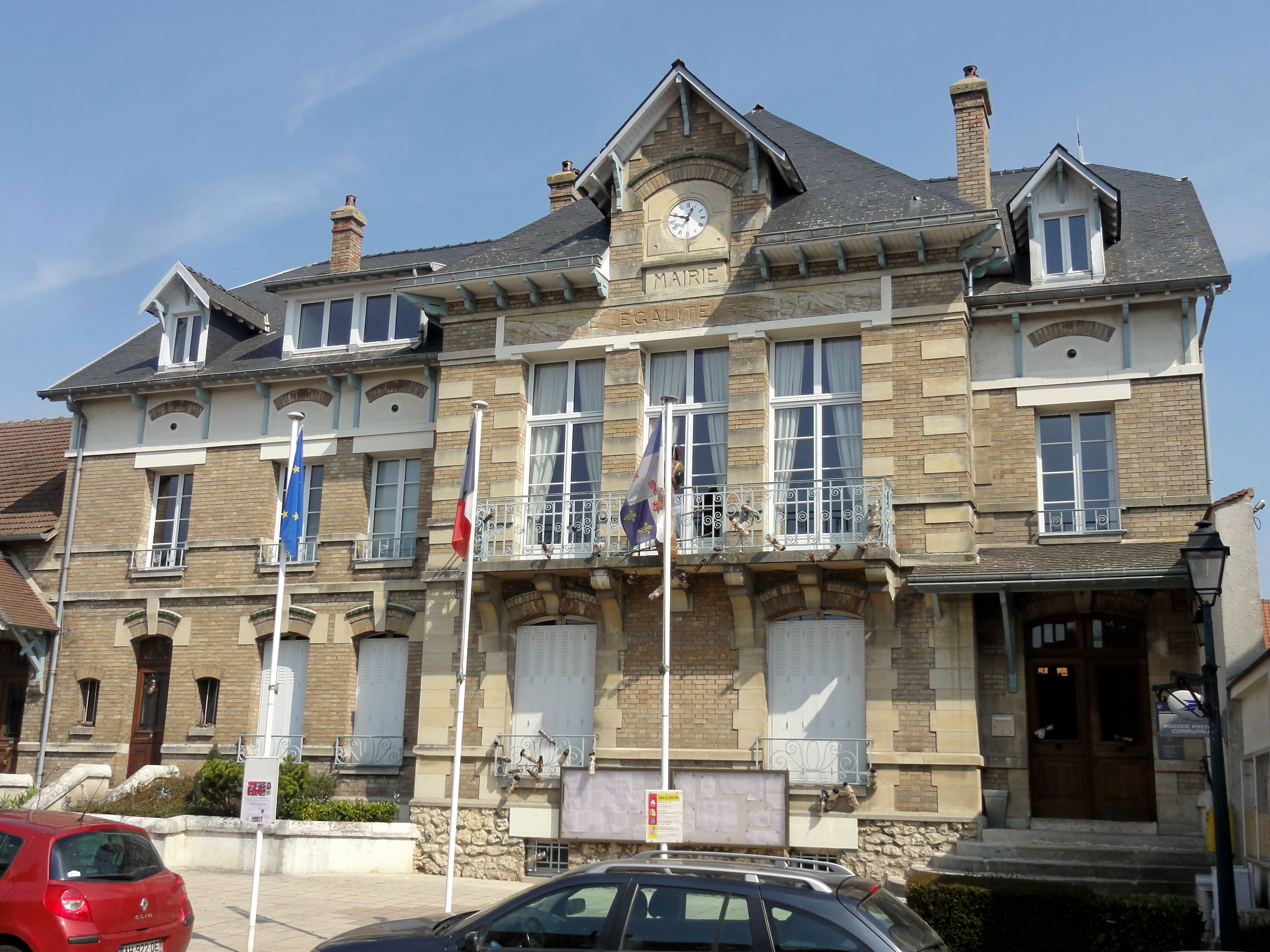
- The town hall in Venette
- Location of Venette
- Location within France Location within Hauts-de-France
- Coordinates: 49°24′59″N 2°48′02″E
- Country: France
- Region: Hauts-de-France
- Department: Oise
- Arrondissement: Compiègne
- Canton: Compiègne-2
- Intercommunality: CA Région de Compiègne et Basse Automne

Government
  - Mayor (2020–2026): Romuald Seels
- Area^{1}: 8.45 km^{2} (3.26 sq mi)
- Elevation: 34 m (112 ft)
- Highest elevation: 86 m (282 ft)
- Lowest elevation: 31 m (102 ft)
- Population (2023): 2,758
  - Density: 326/km^{2} (845/sq mi)
- Time zone: UTC+01:00 (CET)
  - Summer (DST): UTC+02:00 (CEST)
- INSEE/Postal code: 60665 /60280
- ^{1} French Land Register data, which excludes lakes, ponds, glaciers > 1 km^{2} (0.386 sq mi or 247 acres) and river estuaries.

Venette (French pronunciation: [vənɛt]) is a commune in the Oise department in northern France. The town is located along the river Oise, near Compiègne.

== Population ==
Historical population
Year	Pop.	±% p.a.
1968	2,173	—
1975	2,022	−1.02%
1982	2,002	−0.14%
1990	2,400	+2.29%
1999	2,674	+1.21%
2007	2,701	+0.13%
2012	2,792	+0.66%
2017	2,857	+0.46%
2023	2,758	−0.59%
Source: INSEE

Its inhabitants are called Venettiens in French.

== See also ==
- Communes of the Oise department
