= Bulletin de la Société Sciences Nat =

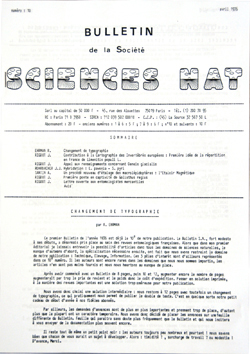
- Discipline: Entomology
- Language: French

Publication details
- History: 1972–1995
- Publisher: Sciences Nat (France)

Standard abbreviations
- ISO 4: Bull. Soc. Sci. Nat

Indexing
- ISSN: 0249-5805
- OCLC no.: 477589226

The Bulletin de la Société Sciences Nat was a French entomological scientific journal. It was published by Sciences Nat and established in 1972.

== History ==
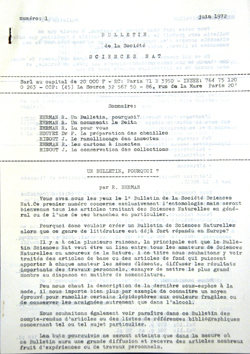
Cover of the first issue

Initially, the Bulletin was sent free of charge to French entomologists. Starting in 1975, a small contribution was asked and more than 400 subscriptions were received, increasing to 450 in 1977. In 1978 there were 610 subscribers, of which 550 in France; the number increased to 670 the next year. From then on the circulation varied between 650 and 950. The last issue published was #83 in 1995.

== Production ==
The journal was originally simply typed and printed by Sciences Nat on a small stencil duplicating machine which was rotated by hand with a crank. From 1974, it was produced by photocopying on a Rank Xerox machine. In 1977, a small Gestetner duplicator was obtained. During this time, pages were simply stapled together. From 1978 the typing was done on a Varityper which made it necessary to type the whole text twice. In 1979 a more advanced offset printer allowed colours printing for the first time. In 1980, eight colour plates were produced which placed it at the head of entomological journals worldwide judged by quality of the illustrations. From 1984, the Bulletin was printed by a professional company. Each issue had from eight (first issue) to sixty pages (double issue 75–76). Some errors also occurred: all pages of issue 80 are marked 79. Nearly all the articles were written in French, nearly all with figures, and (after 1980) most of them with colour photos.

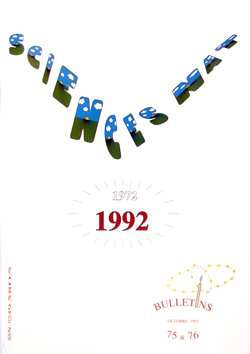
Twentieth anniversary "bubbles" issue

== Authors ==
During the first 20 years, more than 150 different authors published a variety of new species in the journal. Some notable authors were the coleopterists Vincent Allard (Cetoniidae), Jean-Pierre Lacroix (Lucanidae), P. Arnaud (Cetoniidae), R.-P. Dechambre (Dynastidae), Th. Deuve (Carabidae), P. Bleuzen (Buprestidae), H. Bohmans (Lucanidae), J. Rigout (Cetoniidae), and P. Téocchi (Lamiinae) and the lepidopterists Claude Herbulot (Geometridae), Ph. Darge (Charaxinae), B. Turlin (Charaxinae), G. Deslisle (Papilionidae), J. Haxaire (Sphingidae), Gilles Terral (Saturniidae), Hervé de Toulgoët (Arctiidae), and J.-C. Weiss (Parnassiinae)

== See also ==
- List of taxa published in Bulletin de la Société Sciences Nat
