= P. tridentata =

P. tridentata may refer to:

- Pachnoda tridentata, a species of beetle
- Plectorrhiza tridentata, a species orchid
- Pleuromeris tridentata, a species of mollusc
- Polymorphomyia tridentata, a species of fly
- Purshia tridentata, a species of shrub
