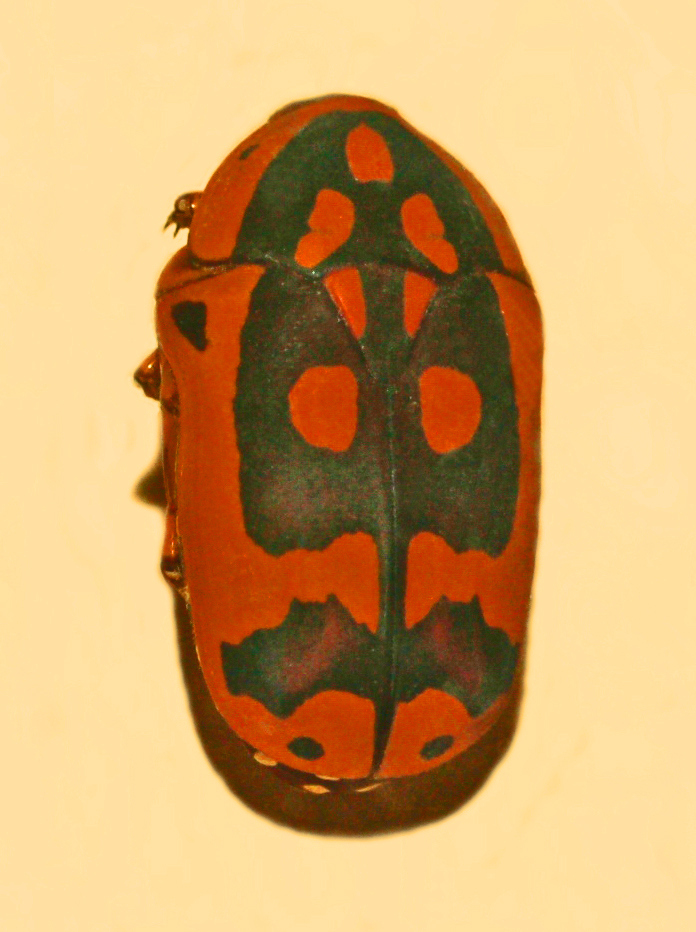
- Pachnoda sinuata flavivenris from Uganda. Museum specimen

Scientific classification
- Kingdom: Animalia
- Phylum: Arthropoda
- Class: Insecta
- Order: Coleoptera
- Suborder: Polyphaga
- Infraorder: Scarabaeiformia
- Family: Scarabaeidae
- Genus: Pachnoda
- Species: P. sinuata
- Subspecies: P. s. flaviventris

Trinomial name
- Pachnoda sinuata flaviventris (Gory & Percheron, 1833)

= Pachnoda sinuata flaviventris =

Subspecies of beetle

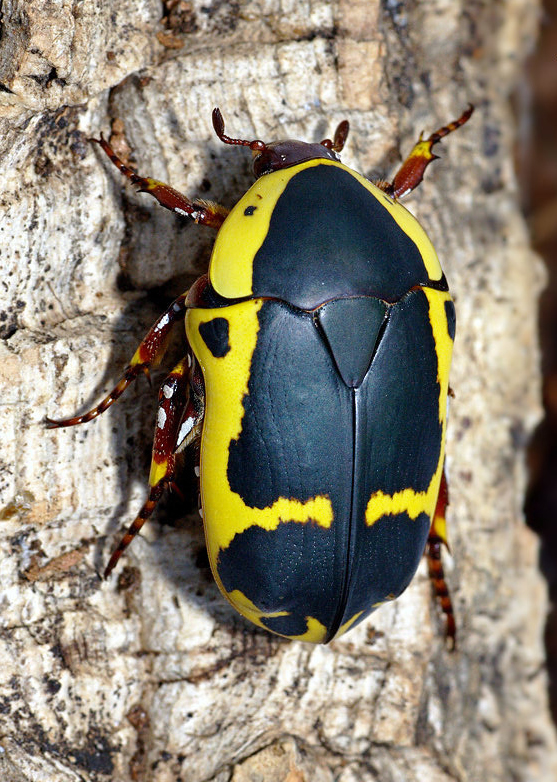
Pachnoda sinuata flavivenris from Tanzania

Pachnoda sinuata flaviventris, the garden fruit chafer, is a subspecies of beetle belonging to the family Scarabaeidae.

== Description ==
Pachnoda sinuata flaviventris can reach a length of about 20–25 millimetres (0.79–0.98 in). Elytra are usually yellow or red, with a complex black pattern of markings. This subspecies shows a great variability of habitus. It is very similar to Pachnoda trimaculata. It can be distinguished on the basis of the analysis of the reproductive system of the male.

These beetles are diurnal. Adults feed on fruits, while larvae feed on humus and fruits.

== Distribution ==
This subspecies can be found in Democratic Republic of the Congo, Uganda, Tanzania, Zambia, Ethiopia and South Africa.
