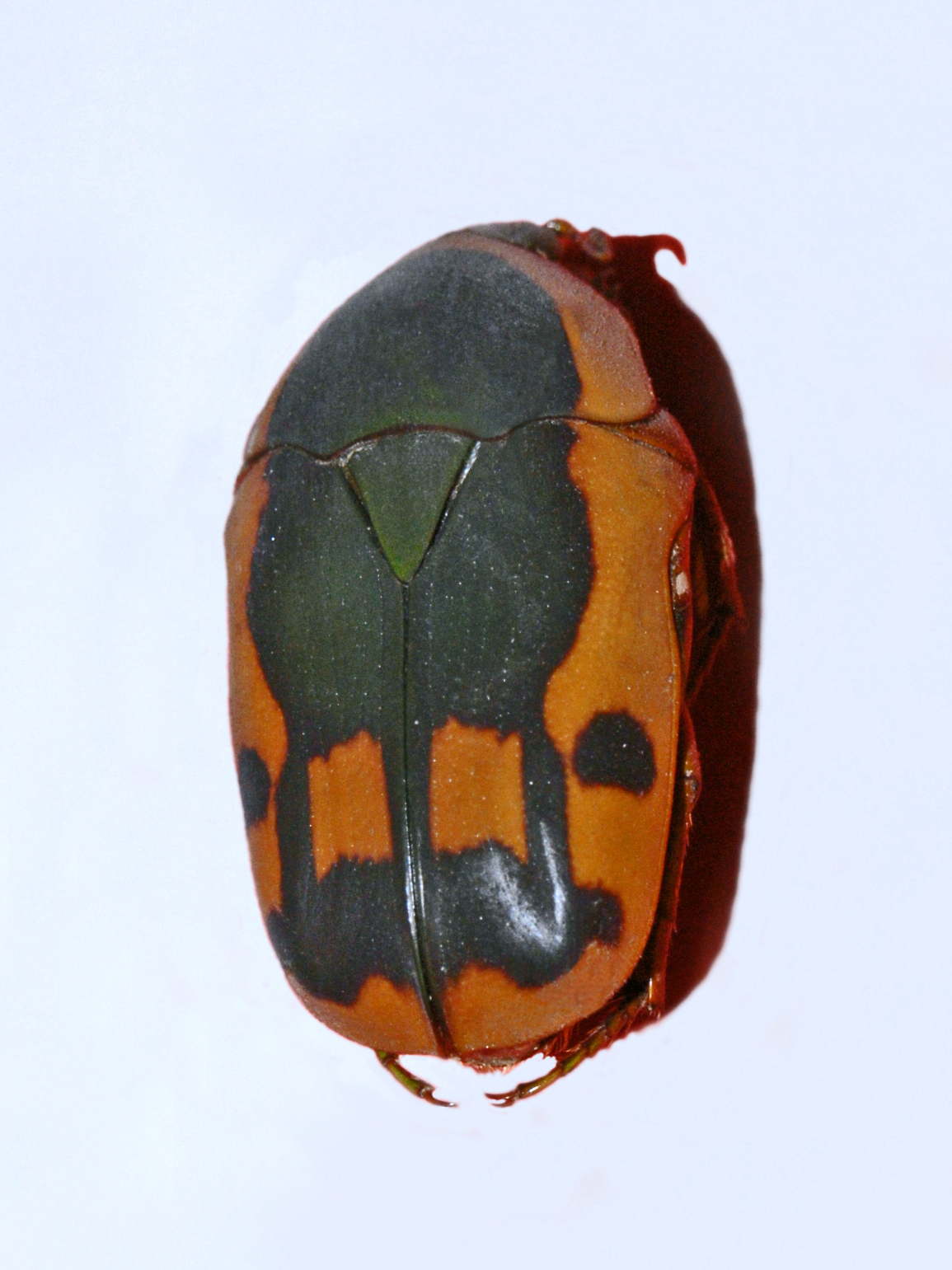
- Museum specimen of Pachnoda impressa

Scientific classification
- Domain: Eukaryota
- Kingdom: Animalia
- Phylum: Arthropoda
- Class: Insecta
- Order: Coleoptera
- Suborder: Polyphaga
- Infraorder: Scarabaeiformia
- Family: Scarabaeidae
- Genus: Pachnoda
- Species: P. impressa

Binomial name
- Pachnoda impressa (Goldfuss, 1805)

Synonyms
- Conostethus impressus; Pachnodella impressa; Marmylida (Pachnodella) impressa

= Pachnoda impressa =

Species of beetle

Pachnoda impressa, the green and yellow fruit chafer, is a species of beetles of the family Scarabaeidae and subfamily Cetoniinae.

== Description ==
Pachnoda impressa can reach a body length of about 20–25 millimetres (0.79–0.98 in). Basic color is greenish-brown, with yellow-orange markings on the elytra.

== Distribution ==
This species can be found in Malawi, South Africa, Zambia and Tanzania. It is quite common in the equatorial African bush.
