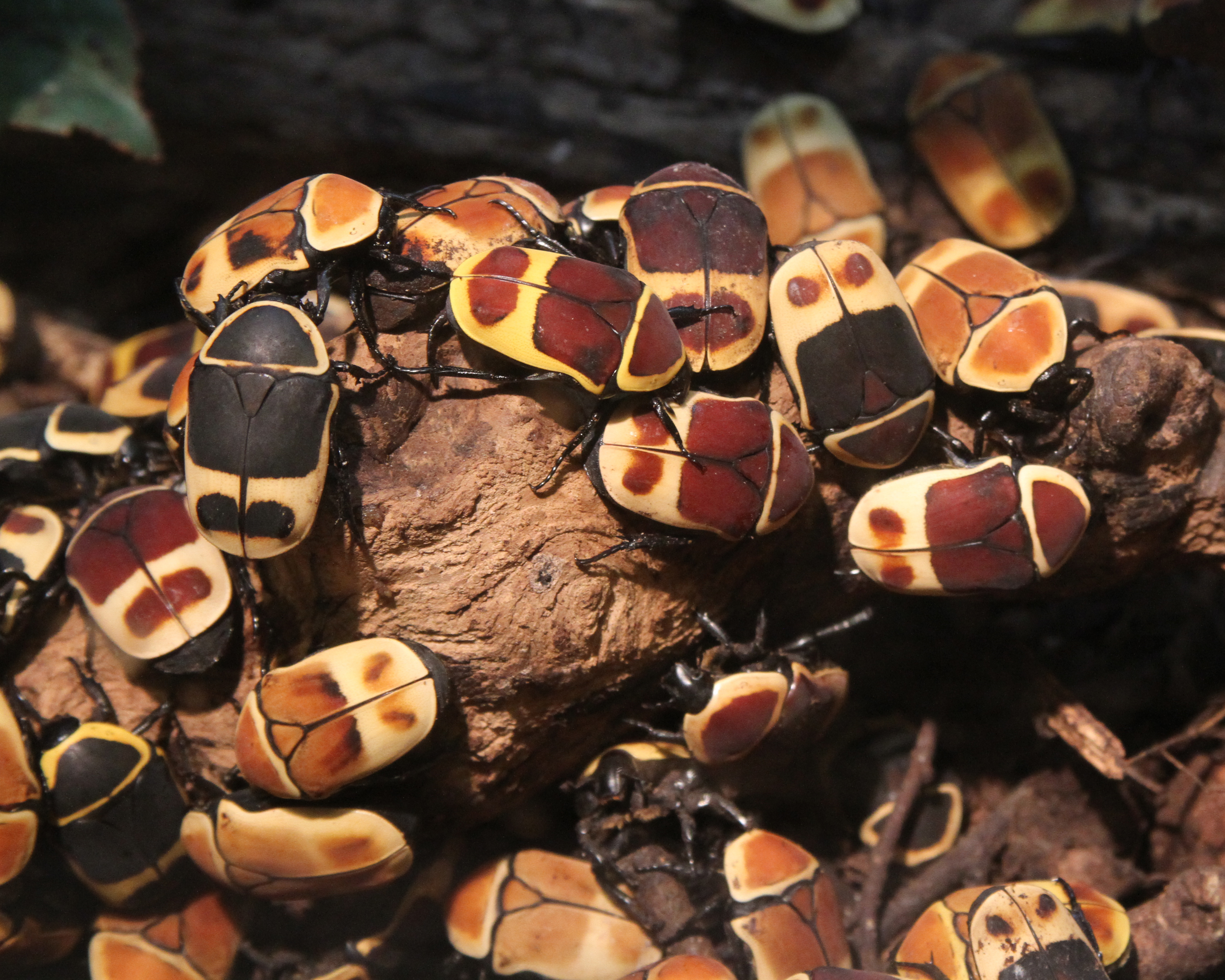

Scientific classification
- Kingdom: Animalia
- Phylum: Arthropoda
- Clade: Pancrustacea
- Class: Insecta
- Order: Coleoptera
- Suborder: Polyphaga
- Infraorder: Scarabaeiformia
- Family: Scarabaeidae
- Genus: Pachnoda
- Species: P. marginata

Binomial name
- Pachnoda marginata (Drury, 1773)

Subspecies
- See text

= Pachnoda marginata =

Species of beetle

Pachnoda marginata is a beetle from the subfamily Cetoniinae with a large number of subspecies that lives in west and central Africa. They are sometimes used as food for terrarium animals. The adult beetles are 20–30 mm, the larvae are very small when they hatch, but can grow as long as 60 mm. (2.36 in.) It is commonly called the sun beetle or Congo chafer beetle.

== Description ==
The sun beetle comes in nine subspecies, the three common ones are: Pachnoda marginata aurantia, Pachnoda marginata marginata, Pachnoda marginata peregrina, with ranging colors. Pachnoda marginata aurantia comes from orange to a yellow-orange, some having a hue gradient towards the middle seen in diagram below. Pachnoda marginata marginata normally is red or crimson with little change between individuals. Pachnoda marginata peregrina, the more common amongst the subspecies, is a pale yellow or orange with brown spots; one spot being on the thorax and two spots on each elytra on each wing.

The larvae of the pachnoda can sometimes make a low snore-like noise when making their cocoons.

== List of the described subspecies ==
- Pachnoda marginata aurantia (Herbst, 1790)
- Pachnoda marginata cerandi Rigout, 1984
- Pachnoda marginata fernandezi Rigout, 1984
- Pachnoda marginata marginata (Drury, 1773)
- Pachnoda marginata mirei Ruter, 1963
- Pachnoda marginata murielae Rigout, 1987
- Pachnoda marginata perigrina Kolbe, 1906
- Pachnoda marginata rougeoti Rigout, 1992
- Pachnoda marginata tunisiensis Rigout, 1984

== Life cycle ==
After mating, the female lays an egg in moist ground, which hatches after a short time into a larva that feeds voraciously for 2 to 5 months. When the larva has matured, it pupates for several weeks, then transforms into an adult beetle, where it can live as an adult for several months.

== Gallery ==
Pachnoda marginata peregrina

Pachnoda marginata marginata

Pachnoda marginata aurantia

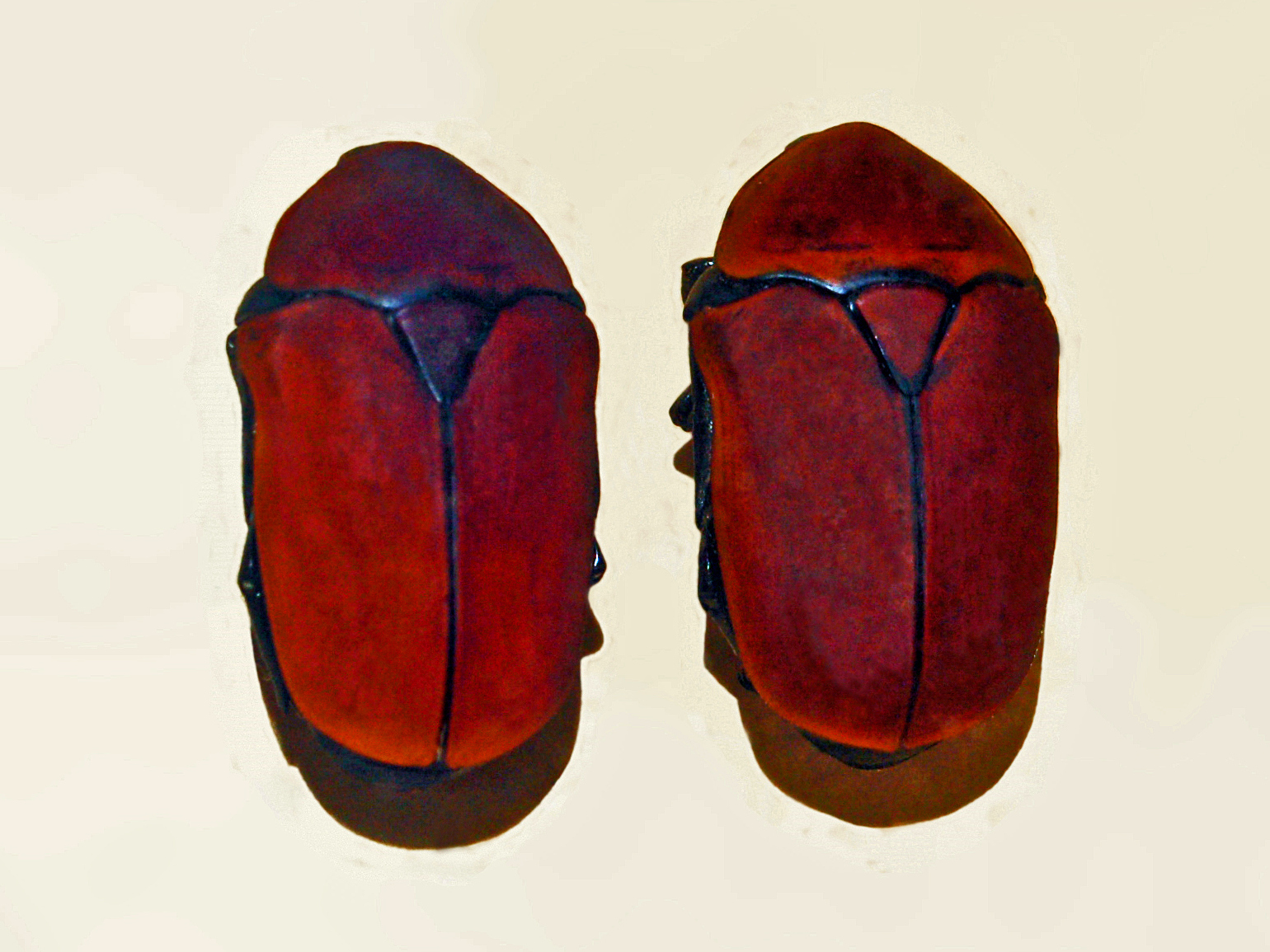
Pachnoda marginata aurantia from Guinea-Bissau. Male and female. Mounted specimen
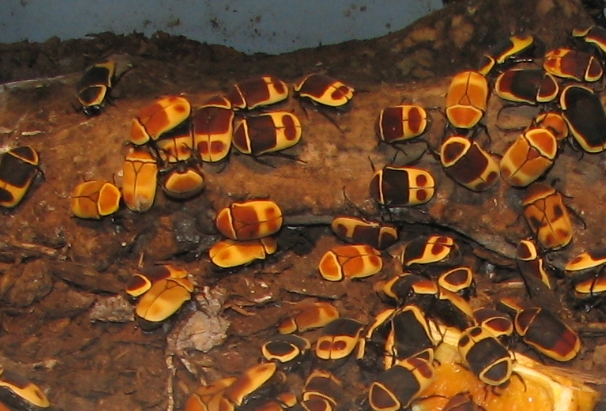
Colour variation in P. marginata

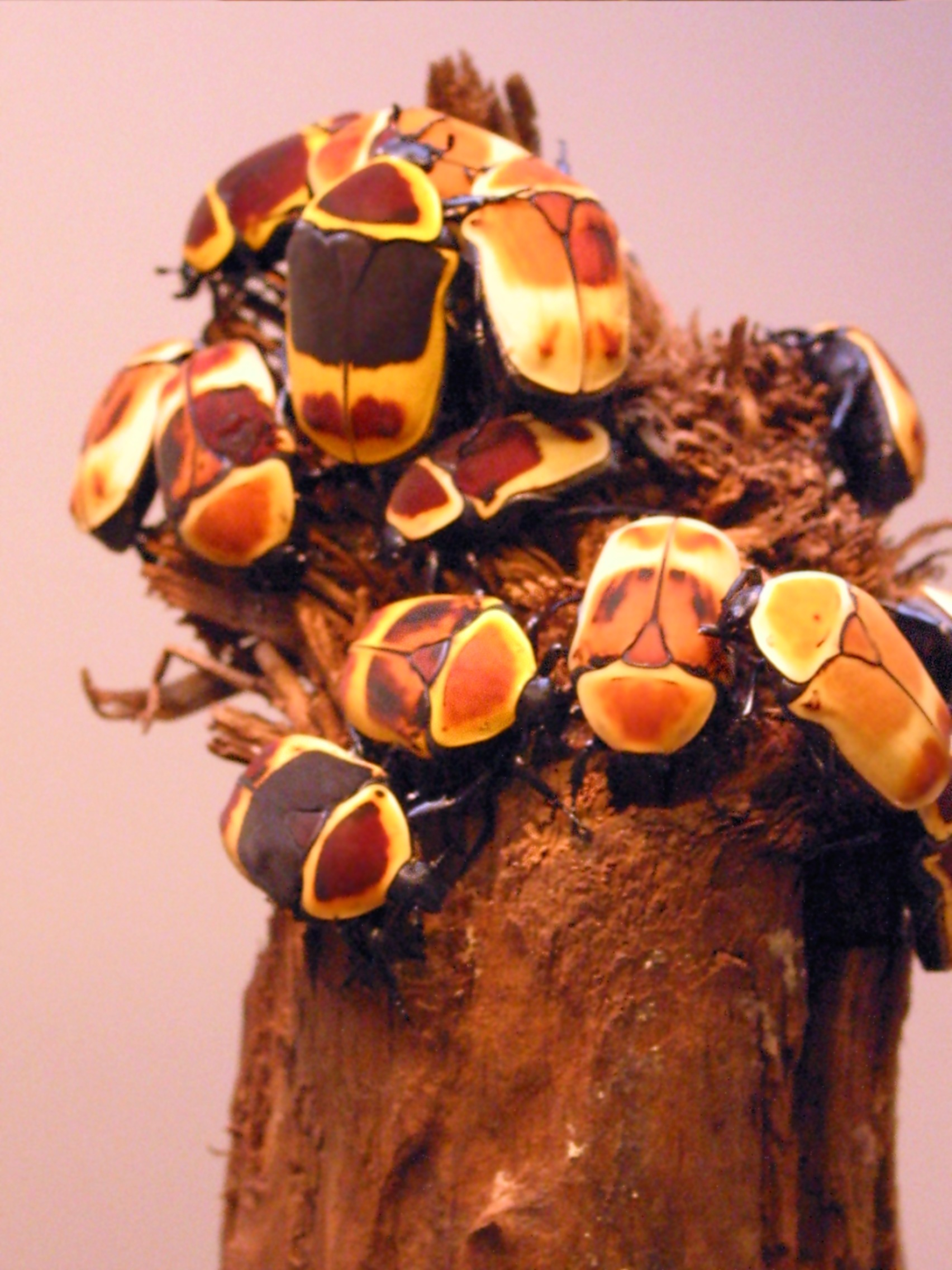
