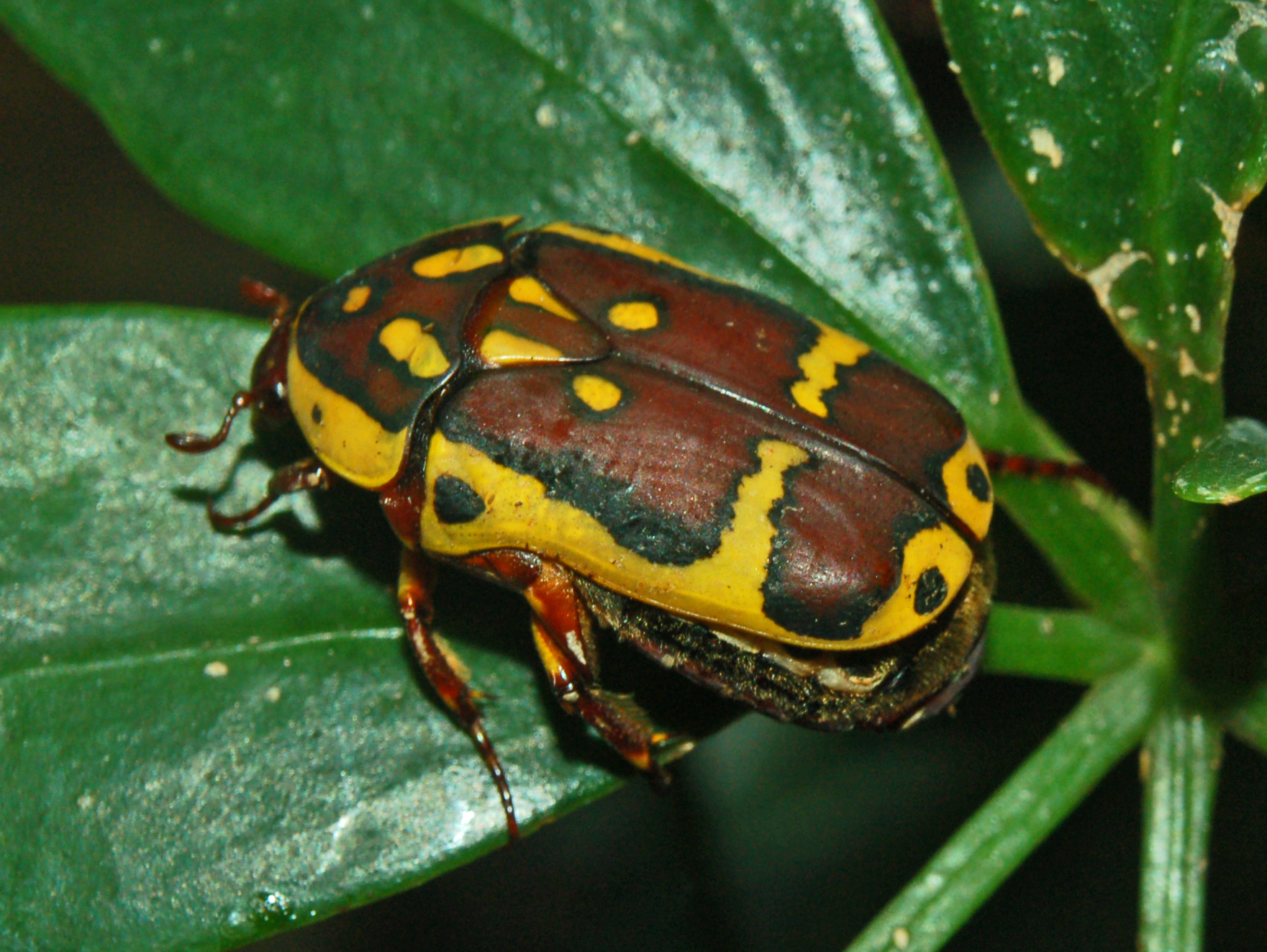
- At the Montreal Insectarium

Scientific classification
- Domain: Eukaryota
- Kingdom: Animalia
- Phylum: Arthropoda
- Class: Insecta
- Order: Coleoptera
- Suborder: Polyphaga
- Infraorder: Scarabaeiformia
- Family: Scarabaeidae
- Genus: Pachnoda
- Species: P. fissipunctum

Binomial name
- Pachnoda fissipunctum Kraatz, 1885

Synonyms
- Pachnoda aemula Bourgoin, 1919; Pachnoda fissipuncta var. aemula Bourgoin, 1919; Pachnoda flavicollis var. bipunctata Kraatz, 1885 nec Olivier, 1789; Pachnoda flavicollis var. fissipunctum Kraatz, 1885; Pachnoda sinuata puncticollis; Pachnoda fissipuncta Kraatz, 1885 (misspelling)

= Pachnoda fissipunctum =

Species of beetle

Pachnoda fissipunctum is an African scarab beetle in the subfamily Cetoniinae. It was originally described in 1885 as a variety of Pachnoda flavicollis.
