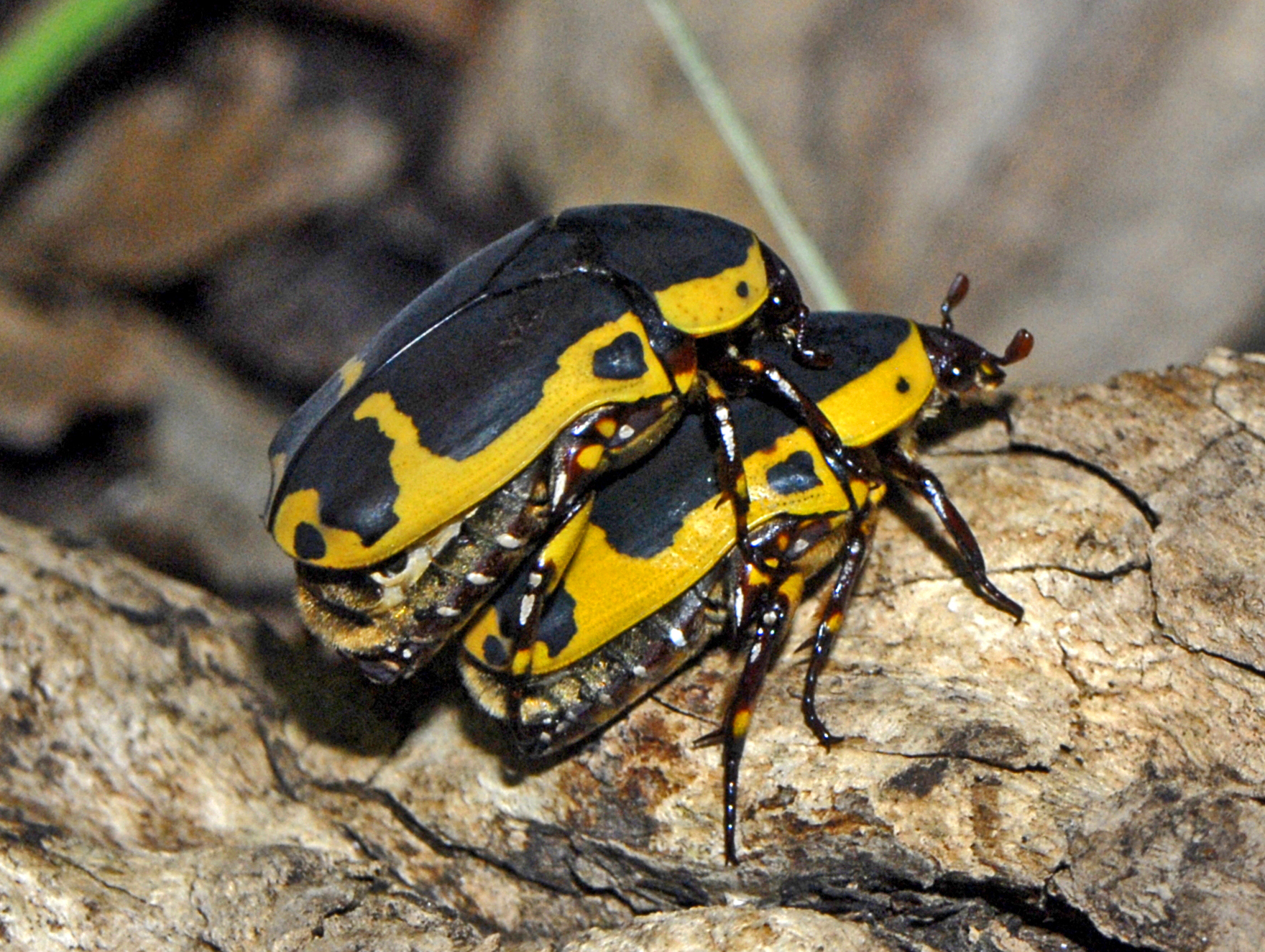
- Pachnoda sinuata at the Ménagerie du Jardin des plantes, Paris

Scientific classification
- Kingdom: Animalia
- Phylum: Arthropoda
- Clade: Pancrustacea
- Class: Insecta
- Order: Coleoptera
- Suborder: Polyphaga
- Infraorder: Scarabaeiformia
- Family: Scarabaeidae
- Genus: Pachnoda
- Species: P. sinuata

Binomial name
- Pachnoda sinuata (Fabricius, 1775)

Synonyms
- Cetonia sinuata Fabricius, 1775; Scarabaeus sinuosa Gmelin, 1790

= Pachnoda sinuata =

Species of beetle

Pachnoda sinuata, the garden fruit chafer or checkers tor or brown-and-yellow fruit chafer, is a species of beetle found in Namibia, South Africa, Ethiopia, Zimbabwe and Egypt. It is a beneficial pollinator, and a minor pest of fruits, easily recognised by its yellow patterns.

== Subspecies ==
- Pachnoda sinuata calceata Harold, 1878
- Pachnoda sinuata flaviventris (Gory & Percheron, 1833)
- Pachnoda sinuata machadoi Rigout, 1989
- Pachnoda sinuata nicolae Rigout, 1986
- Pachnoda sinuata sinuata (Fabricius, 1775)

== Identification ==
The species is part of the large family Scarabaeidae, which also include the scarabs and dung beetles. This species is large with a smooth carapace. Colouration is variable but basically yellow with dark brown central area broken by yellow spots and a transverse yellow line across the rear of the elytra.

== Diet ==
Adult beetles feed on flowers and fruit, often destroying them in the process which makes them unpopular with gardeners.

== Biology ==
This species is a popular prey species for many species of bird, such as red-winged starlings and hadada ibises.

== Habitat ==
It ranges widely in South Africa and thus are found in a variety of habitats. They are commonly found in gardens.

== Gallery ==
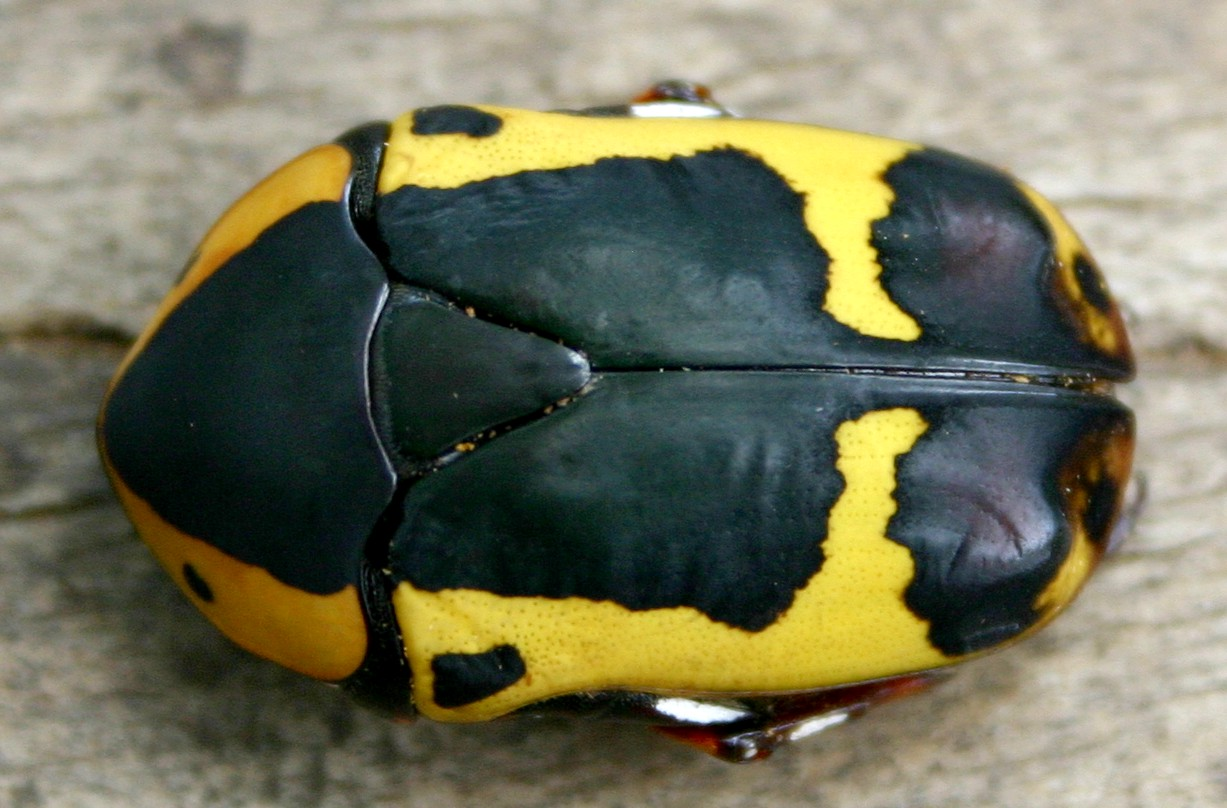
Dorsal view

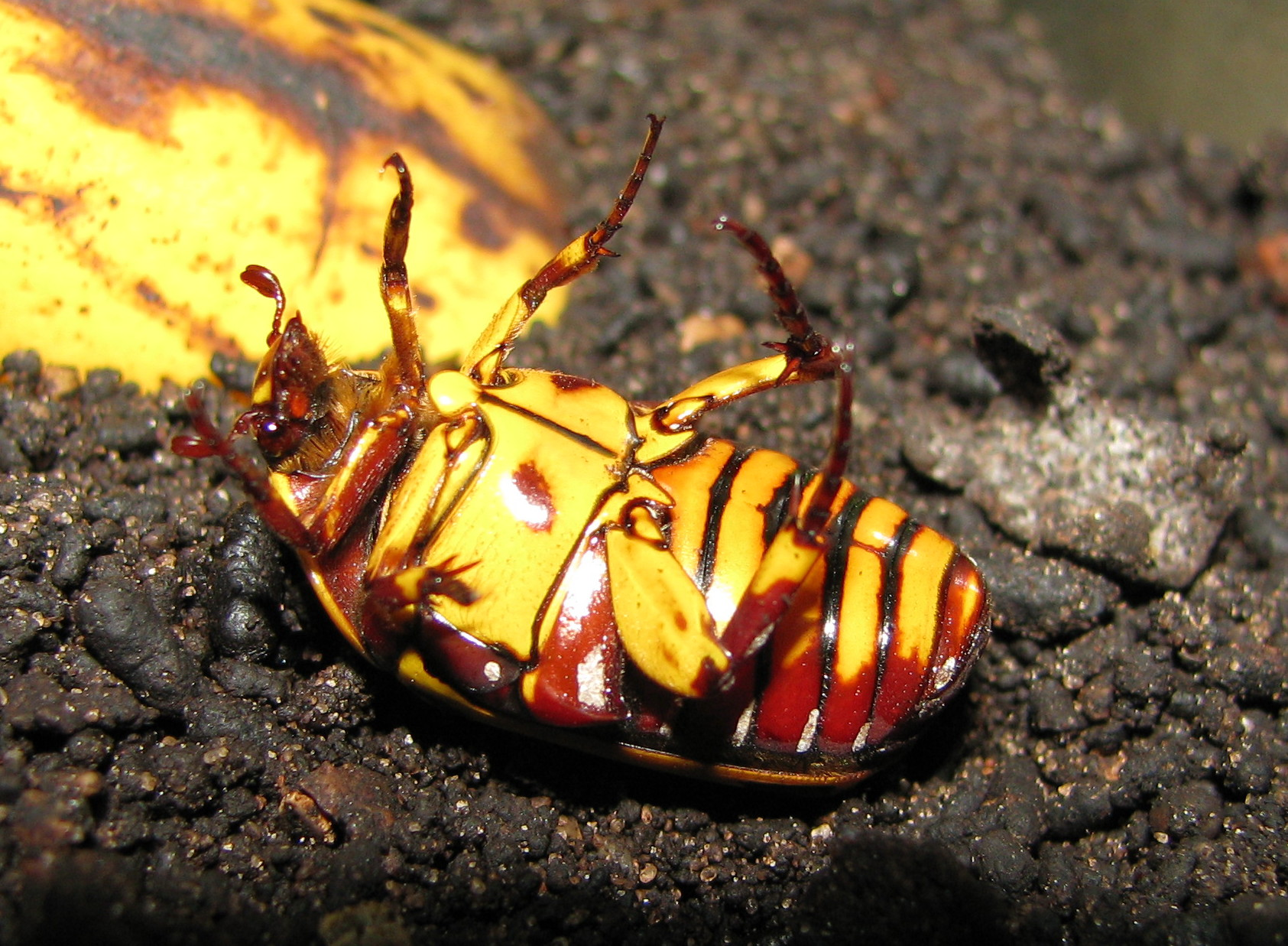
Ventral view

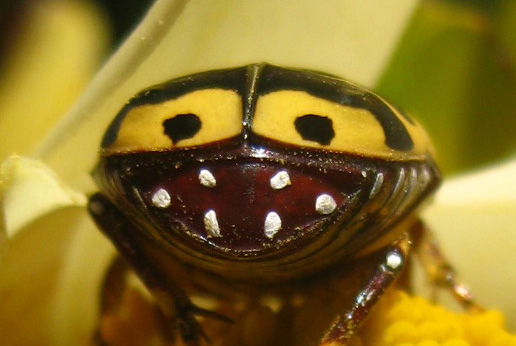
Pygidium, possibly showing animal mimicry

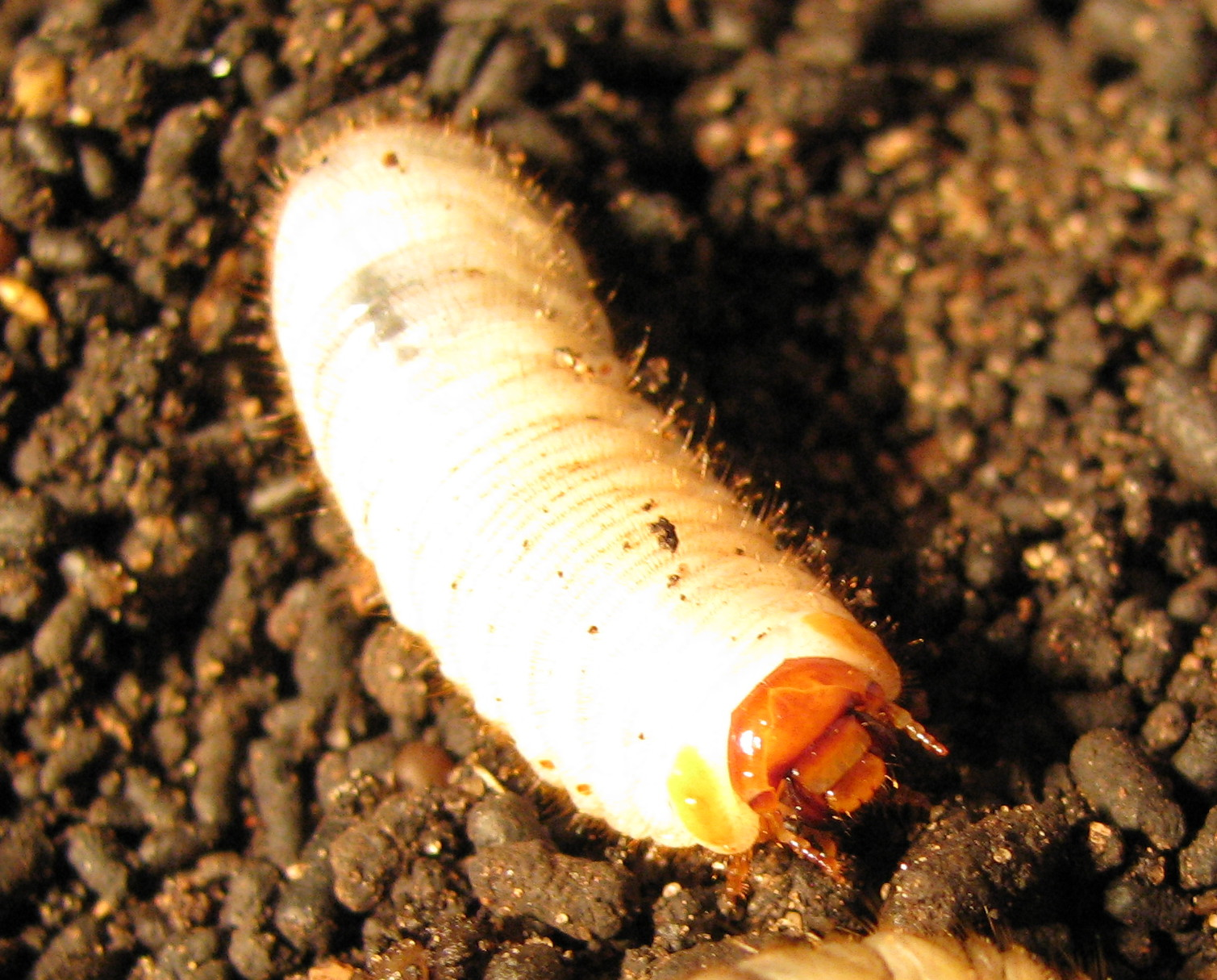
Larva

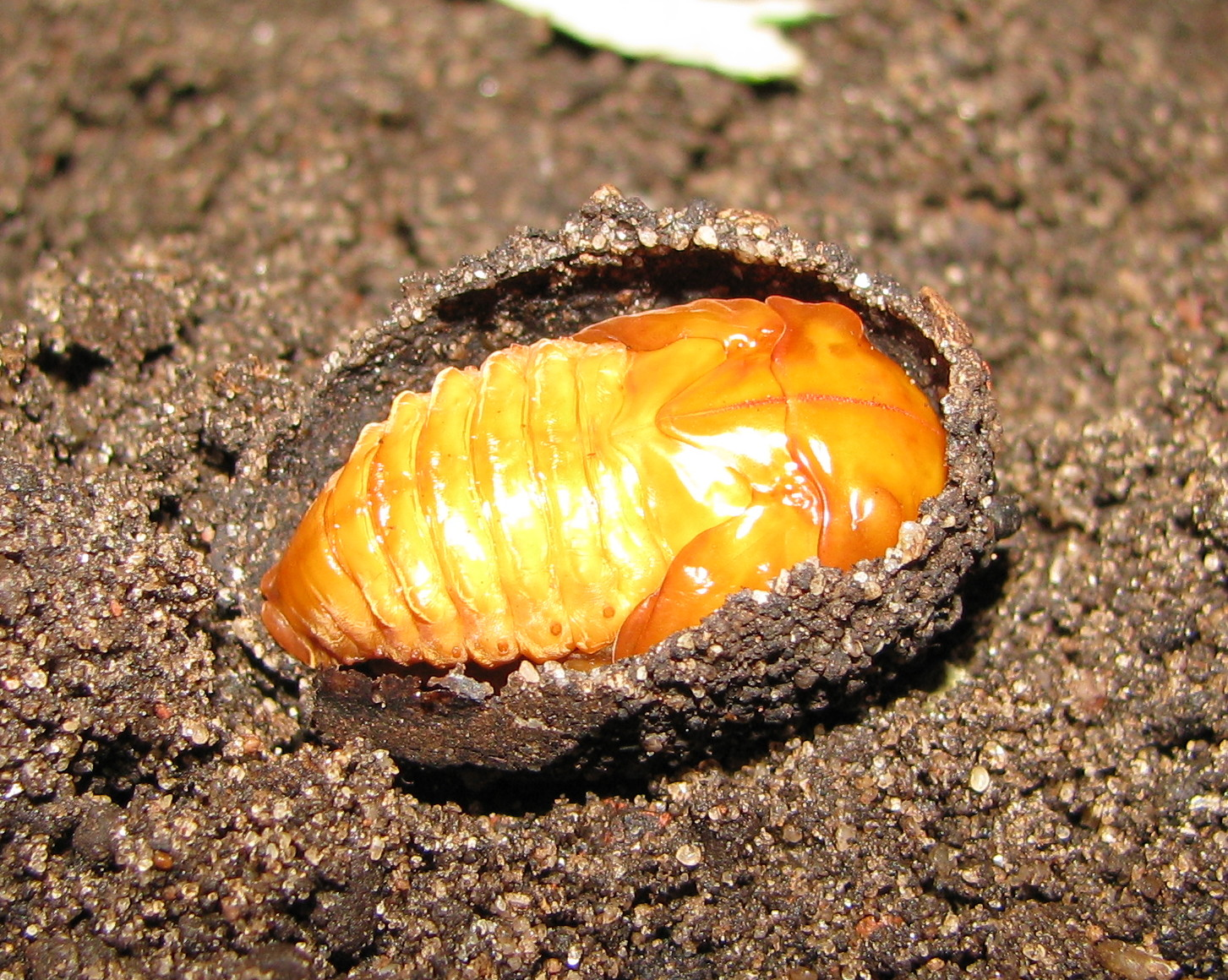
Pupa

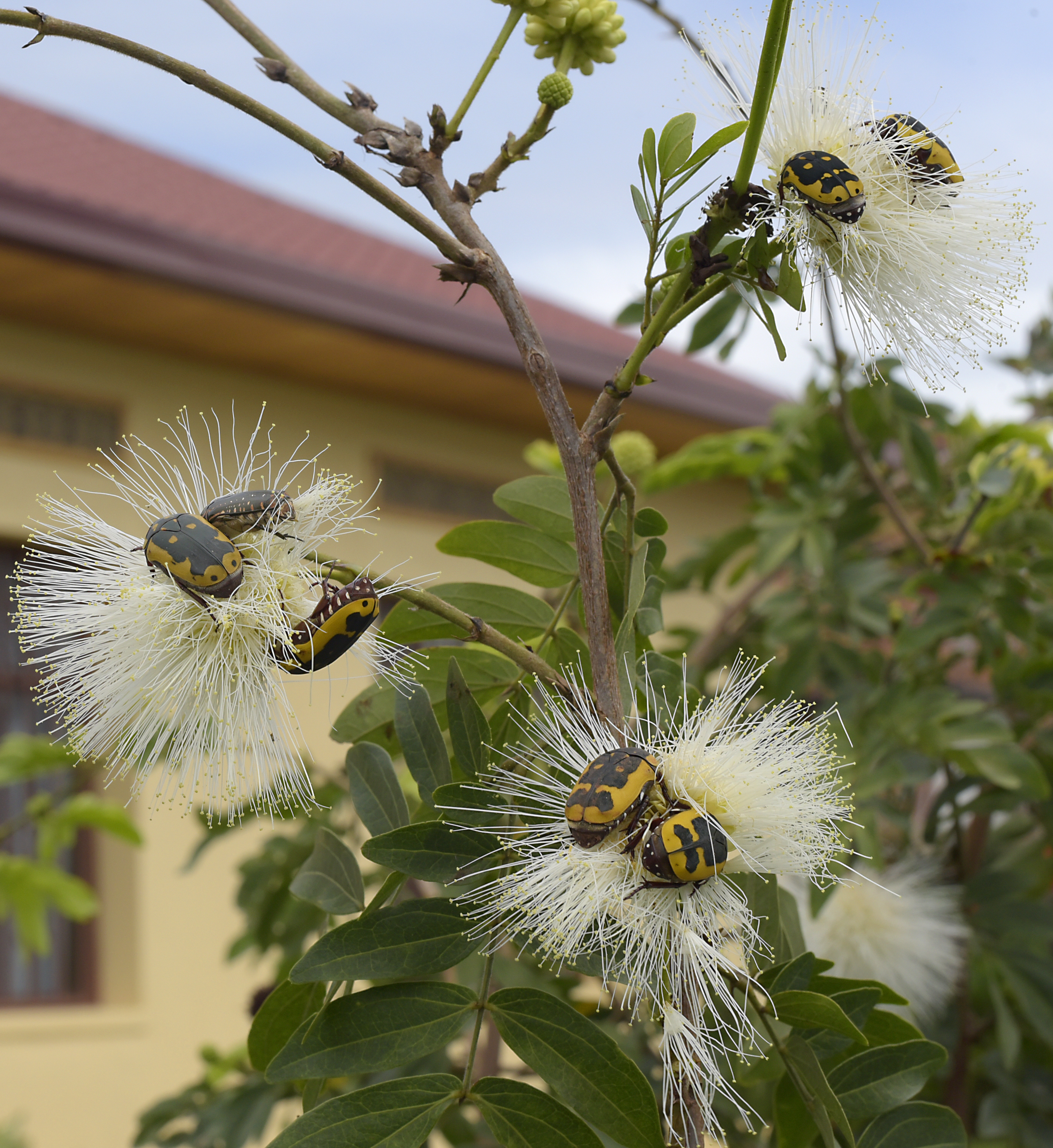
On flowers
