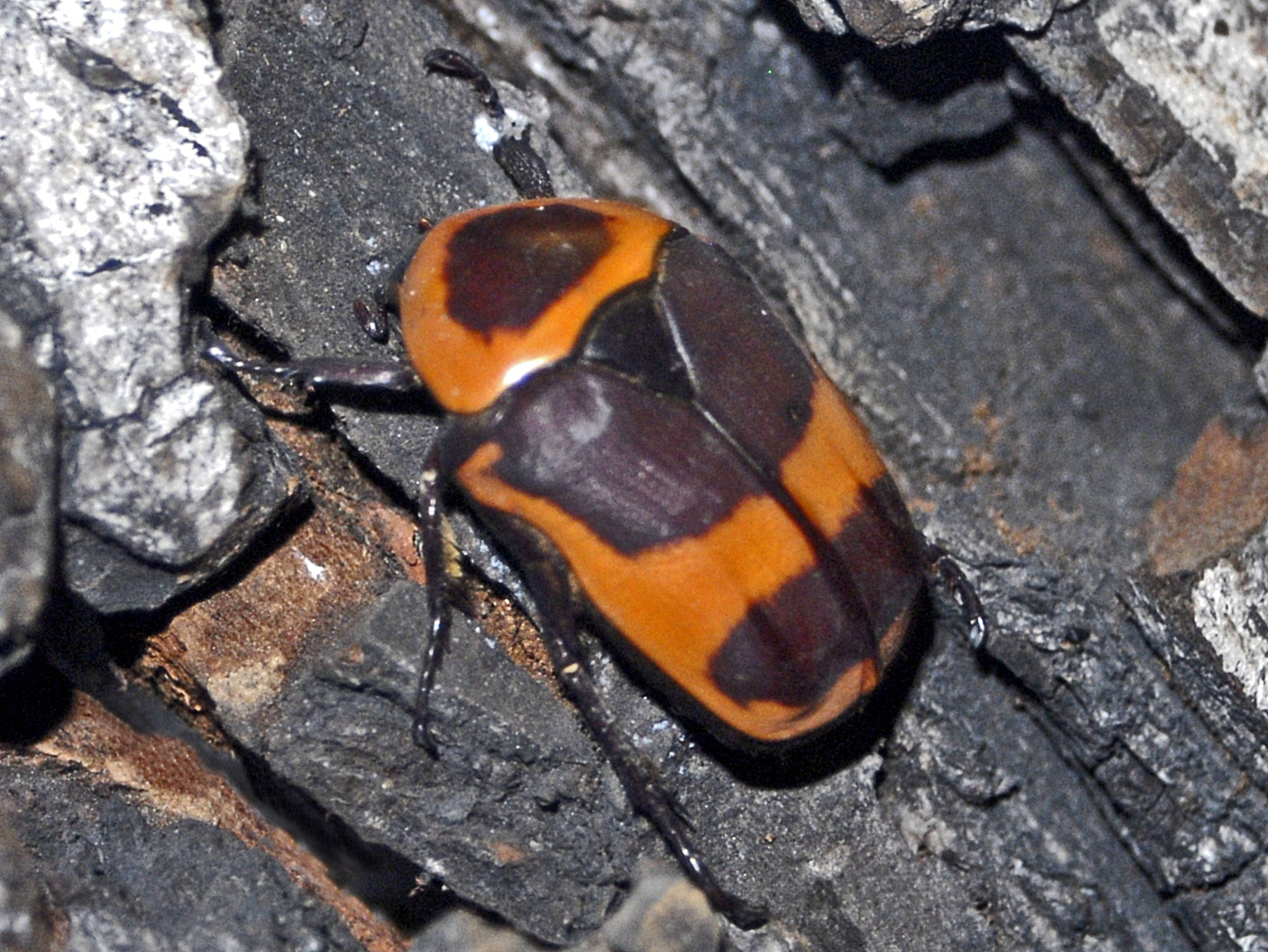

Scientific classification
- Domain: Eukaryota
- Kingdom: Animalia
- Phylum: Arthropoda
- Class: Insecta
- Order: Coleoptera
- Suborder: Polyphaga
- Infraorder: Scarabaeiformia
- Family: Scarabaeidae
- Genus: Pachnoda
- Species: P. savignyi

Binomial name
- Pachnoda savignyi Gory & Percheron, 1833

Synonyms
- Gory & Percheron, 1833: Cetonia aurantia Gory & Percheron, 1833

= Pachnoda savignyi =

Species of beetle

Pachnoda savignyi, the sun beetle, is a beetle belonging to the family Scarabaeidae.

== Subspecies ==
- Pachnoda savignyi consentanea Schaum, 1844
- Pachnoda savignyi savignyi (Gory & Percheron, 1833)

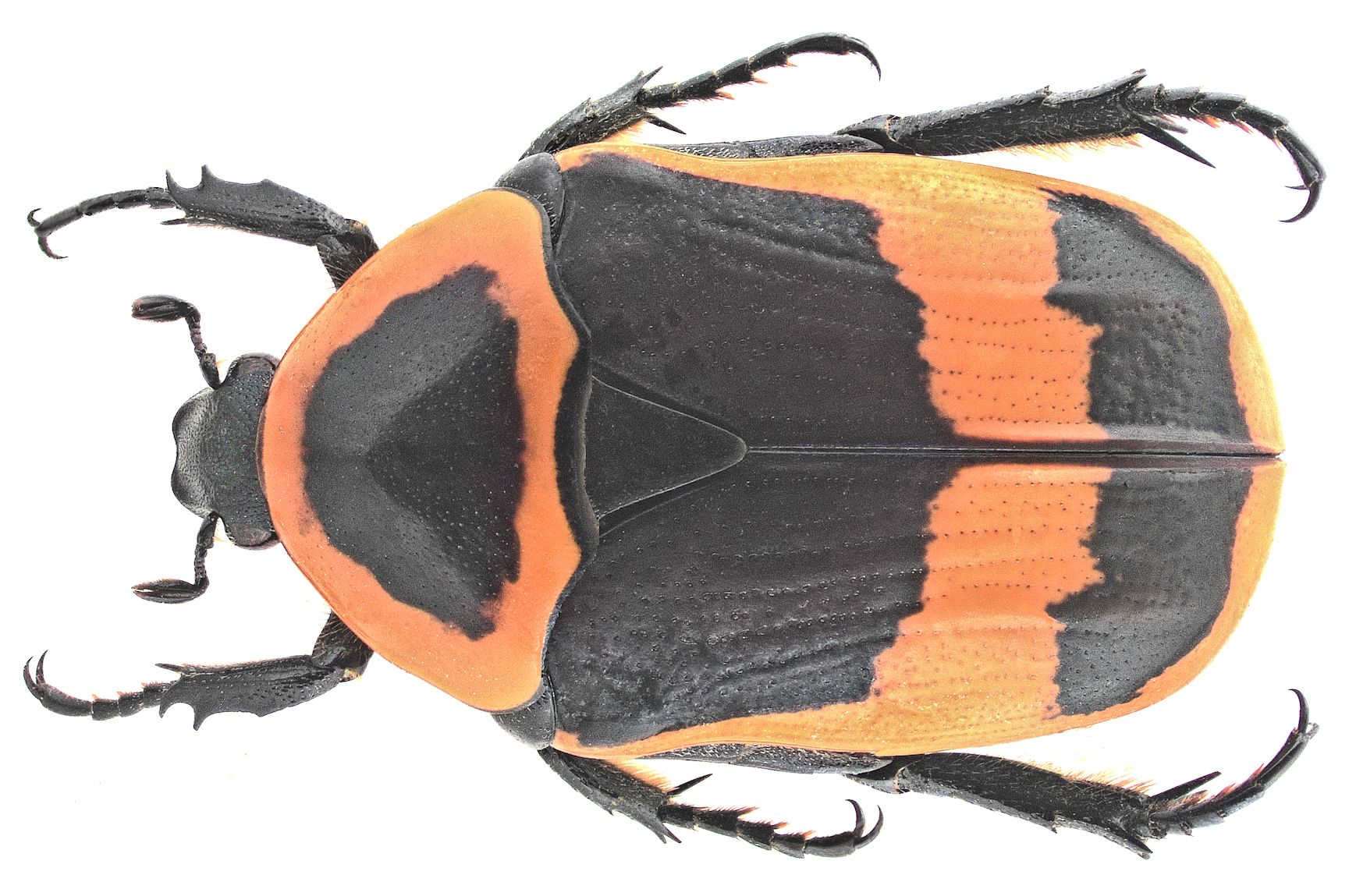
Pachnoda savignyi

== Description ==
Pachnoda savignyi can reach a length of about 23–25 millimetres (0.91–0.98 in). These beetles have slightly flat, square robust bodies with a dark brown-and-yellow or orange colour pattern.

== Distribution ==
This species can be found in North Africa (Morocco, Egypt, Senegal, Chad, and Mali).

== Etymology ==
The species name honours Marie Jules César Savigny.
