= Plectorrhiza erecta =

Upright tangle orchid

Scientific classification
- Kingdom: Plantae
- Clade: Tracheophytes
- Clade: Angiosperms
- Clade: Monocots
- Order: Asparagales
- Family: Orchidaceae
- Subfamily: Epidendroideae
- Genus: Plectorrhiza
- Species: P. erecta

Binomial name
- Plectorrhiza erecta (Fitzg.) Dockrill

Synonyms
- Cleisostoma erectum Fitzg.; Sarcochilus erectus (Fitzg.) F.Muell.; Sarcochilus tridentatus var. erectus (Fitzg.) F.M.Bailey; Sarcanthus erectus (Fitzg.) Rupp

Species of orchid

Plectorrhiza erecta , commonly known as the upright tangle orchid, is an epiphytic or lithophytic orchid that has many coarse, cord-like roots, many bright green leaves and up to five yellowish orange, cup-shaped flowers with purplish blotches. It grows close to the ground on fibrous barked plants and only occurs on Lord Howe Island.

== Description ==
Plectorrhiza erecta is an erect epiphytic or lithophytic herb with many long, tangled, cord-like aerial roots at the base of a stem 100–600 millimetres (3.9–24 in) long. There are many bright green, more or less fleshy, leathery, narrow egg-shaped to oblong leaves 30–45 millimetres (1.2–1.8 in) long and 12–18 millimetres (0.47–0.71 in) wide. Between two and five yellowish orange flowers with purplish brown blotches, 8–10 millimetres (0.31–0.39 in) long and 6–8 millimetres (0.24–0.31 in) wide are borne on a flowering stem 30–40 millimetres (1.2–1.6 in) long. The sepals and petals are fleshy, 3–4 millimetres (0.12–0.16 in) long, about 1 millimetre (0.039 in) wide and curved inwards. The labellum is white to cream-coloured, about 6 millimetres (0.24 in) long, 4 millimetres (0.16 in) wide with hairy side lobes and a blunt middle lobe. The middle lobe has a straight spur about 2 millimetres (0.079 in) long and the column is purple. Flowering occurs from October to December.

== Taxonomy and naming ==
The upright tangle orchid was first described in 1878 by Robert D. FitzGerald who gave it the name Cleisostoma erectum and published the description in his book Australian Orchids. In 1967 Alick Dockrill changed the name to Plectorrhiza erecta. The specific epithet (erecta) is a Latin word meaning "upright".

== Distribution and habitat ==
Plectorrhiza erecta grows near the ground on the fibrous bark of trees and shrubs with its roots spreading over the bark, leaf litter and nearby rocks. It is found near the coast and at altitudes of up to 530 metres (1,700 ft) on Lord Howe Island.
