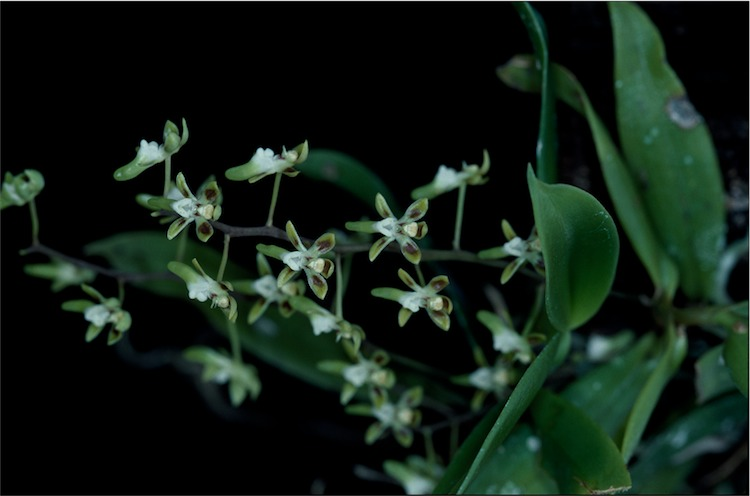
- On Cape York Peninsula

Scientific classification
- Kingdom: Plantae
- Clade: Tracheophytes
- Clade: Angiosperms
- Clade: Monocots
- Order: Asparagales
- Family: Orchidaceae
- Subfamily: Epidendroideae
- Tribe: Vandeae
- Subtribe: Aeridinae
- Genus: Plectorrhiza; Dockrill

Synonyms
- Papillilabium Dockrill; Schistotylus Dockrill

= Plectorrhiza =

Tangle orchids

Genus of orchids

Plectorrhiza, commonly known as tangle orchids, is a genus of three species of flowering plants from the orchid family, Orchidaceae and is endemic to Australia. Orchids in the genus Plectorrhiza are epiphytic or lithophytic herbs with short stems, long, tangled roots, short leathery leaves and small flowers on a short, thin flowering stem. Two species occur in eastern Australia and one is endemic to Lord Howe Island.

== Description ==
Orchids in the genus Plectorrhiza are epiphytic or lithophytic, monopodial herbs with long, thick, tangled roots mostly growing in the air. They have two or more short, leathery leaves on each shoot. There are several small, resupinate flowers on a short, thin flowering stem. The sepals and petals are similar to and free from each other, the petals slightly shorter than the sepals. The labellum has three lobes and a backward-pointing spur with a hairy, finger-like callus.

== Taxonomy and naming ==
The genus Plectorrhiza was first formally described in 1967 by Alick Dockrill and the description was published in Australasian Sarcanthinae. The three species of Plectorrhiza had previously been included in the genus Cleisostoma.

=== Species list ===
- Plectorrhiza brevilabris (F.Muell.) Dockrill
- Plectorrhiza erecta (Fitzg.) Dockrill
- Plectorrhiza tridentata (Lindl.) Dockrill

== Distribution and habitat ==
All three species of Plectorrhiza grow in shady, humid forests. Plectorrhiza tridentata is the most widespread of the three, growing in eastern Queensland, New South Wales and the far north-eastern corner of Victoria. Plectorrhiza brevilabris is only found in Queensland and P. erecta only in coastal parts of Lord Howe Island.

== See also ==
- List of Orchidaceae genera
