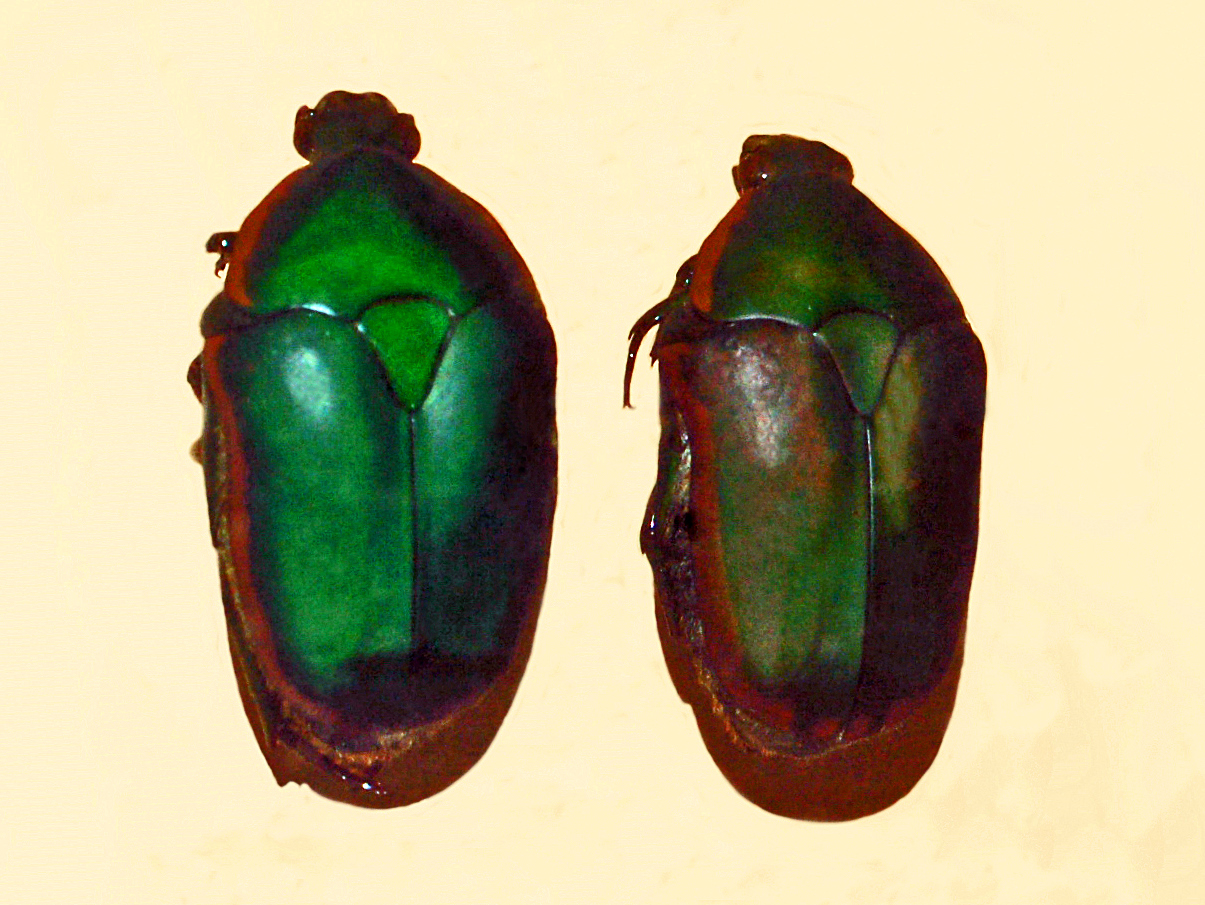
- Pachnoda prasina from São Tomé and Príncipe

Scientific classification
- Kingdom: Animalia
- Phylum: Arthropoda
- Clade: Pancrustacea
- Class: Insecta
- Order: Coleoptera
- Suborder: Polyphaga
- Infraorder: Scarabaeiformia
- Family: Scarabaeidae
- Genus: Pachnoda
- Species: P. prasina

Binomial name
- Pachnoda prasina Karsch, 1881

= Pachnoda prasina =

Species of beetle

Pachnoda prasina is a beetle belonging to the family Scarabaeidae. This species can be found in São Tomé and Príncipe and in Guinea. It is commonly identified by its metallic green color.
