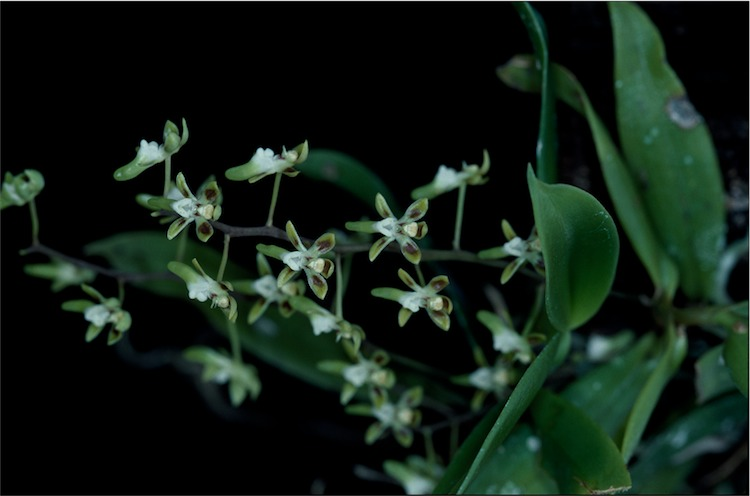
- Plectorrhiza brevilabris on Cape York Peninsula

Scientific classification
- Kingdom: Plantae
- Clade: Tracheophytes
- Clade: Angiosperms
- Clade: Monocots
- Order: Asparagales
- Family: Orchidaceae
- Subfamily: Epidendroideae
- Genus: Plectorrhiza
- Species: P. brevilabris

Binomial name
- Plectorrhiza brevilabris (F.Muell.) Dockrill

Synonyms
- Cleisostoma brevilabre F.Muell.; Saccolabium brevilabre (F.Muell.) Rupp; Sarcochilus brevilabris (F.Muell.) F.Muell.; Saccolabium loaderianum Rupp

= Plectorrhiza brevilabris =

Small tangle orchid

Species of orchid

Plectorrhiza brevilabris, commonly known as the small tangle orchid, is an epiphytic or lithophytic orchid endemic to Australia. It has many coarse, wiry roots, between three and nine bright green leaves and up to twenty green, star-shaped flowers with reddish brown markings and a white patch on the labellum. It grows in rainforest on trees, shrubs and occasionally on rocks and occurs on the near coastal ranges of eastern Queensland.

== Description ==
Plectorrhiza brevilabris is an epiphytic or lithophytic herb with a single main flattened stem, 100–500 mm (3.9–20 in) long with many coarse, wiry roots near its base. There are between three and nine dark green, leathery, narrow egg-shaped to elliptic leaves 50–80 mm (2.0–3.1 in) long and 10–15 mm (0.39–0.59 in) wide. Between three and twenty green flowers with reddish brown markings, 12–15 mm (0.47–0.59 in) long and 8–10 mm (0.31–0.39 in) wide are borne on an arching flowering stem 60–180 mm (2.4–7.1 in) long. The sepals and petals are free from each other and spread widely apart. The dorsal sepal is 3–4 mm (0.12–0.16 in) long, about 2 mm (0.079 in) wide and the lateral sepals are 5–7 mm (0.20–0.28 in) long and about 1 mm (0.039 in) wide. The petals are 4–5 mm (0.16–0.20 in) long, about 2 mm (0.079 in) wide. The labellum is green with a white patch, 6–7 mm (0.24–0.28 in) long, about 3 mm (0.12 in) wide with three lobes. The side lobes curve outwards and the middle lobe has a white, fleshy spur about 7 mm (0.28 in) long that curves downwards. Flowering occurs from November to February.

== Taxonomy and naming ==
The small tangle orchid was first formally described in 1880 by Ferdinand von Mueller who gave it the name Cleisostoma brevilabre and published the description in Fragmenta phytographiae Australiae. In 1967 Alick Dockrill changed the name to Plectorrhiza brevilabris. The specific epithet (brevilabris) is derived from the Latin words brevis meaning "short" and labrum meaning "lip".

== Distribution and habitat ==
Plectorrhiza brevilabris grows in rainforest on small trees, shrubs and the thinner branches of larger trees. It is found in the McIlwraith Range and in near coastal ranges and tableland south to the Noosa River.
