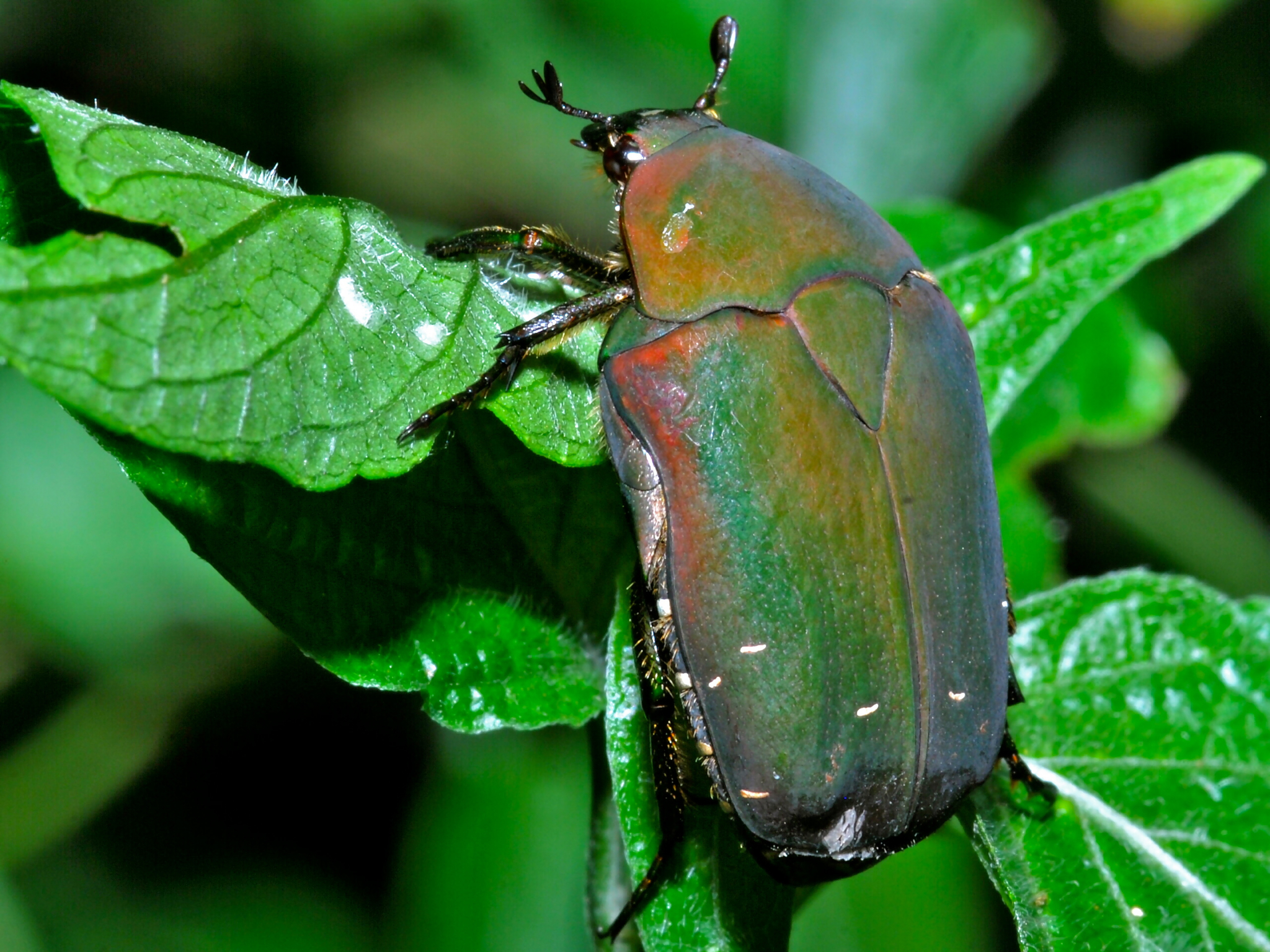

Scientific classification
- Kingdom: Animalia
- Phylum: Arthropoda
- Clade: Pancrustacea
- Class: Insecta
- Order: Coleoptera
- Suborder: Polyphaga
- Infraorder: Scarabaeiformia
- Family: Scarabaeidae
- Genus: Pachnoda
- Species: P. bukobensis

Binomial name
- Pachnoda bukobensis Moser, 1914

= Pachnoda bukobensis =

Species of insect

Pachnoda bukobensis is a beetle from the genus Pachnoda. The species was originally described by Johannes Moser in 1914.

== Description ==
Pachnoda bukobensis has a dark green opaque colour when looked at from above. Its sides can be red, while its underside is glossy and white-stained. Its head, forehead and shield can be densely speckled with a curved front edge of the shield. There are four white single spots at the posterior side of the shield. Underneath the middle left abdominal segments of the last chin of female samples are densely aciculate-dotted and blond-hairy. The chest and abdominal sides sparingly punctured, with pinkish dots.

The beetle is described as being 22 mm long.

=== Similar species ===
Pachnoda bukobensis is similar and closely related to the Pachnoda rubrocintae.

== Range ==
When first described in 1914 the species was observed in German East Africa. Which in that era included parts of Tanzania, Burundi and Rwanda. More recently the beetle has been observed in Uganda and Angola.
