= Pachnoda bourgeoni =

Scientific classification
- Kingdom: Animalia
- Phylum: Arthropoda
- Clade: Pancrustacea
- Class: Insecta
- Order: Coleoptera
- Suborder: Polyphaga
- Infraorder: Scarabaeiformia
- Family: Scarabaeidae
- Genus: Pachnoda
- Species: P. bourgeoni

Binomial name
- Pachnoda bourgeoni Moser, 1924

Species of beetle

Pachnoda bourgeoni is a species of beetle of the family Scarabaeidae. It is found in the Democratic Republic of the Congo.

== Description ==
Adults reach a length of about 21 mm (0.83 in). They are dull, yellow and black-spotted above and reddish and glossy below. The head is blackish-green. The pronotum is black in the middle, and marked with six yellow spots and a yellow lateral stripe containing a small black spot before the middle. The scutellum is yellow with a black longitudinal median stripe and the elytra are marked with two transverse black bands and a black pre-apical spot. The pygidium is reddish, with two white spots behind the anterior margin.
