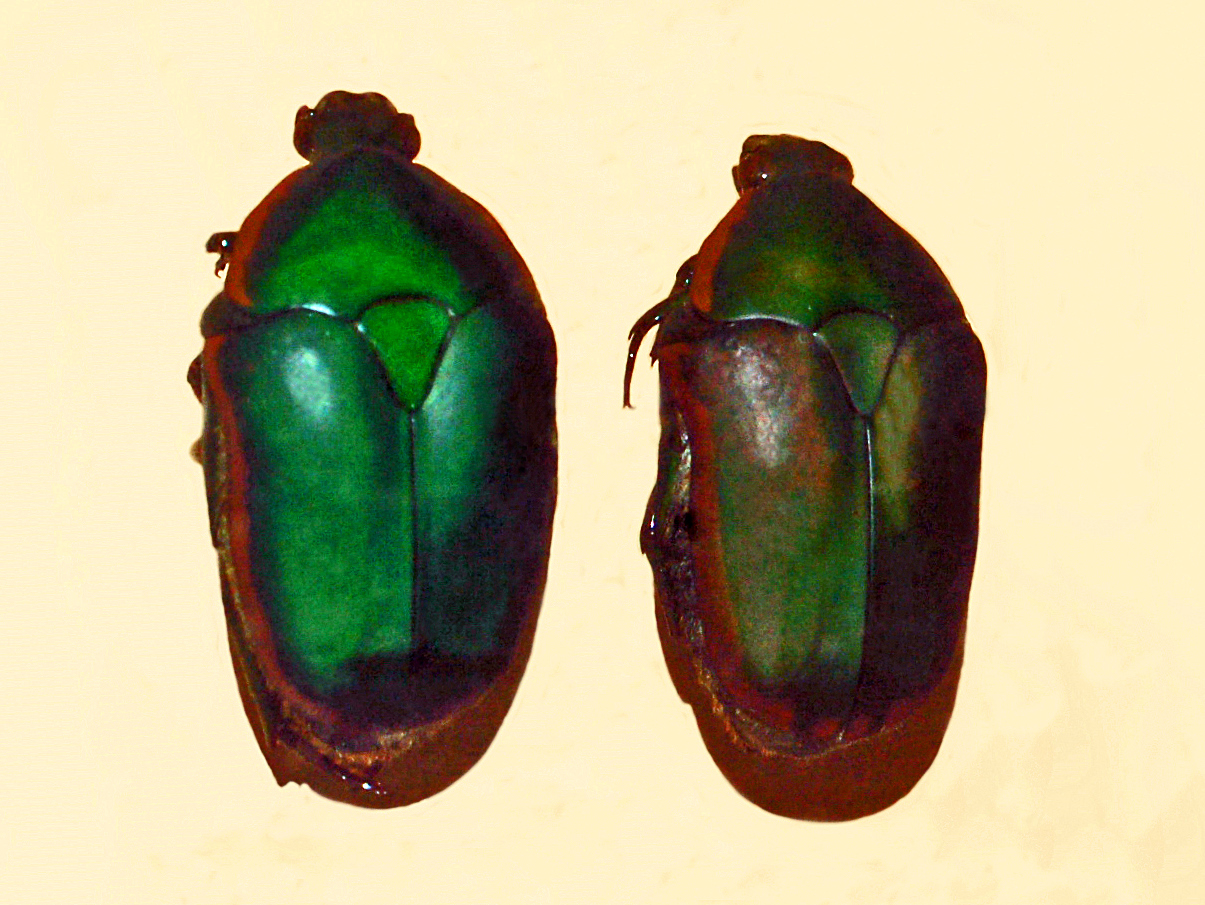
- Pachnoda prasina from São Tomé and Príncipe

Scientific classification
- Kingdom: Animalia
- Phylum: Arthropoda
- Class: Insecta
- Order: Coleoptera
- Suborder: Polyphaga
- Infraorder: Scarabaeiformia
- Family: Scarabaeidae
- Subfamily: Cetoniinae
- Genus: Pachnoda; Burmeister, 1842

Type species
- Pachnoda marginata (Drury, 1773)

= Pachnoda =

Genus of beetles

Pachnoda is a genus of beetles from the subfamily Cetoniinae with nearly all of the species living in Africa. The limit of the genus is given by the presence of internal lobes in their aedeagi.

== Species ==
List of species:

- Pachnoda abyssinica (Blanchard, 1842)
- Pachnoda acutipennis (Kolbe, 1914)
- Pachnoda adelpha Kolbe, 1914
- Pachnoda albini Bourgoin, 1921
- Pachnoda allardi Ruter, 1969
- Pachnoda alluaudi Bourgoin, 1913
- Pachnoda antoinei Beinhundner, 2006
- Pachnoda ardoini Ruter, 1978
- Pachnoda arrowi Bourgoin, 1913
- Pachnoda babaulti Bourgoin, 1921
- Pachnoda basilewskyi Ruter, 1953
- Pachnoda bax (Gory & Percheron, 1833)
- Pachnoda berliozi Rigout, 1980
- Pachnoda bourgeoni Moser, 1924
- Pachnoda bourgoini Burgeon, 1931
- Pachnoda bousqueti Rigout, 1989
- Pachnoda bukobensis Moser, 1914
- Pachnoda cervenkai Krajcik, 2002
- Pachnoda chionopleura Fairmaire, 1884
- Pachnoda chireyi Legrand, 1993
- Pachnoda cincticollis Moser, 1914
- Pachnoda collinsi Rigout, 1985
- Pachnoda concolor Schürhoff, 1938
- Pachnoda congoensis Moser, 1914
- Pachnoda coolsi Rigout, 1984
- Pachnoda cordata (Drury, 1773)
- Pachnoda crassa Schaum, 1848
- Pachnoda crinita Schürhoff, 1938
- Pachnoda dargei Rigout, 1987
- Pachnoda dechambrei Rigout, 1986
- Pachnoda demoulini Rigout, 1978
- Pachnoda denuttae Ruter, 1972
- Pachnoda dimidiaticollis Moser, 1915
- Pachnoda discolor Kolbe, 1895
- Pachnoda divisa Gerstaecker, 1884
- Pachnoda durandi Ruter, 1958
- Pachnoda elegantissima Csiki, 1909
- Pachnoda ephippiata Gerstaecker, 1867
- Pachnoda fairmairei (Raffray, 1877)
- Pachnoda fasciata (Fabricius, 1775)
- Pachnoda fedierei Rigout, 1989
- Pachnoda fissipunctum Kraatz, 1885
- Pachnoda fromenti Rigout, 1981
- Pachnoda frontalis (Harold, 1878)
- Pachnoda helleri Moser, 1910
- Pachnoda histrio (Fabricius, 1775)
- Pachnoda histrioides (Pouillaude, 1914)
- Pachnoda impressa (Goldfuss, 1805)
- Pachnoda inscripta (Gory & Percheron, 1833)
- Pachnoda interrupta (Olivier, 1789)
- Pachnoda jokoensis Moser, 1915
- Pachnoda katangensis Burgeon, 1931
- Pachnoda kiellandi Rigout, 1989
- Pachnoda knirschi Rigout, 1984
- Pachnoda kordofana Moser, 1914
- Pachnoda kühbandneri Beinhundner, 1997
- Pachnoda kustai (Nonfried, 1892)
- Pachnoda lamottei Ruter, 1954
- Pachnoda lateristicta Kolbe, 1910
- Pachnoda leclercqi Rigout, 1985
- Pachnoda leonina Schoch, 1896
- Pachnoda leopoldiana Burgeon, 1931
- Pachnoda lequeuxi Rigout, 1979
- Pachnoda lerui Rigout, 1989
- Pachnoda limbata (Fabricius, 1775)
- Pachnoda maculipennis Moser, 1918
- Pachnoda madaraszi Csiki, 1909
- Pachnoda madgei Rigout, 1995
- Pachnoda marginata (Drury, 1773)
- Pachnoda massajae Gestro, 1881
- Pachnoda mastrucata Gerstaecker, 1884
- Pachnoda meloui Bourgoin, 1915
- Pachnoda nigritarsis Harold, 1880
- Pachnoda nigroplagiata Kraatz, 1900
- Pachnoda nutricia Rigout, 1980
- Pachnoda onorei Rigout, 1980
- Pachnoda orphanula (Herbst, 1790)
- Pachnoda pendemi Schürhoff, 1938
- Pachnoda picturata Boheman, 1860
- Pachnoda poggei (Harold, 1878)
- Pachnoda polita Blanchard, 1842
- Pachnoda postica (Gory & Percheron, 1833)
- Pachnoda postmedia Moser, 1915
- Pachnoda praecellens Moser, 1908
- Pachnoda prasina Karsch, 1881
- Pachnoda rectangularis Vuillet, 1911
- Pachnoda rougemonti Rigout, 1984
- Pachnoda rubriventris Moser, 1910
- Pachnoda rubrocincta Hope, 1847
- Pachnoda rufa (De Geer, 1778)
- Pachnoda rufomarginata Burmeister, 1842
- Pachnoda rwandana Rigout, 1984
- Pachnoda savignyi (Gory & Percheron, 1833)
- Pachnoda sciencesnati Rigout, 1989
- Pachnoda semiflava Kraatz, 1900
- Pachnoda sinuata (Fabricius, 1775)
- Pachnoda sjoestedti Moser, 1921
- Pachnoda spinipennis Moser, 1914
- Pachnoda steheleni Schaum, 1841
- Pachnoda stehelini (Schaum, 1841)
- Pachnoda tessmanni Schürhoff, 1938
- Pachnoda thoracica (Fabricius, 1775)
- Pachnoda tridentata (Olivier, 1789)
- Pachnoda trimaculata Kraatz, 1885
- Pachnoda tshikambai Rigout, 1984
- Pachnoda uelensis Burgeon, 1931
- Pachnoda upangwana Moser, 1918
- Pachnoda vethi Lansberge, 1886
- Pachnoda viridana Blanchard, 1850
- Pachnoda viridiflua Kraatz, 1900
- Pachnoda vitticollis Moser, 1914
- Pachnoda vossi Kolbe, 1892
- Pachnoda vuilleti Bourgoin, 1914
- Pachnoda watulegei Rigout, 1981
- Pachnoda werneri Beinhunder, 1993

== Gallery ==
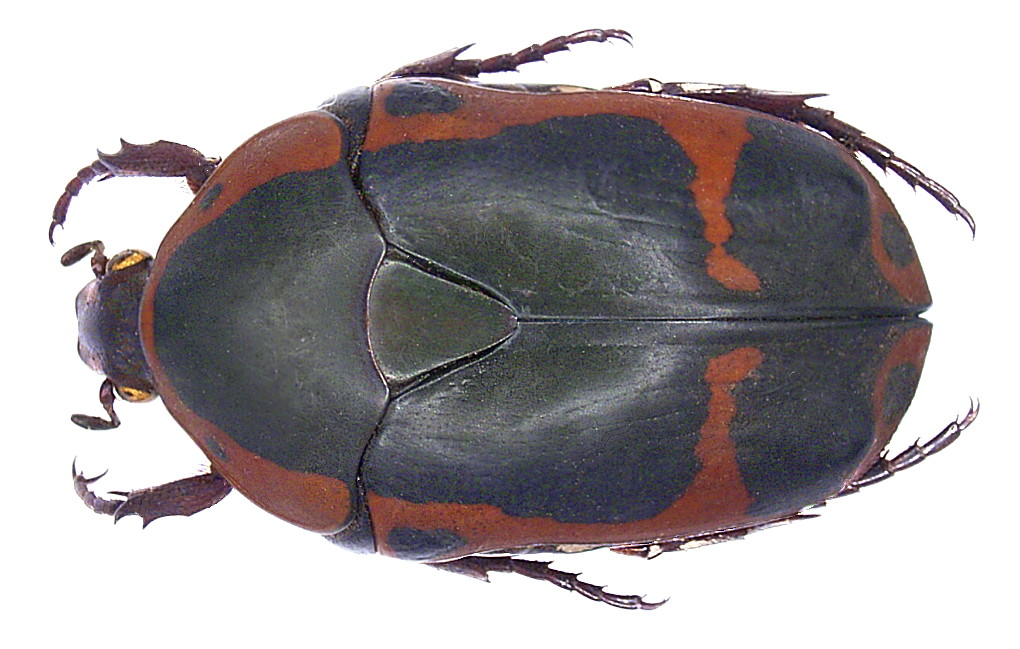
Pachnoda flaviventris

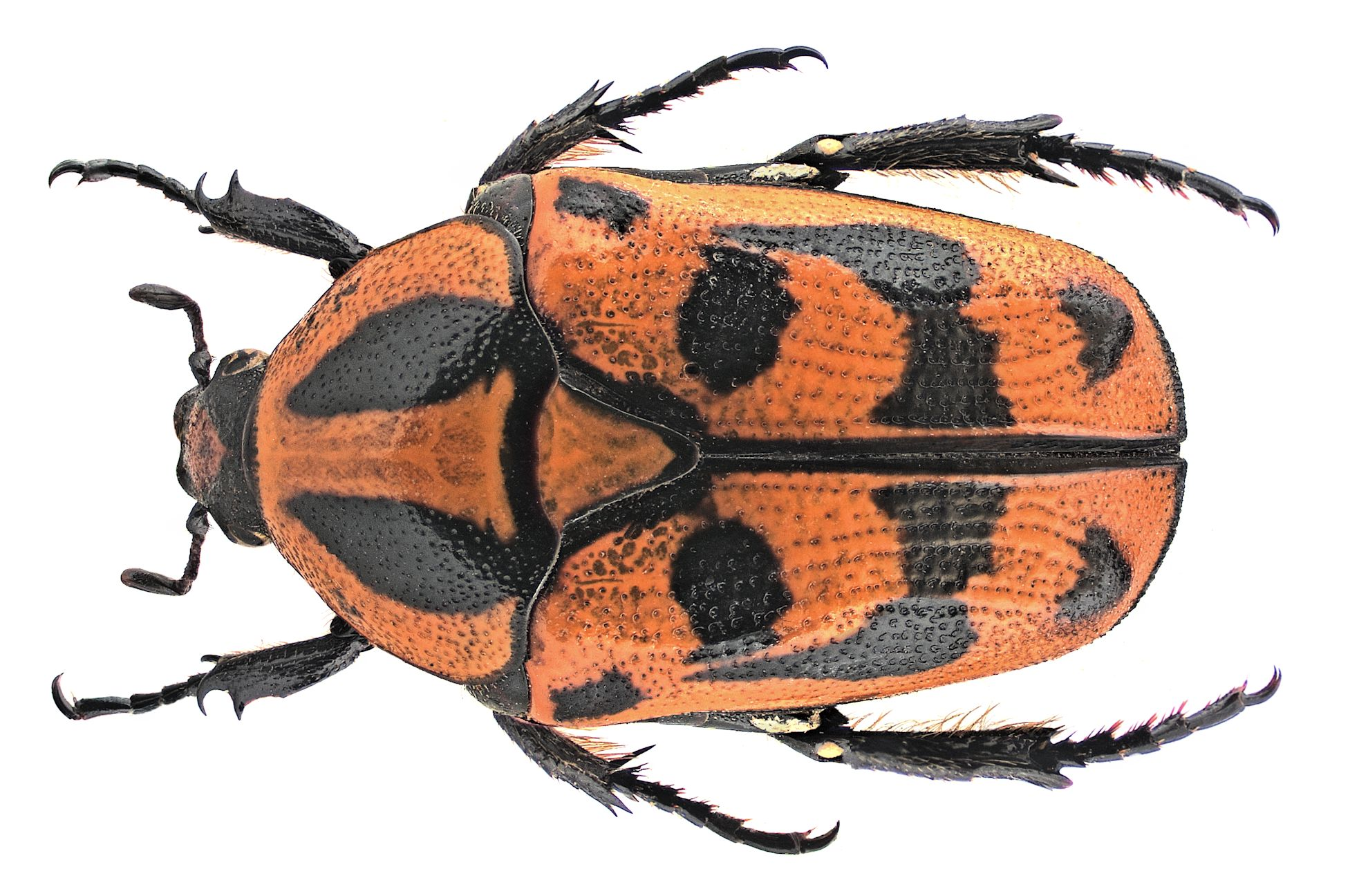
Pachnoda interrupta

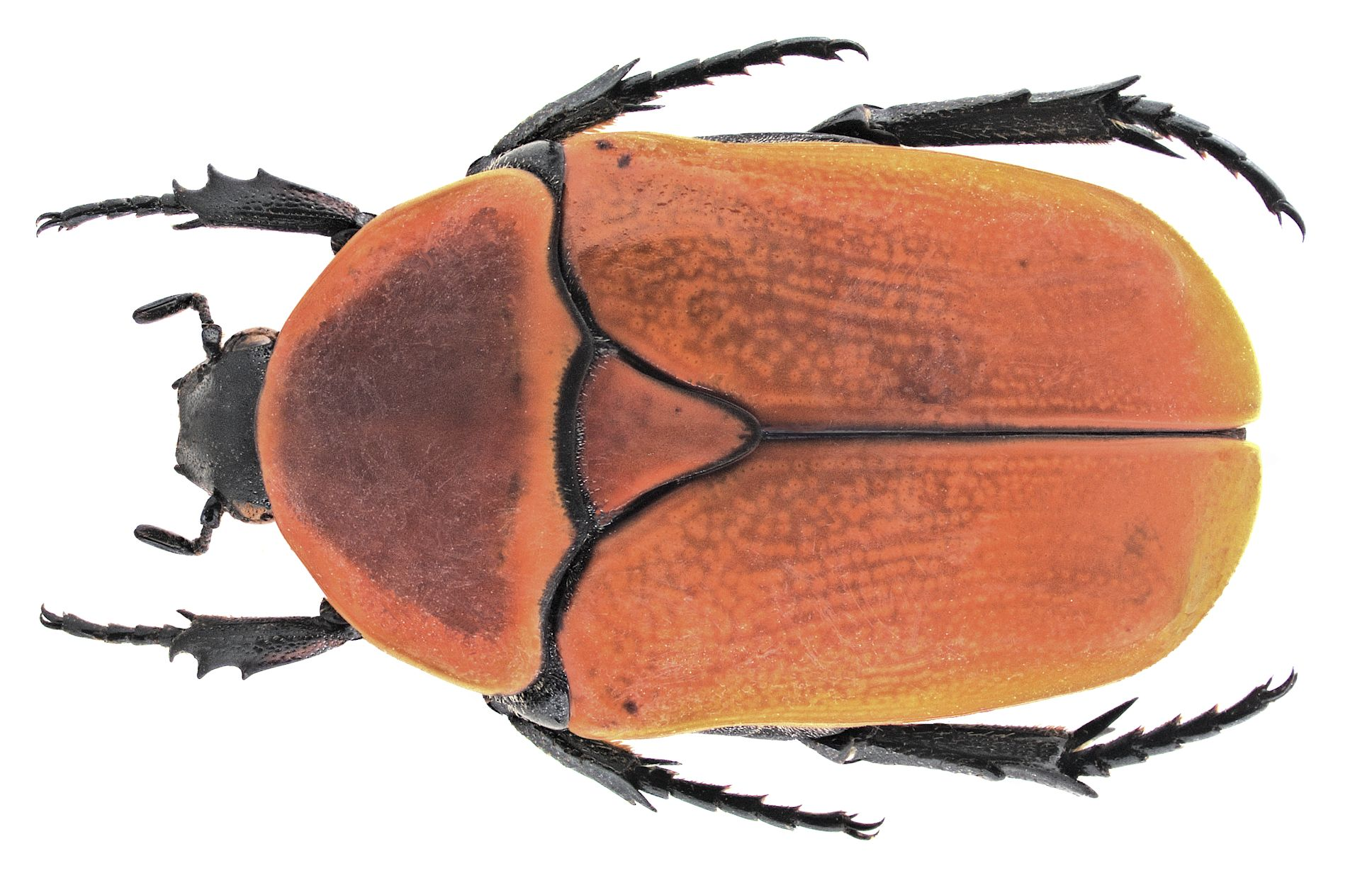
Pachnoda marginata aurantia

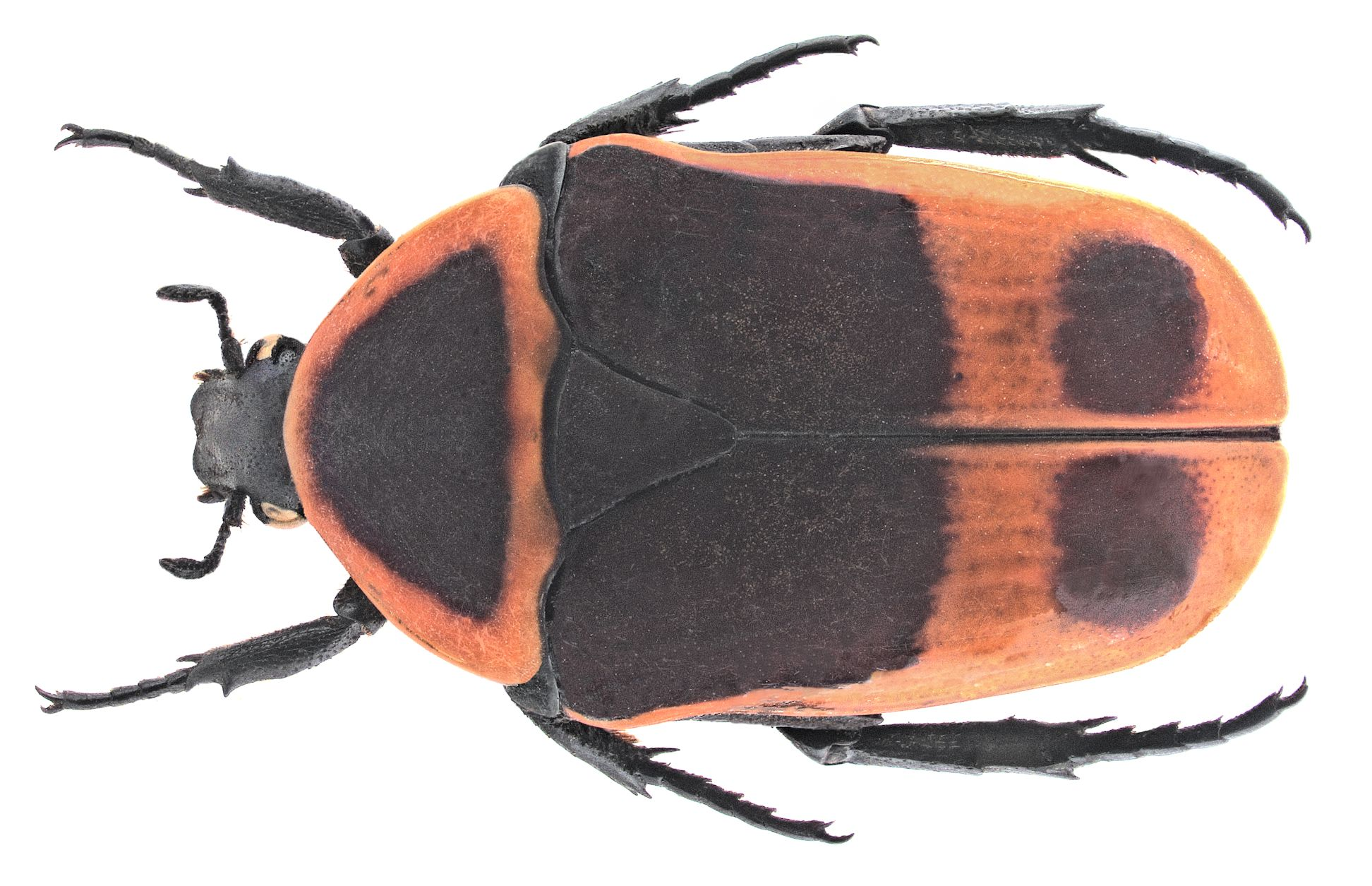
Pachnoda marginata murielae

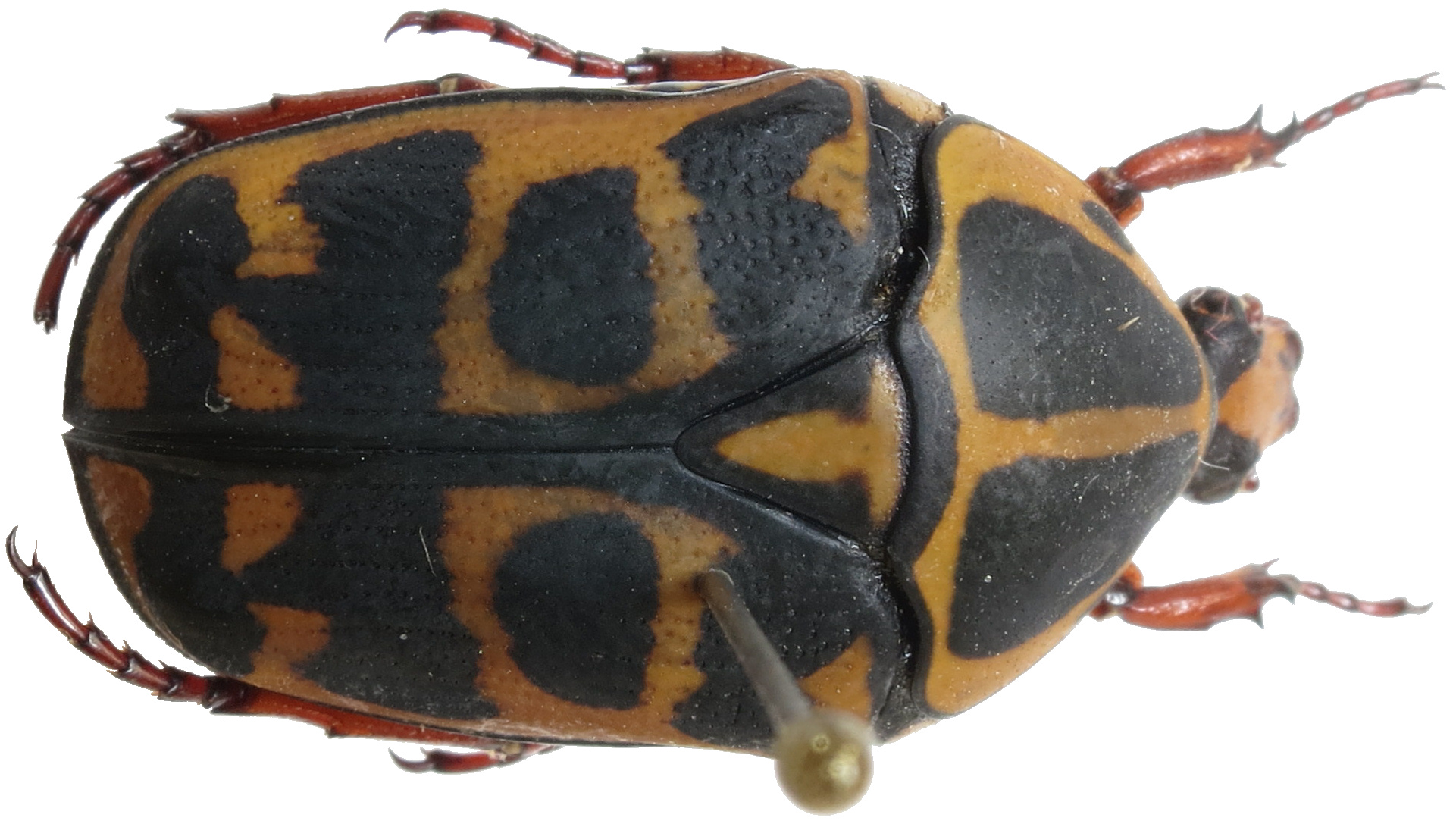
Pachnoda cordata from Togo

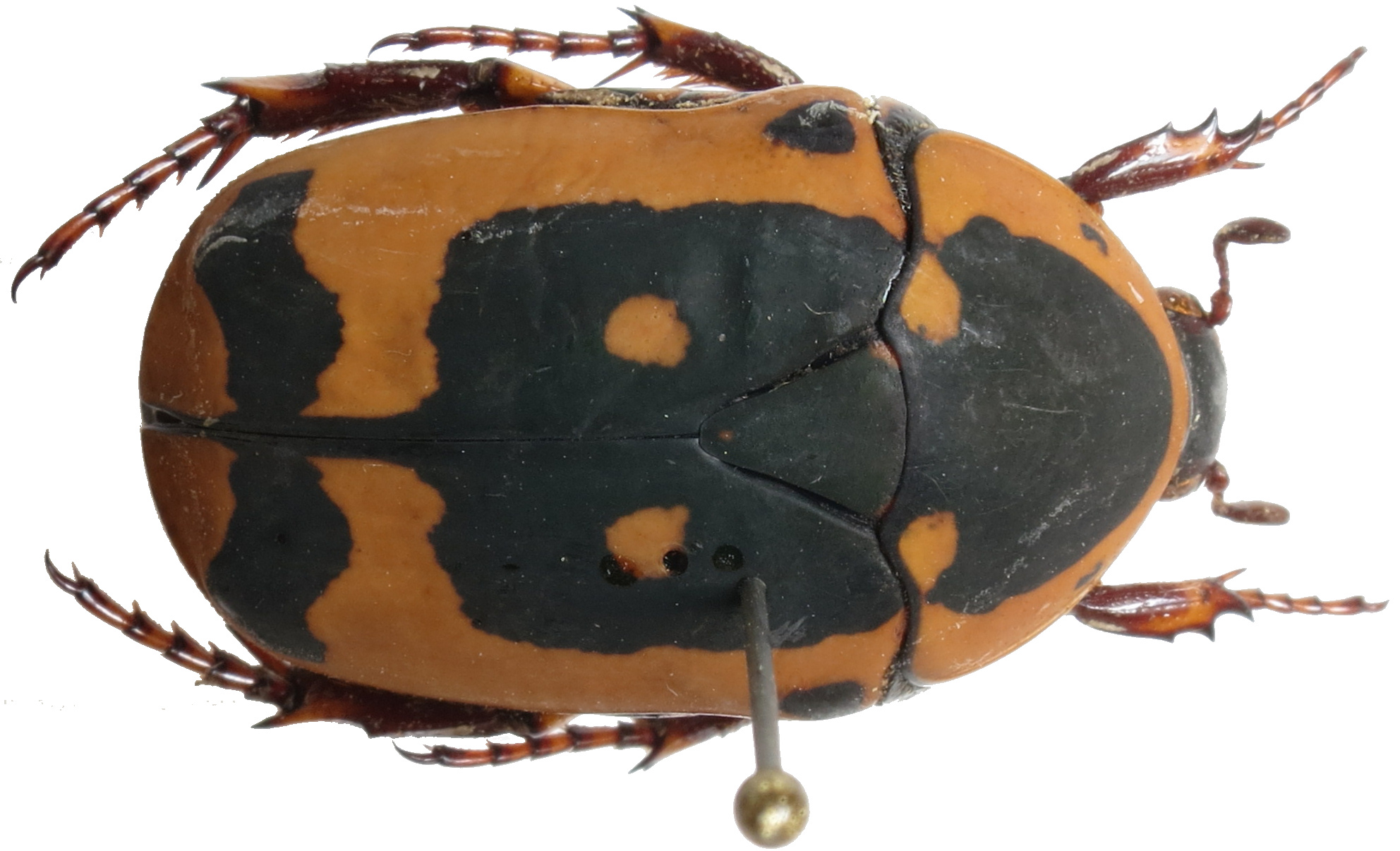
Pachnoda fissipunctum aemula from Tanzania

== Bibliography ==
- Legrand (J.-Ph.) - 1993, Deux nouvelles cétoines de l'Est africain, Bulletin de la Société Sciences Nat, 77, p. 3-4.
- Le Thaut (P.) - 2004, Contribution à la distribution de Pachnoda fasciata (Fabricius 1775) en Arabie Saoudite, Cetoniimania 1(1), pp. 28–32
- Rigout (J.) - 1977, La détermination des Pachnoda, Bulletin de la Société Sciences Nat, 16, pp. 16–14, 1 col. plate.
- Rigout (J.) - 1978, Description d'une nouvelle espèce de Pachnoda et note synonymique sur une sous-espèce, Bulletin de la Société Sciences Nat, 17, pp. 2–4.
- Rigout (J.) - 1979, Note sur quelques Pachnoda du Sud-Est Rwanda, Bulletin de la Société Sciences Nat, 21, pp. 10–12, 1 col. plate.
- Rigout (J.) - 1980, Description d'une nouvelle espèce de Pachnoda de la Côte d'Ivoire, Bulletin de la Société Sciences Nat, 24, pp. 2–3.
- Rigout (J.) - 1980, Révision des Pachnoda des groupes postmedia Moser et postica Gory & Percheron, Bulletin de la Société Sciences Nat, 26, pp. 14–21, 1 col. plate.
- Rigout (J.) - 1981, Les Pachnoda du groupe ephippiata Gerstraecker, Bulletin de la Société Sciences Nat, 29 & 30, pp. 51–54, 1 col. plate.
- Rigout (J.) - 1983, Les petites Pachnoda vert et jaune, Bulletin de la Société Sciences Nat, 35, pp. 1–6, 1 col. plate.
- Rigout (J.) - 1984, Le genre Pachnoda : note synonymique et description d'insectes nouveaux, Bulletin de la Société Sciences Nat, 43, pp. 1–3.
- Rigout (J.) - 1984, Note pour servir à l'élaboration d'un catalogue du genre Pachnoda, Bulletin de la Société Sciences Nat, 44, pp. 11–15.
- Rigout (J.) - 1985, Note sur les Pachnoda, Bulletin de la Société Sciences Nat, 46, pp. 3–6.
- Rigout (J.) - 1985, Note sur quelques espèces du genre Pachnoda, Bulletin de la Société Sciences Nat, 47, pp. 25–26.
- Rigout (J.) - 1987, Description d'une nouvelle espèce et de trois nouvelles sous-espèces de Pachnoda et note sur P. aemula Bourgoin et P. arborescens Vigors, Bulletin de la Société Sciences Nat, 53, pp. 27–53.
- Rigout (J.) - 1989, Un Pachnoda nouveau de l'Uganda, Bulletin de la Société Sciences Nat, 64, p. 18.
- Rigout (J.) - 1995, Un nouveau Pachnoda du Mali, Bulletin de la Société Sciences Nat, 83, p. 8.
