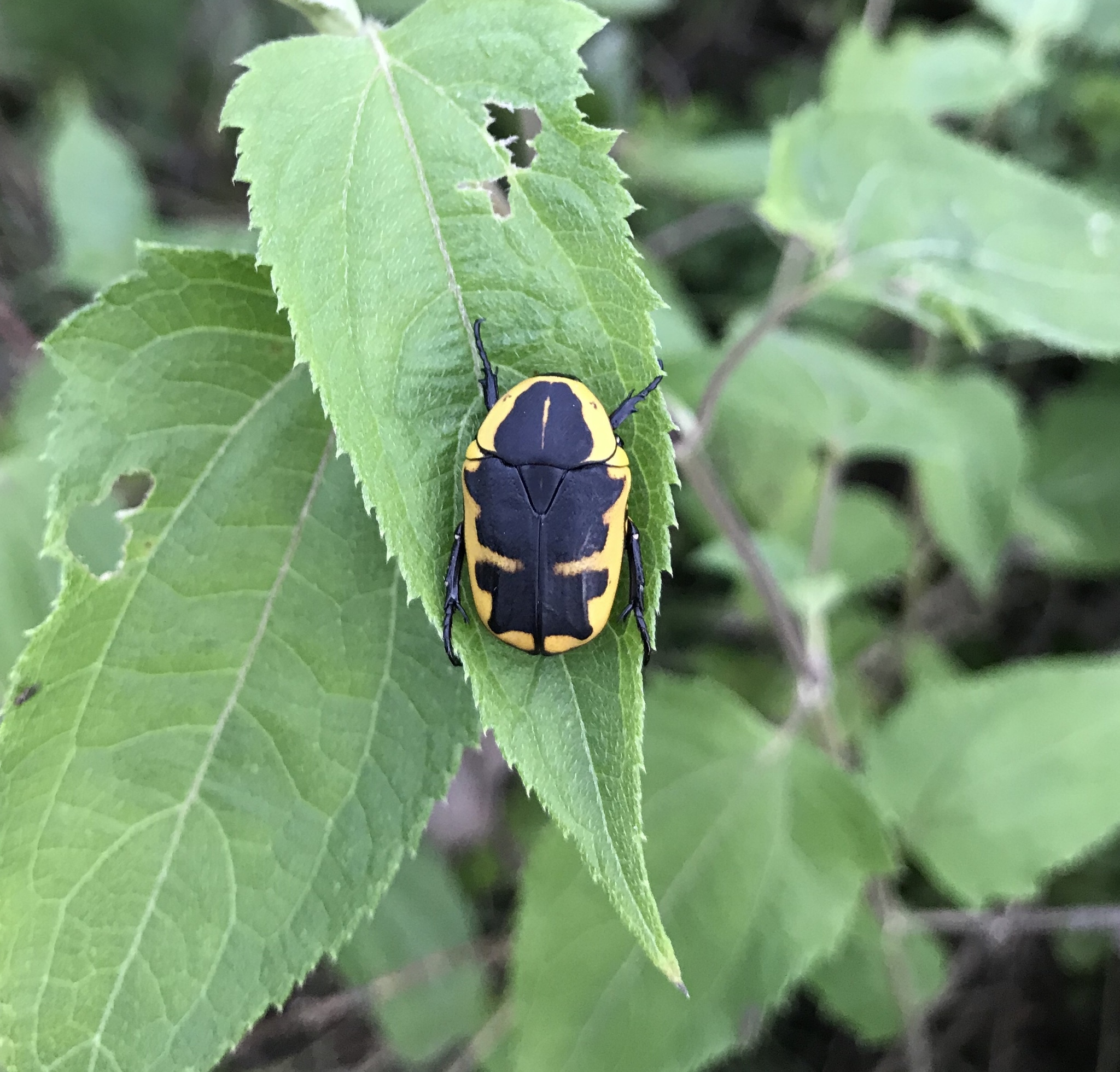

Scientific classification
- Kingdom: Animalia
- Phylum: Arthropoda
- Clade: Pancrustacea
- Class: Insecta
- Order: Coleoptera
- Suborder: Polyphaga
- Infraorder: Scarabaeiformia
- Family: Scarabaeidae
- Genus: Pachnoda
- Species: P. tridentata

Binomial name
- Pachnoda tridentata (Olivier, 1789)

= Pachnoda tridentata =

Species of beetle

Pachnoda tridentata is a species of beetle from the genus Pachnoda. The species was first described in 1789.
