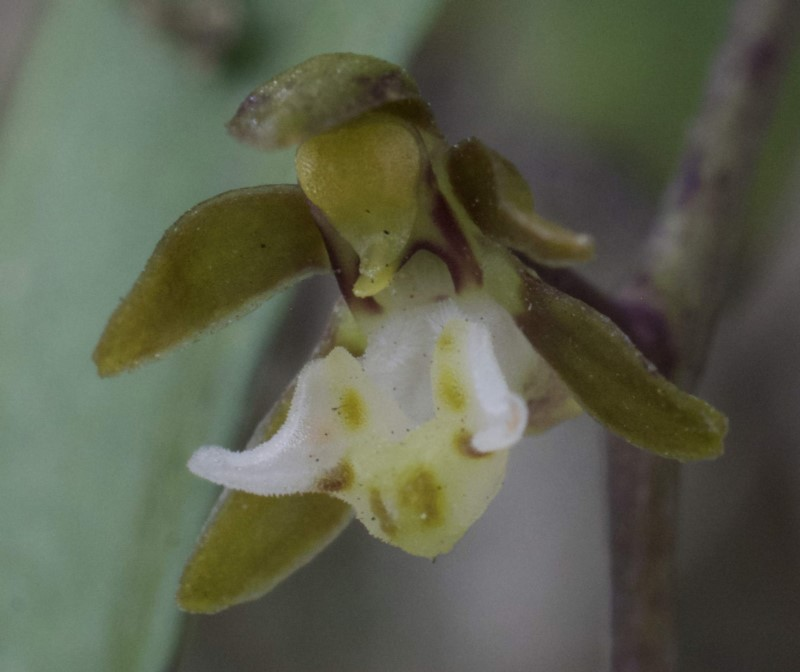
- Near Nowra

Scientific classification
- Kingdom: Plantae
- Clade: Tracheophytes
- Clade: Angiosperms
- Clade: Monocots
- Order: Asparagales
- Family: Orchidaceae
- Subfamily: Epidendroideae
- Genus: Plectorrhiza
- Species: P. tridentata

Binomial name
- Plectorrhiza tridentata (Lindl.) Dockrill

Synonyms
- Cleisostoma cornutum Rupp; Cleisostoma tridenta Lindl. orth. var.; Cleisostoma tridentata Lindl. orth. var.; Cleisostoma tridentatum Lindl.; Saccolabium calcaratum F.Muell.; Sarcanthus tridentatus (Lindl.) Rupp; Sarcochilus calcaratus (F.Muell.) F.Muell.; Sarcochilus tridentatus (Lindl.) Rchb.f.; Sarcochilus tridentatus (Lindl.) Rchb.f. var. tridentatus; Thrixspermum tridentatum (Lindl.) Rchb.f.; Thrixspermum tridentatum (Lindl.) T.E.Hunt isonym

= Plectorrhiza tridentata =

Common tangle orchid

Species of orchid

Plectorrhiza tridentata, commonly known as the common tangle orchid, is an epiphytic or lithophytic orchid that has many coarse, tangled roots, up to twenty narrowly elliptic to egg-shaped or oblong leaves and up to fifteen green or brown, star-shaped flowers with a white labellum. It grows on rainforest trees and in other humid places and occurs between the Daintree National Park in Queensland and the far north-eastern corner of Victoria.

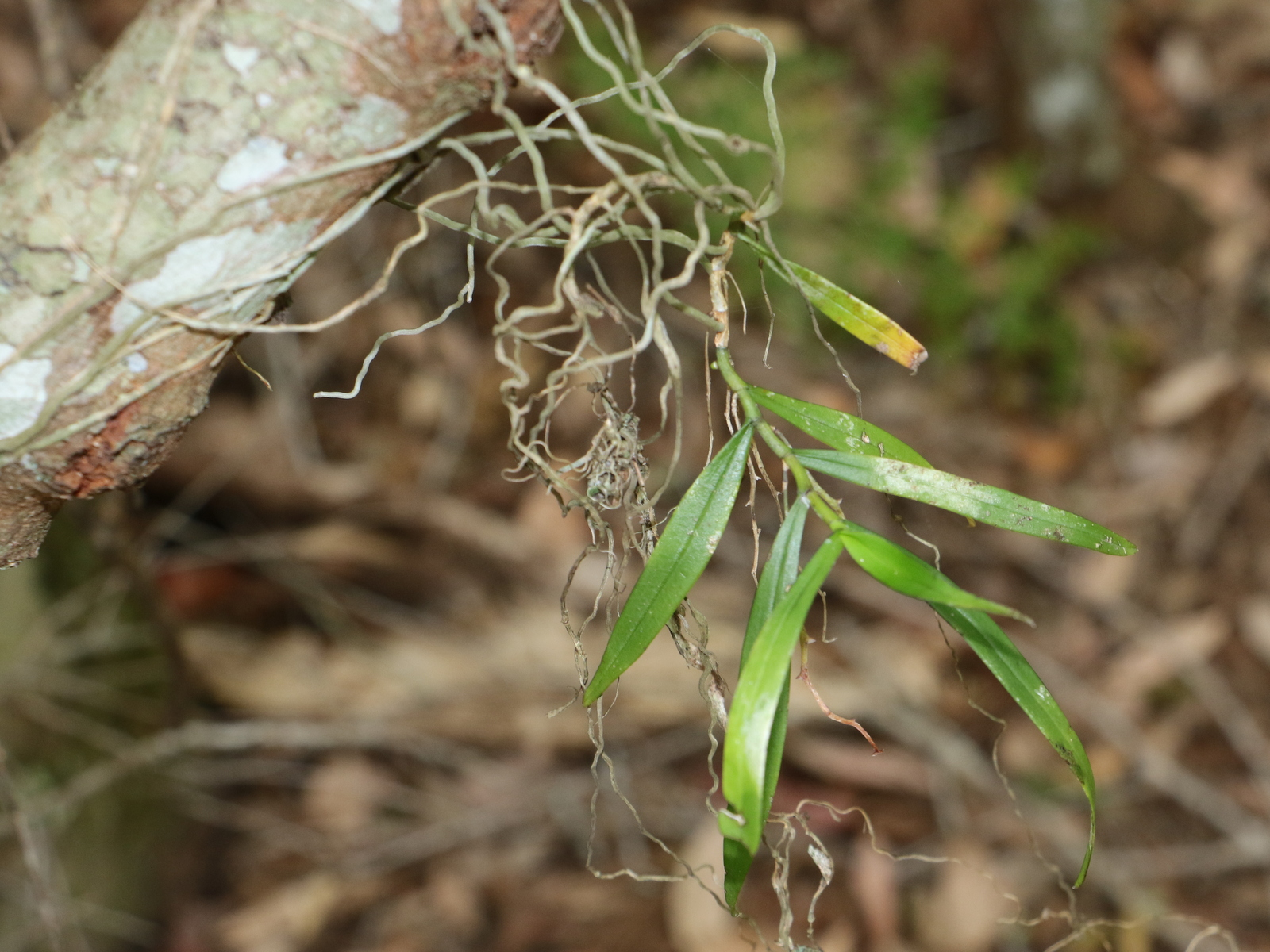
Common tangle orchid habit

== Description ==
Plectorrhiza tridentata is an epiphytic or lithophytic herb with a single main flattened stem, 100–300 millimetres (3.9–12 in) long suspended by one to a few of its many tangled aerial roots. There are between three and twenty green to purplish, leathery, narrowly elliptic to egg-shaped leaves, sometimes with the narrower end towards the base, or oblong, 50–100 millimetres (2.0–3.9 in) long and 10–15 millimetres (0.39–0.59 in) wide. Between three and fifteen green or brown flowers, 5–6 millimetres (0.20–0.24 in) long and 6–8 millimetres (0.24–0.31 in) wide are borne on a pendulous flowering stem 50–120 millimetres (2.0–4.7 in) long. The sepals and petals are free from each other and spread widely apart. The dorsal sepal is 4–5 millimetres (0.16–0.20 in) long, about 2 millimetres (0.079 in) wide and the lateral sepals are slightly longer. The petals are 4–5 millimetres (0.16–0.20 in) long, about 1.5 millimetres (0.059 in) wide. The labellum is white with a green patch, 6–7 millimetres (0.24–0.28 in) long, about 4 millimetres (0.16 in) wide with three lobes. The side lobes are more or less triangular and curve outwards and the middle lobe is blunt with a curved spur about 2 millimetres (0.079 in) long. Flowering occurs from September to January.

== Taxonomy and naming ==
The common tangle orchid was first formally described in 1838 by John Lindley who gave it the name Cleisostoma tridentatum and published the description in Edwards's Botanical Register. In 1967 Alick Dockrill changed the name to Plectorrhiza tridentata. The specific epithet (tridentata) is derived from the Latin word tridens meaning "a fork with three tines".

== Distribution and habitat ==
Plectorrhiza tridentata usually grows on trees in humid places such as deep gullies and swamps. It is found in from the Daintree area in Queensland south along the coast and nearby ranges of New South Wales to rainforest east of the Snowy River in north-eastern Victoria.
