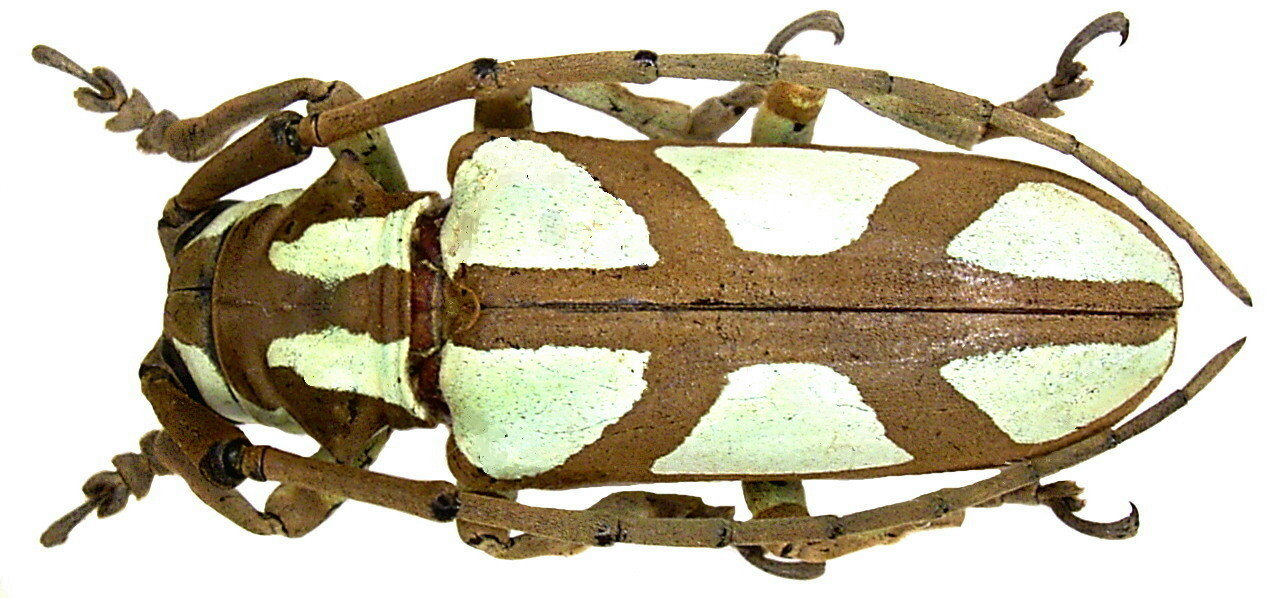
- Prosopocera lactator meridionalis

Scientific classification
- Kingdom: Animalia
- Phylum: Arthropoda
- Class: Insecta
- Order: Coleoptera
- Suborder: Polyphaga
- Infraorder: Cucujiformia
- Family: Cerambycidae
- Subfamily: Lamiinae
- Tribe: Prosopocerini; Thomson, 1868

= Prosopocerini =

Tribe of beetles

Prosopocerini is a tribe of longhorn beetles of the subfamily Lamiinae. It was described by Thomson in 1868.

== Taxonomy ==
- Bangalaia Duvivier, 1890
- Bangaloides Breuning & Téocchi, 1975
- Parabangalaia Breuning, 1946
- Paraprotomocerus Breuning, 1966
- Prosopocera Dejean, 1835
- Protomocerus Gahan, 1898
