= Bangalaia sulcicollis =

Scientific classification
- Kingdom: Animalia
- Phylum: Arthropoda
- Class: Insecta
- Order: Coleoptera
- Suborder: Polyphaga
- Infraorder: Cucujiformia
- Family: Cerambycidae
- Genus: Bangalaia
- Species: B. sulcicollis

Binomial name
- Bangalaia sulcicollis (Kolbe, 1893)

Synonyms
- Alphitopola sulcicollis Kolbe, 1893; Bangalaia olivacea Breuning, 1938; Bangalaia olivacea m. viridegrisea Breuning, 1952; Bangalaia subcallosa Lepesme & Breuning, 1956; Prosopocera (Dalterus) sulcicollis (Kolbe) Breuning, 1962

Species of beetle

Bangalaia sulcicollis is a species of beetle in the family Cerambycidae. It was described by Kolbe in 1893, originally under the genus Alphitopola. It is known from the Ivory Coast, Nigeria, Togo and Sierra Leone.
