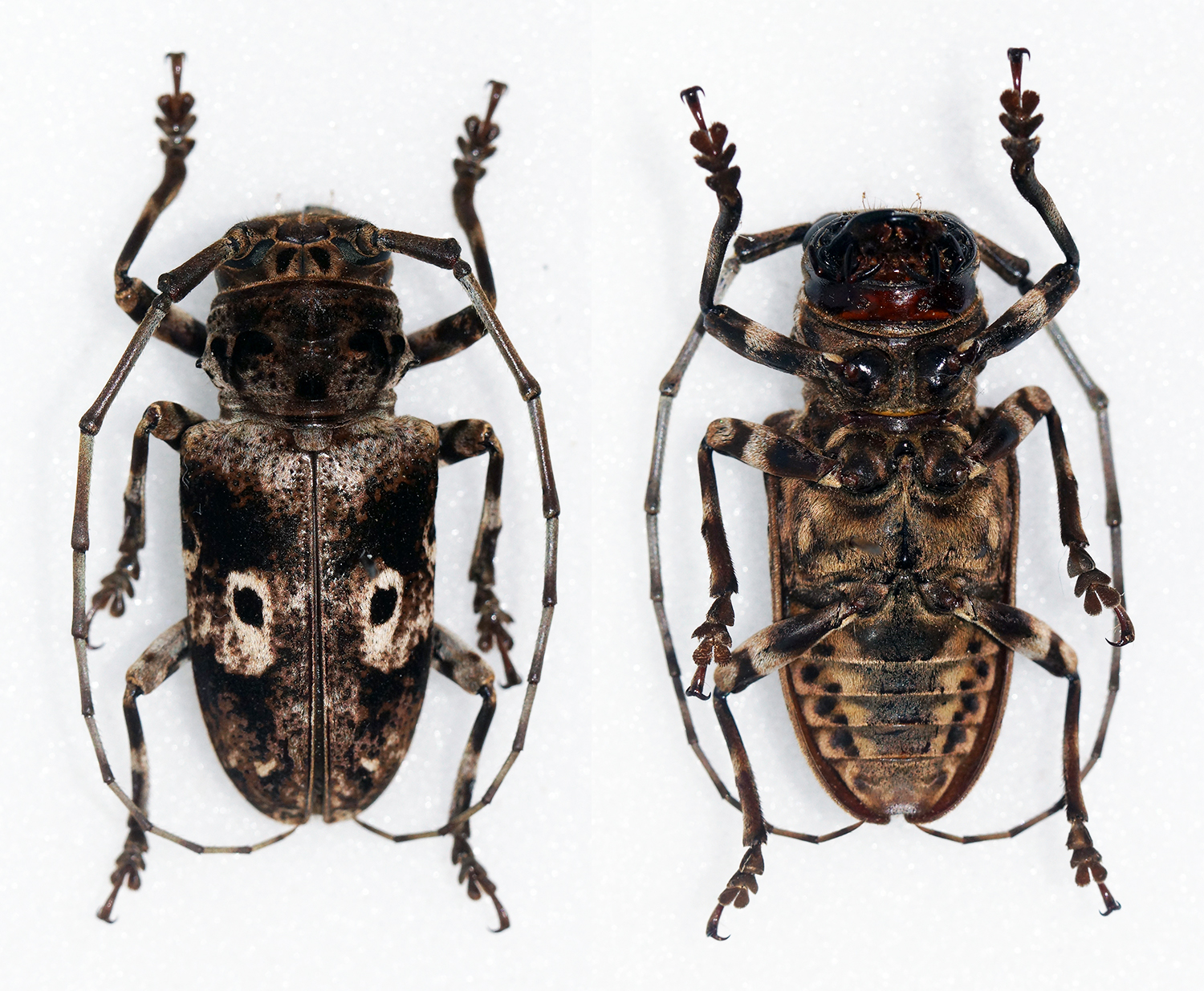

Scientific classification
- Kingdom: Animalia
- Phylum: Arthropoda
- Class: Insecta
- Order: Coleoptera
- Suborder: Polyphaga
- Infraorder: Cucujiformia
- Family: Cerambycidae
- Genus: Prosopocera
- Species: P. schoutedeni

Binomial name
- Prosopocera schoutedeni Breuning, 1936

= Prosopocera schoutedeni =

Species of beetle

Prosopocera schoutedeni is a species of beetle in the family Cerambycidae. It was described by Stephan von Breuning in 1936. It is known from the Democratic Republic of the Congo and Cameroon.
