= Bangalaia angolensis =

Scientific classification
- Kingdom: Animalia
- Phylum: Arthropoda
- Class: Insecta
- Order: Coleoptera
- Suborder: Polyphaga
- Infraorder: Cucujiformia
- Family: Cerambycidae
- Genus: Bangalaia
- Species: B. angolensis

Binomial name
- Bangalaia angolensis Breuning, 1938

Species of beetle

Bangalaia angolensis is a species of beetle in the family Cerambycidae. It was described by Stephan von Breuning in 1938. It is known from Angola.
