= Bangalaia stiriaca =

Scientific classification
- Kingdom: Animalia
- Phylum: Arthropoda
- Class: Insecta
- Order: Coleoptera
- Suborder: Polyphaga
- Infraorder: Cucujiformia
- Family: Cerambycidae
- Genus: Bangalaia
- Species: B. stiriaca

Binomial name
- Bangalaia stiriaca Duvivier, 1890

Species of beetle

Bangalaia stiriaca is a species of beetle in the family Cerambycidae, and the type species of its genus. It was described by Duvivier in 1890. It is known from Nigeria and the Democratic Republic of the Congo.
