= Bangalaia ochreomarmorata =

Scientific classification
- Kingdom: Animalia
- Phylum: Arthropoda
- Class: Insecta
- Order: Coleoptera
- Suborder: Polyphaga
- Infraorder: Cucujiformia
- Family: Cerambycidae
- Genus: Bangalaia
- Species: B. ochreomarmorata

Binomial name
- Bangalaia ochreomarmorata Breuning, 1958

Species of beetle

Bangalaia ochreomarmorata is a species of beetle in the family Cerambycidae. It was described by Stephan von Breuning in 1958. It is known from the Democratic Republic of the Congo.
