= Prosopocera insignis =

Scientific classification
- Domain: Eukaryota
- Kingdom: Animalia
- Phylum: Arthropoda
- Class: Insecta
- Order: Coleoptera
- Suborder: Polyphaga
- Infraorder: Cucujiformia
- Family: Cerambycidae
- Genus: Prosopocera
- Species: P. insignis

Binomial name
- Prosopocera insignis Jordan, 1903

Species of beetle

Prosopocera insignis is a species of beetle in the family Cerambycidae. It was described by Karl Jordan in 1903. It is known from the Central African Republic, the Democratic Republic of the Congo, and Cameroon.
