= Prosopocera escalerai =

Scientific classification
- Domain: Eukaryota
- Kingdom: Animalia
- Phylum: Arthropoda
- Class: Insecta
- Order: Coleoptera
- Suborder: Polyphaga
- Infraorder: Cucujiformia
- Family: Cerambycidae
- Genus: Prosopocera
- Species: P. escalerai

Binomial name
- Prosopocera escalerai Báguena, 1952

Species of beetle

Prosopocera escalerai is a species of beetle in the family Cerambycidae. It was described by Báguena in 1952.
