= Bangalaia wissmanni =

Scientific classification
- Kingdom: Animalia
- Phylum: Arthropoda
- Class: Insecta
- Order: Coleoptera
- Suborder: Polyphaga
- Infraorder: Cucujiformia
- Family: Cerambycidae
- Genus: Bangalaia
- Species: B. wissmanni

Binomial name
- Bangalaia wissmanni (Quedenfeldt, 1888)

Synonyms
- Sternotomiella wissmanni (Quedenfeldt, 1888); Sternotomis wissmanni Quedenfeldt, 1888

Species of beetle

Bangalaia wissmanni is a species of beetle in the family Cerambycidae. It was described by Quedenfeldt in 1888, originally under the genus Sternotomis. It is known from the Democratic Republic of the Congo and Angola.

== Varietas ==
- Bangalaia wissmanni var. confluens (Lepesme, 1952)
- Bangalaia wissmanni var. lanei (Heath, 1905)
