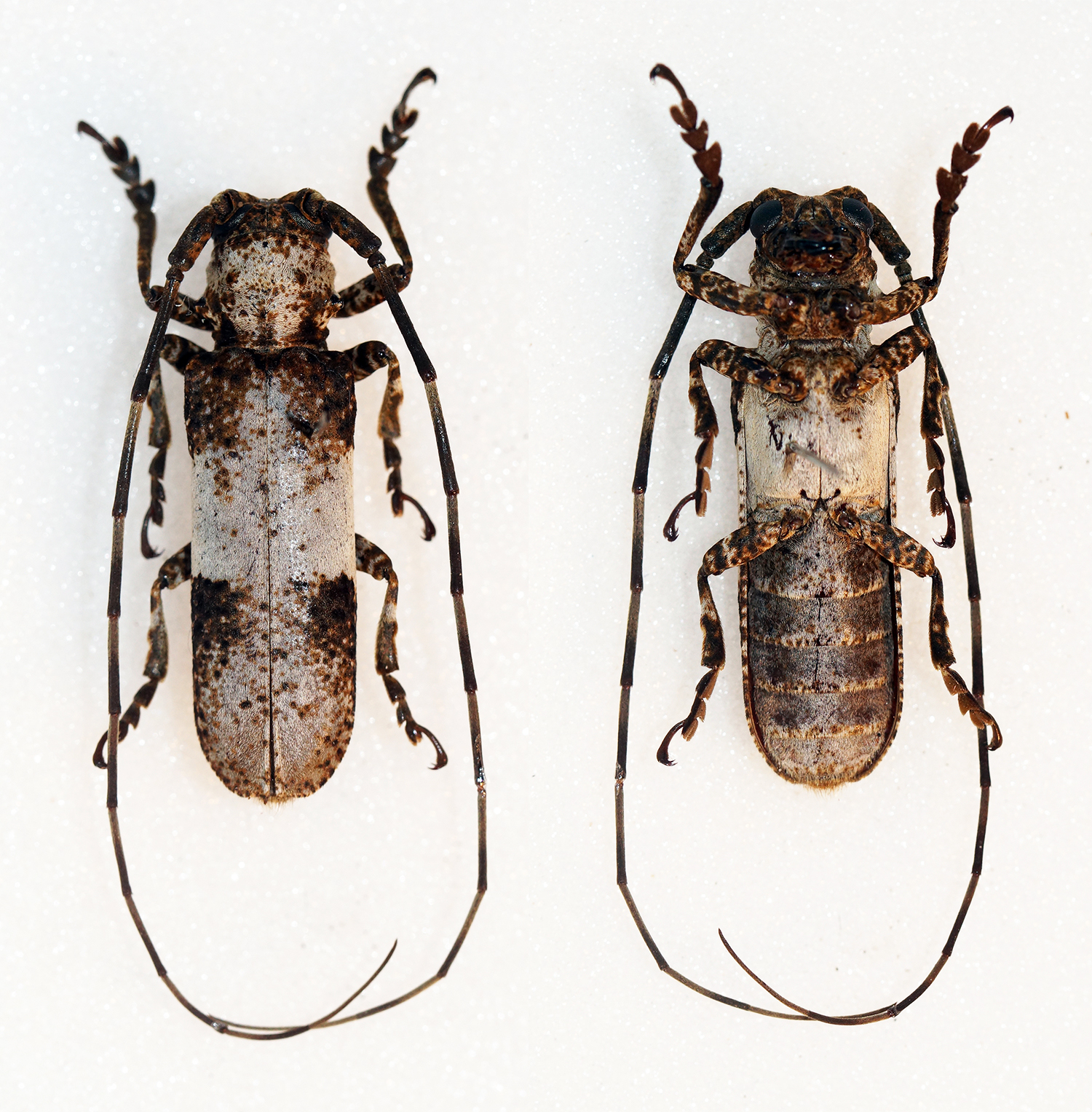

Scientific classification
- Domain: Eukaryota
- Kingdom: Animalia
- Phylum: Arthropoda
- Class: Insecta
- Order: Coleoptera
- Suborder: Polyphaga
- Infraorder: Cucujiformia
- Family: Cerambycidae
- Genus: Prosopocera
- Species: P. callypiga

Binomial name
- Prosopocera callypiga (Thomson, 1857)

Synonyms
- Ceroplesis callypiga Thomson, 1857; Zalates callypiga (Thomson, 1857)

= Prosopocera callypiga =

Species of beetle

Prosopocera callypiga is a species of beetle in the family Cerambycidae. It was described by Thomson in 1857, originally under the genus Ceroplesis. It is known from Tanzania, and possibly South Africa.
