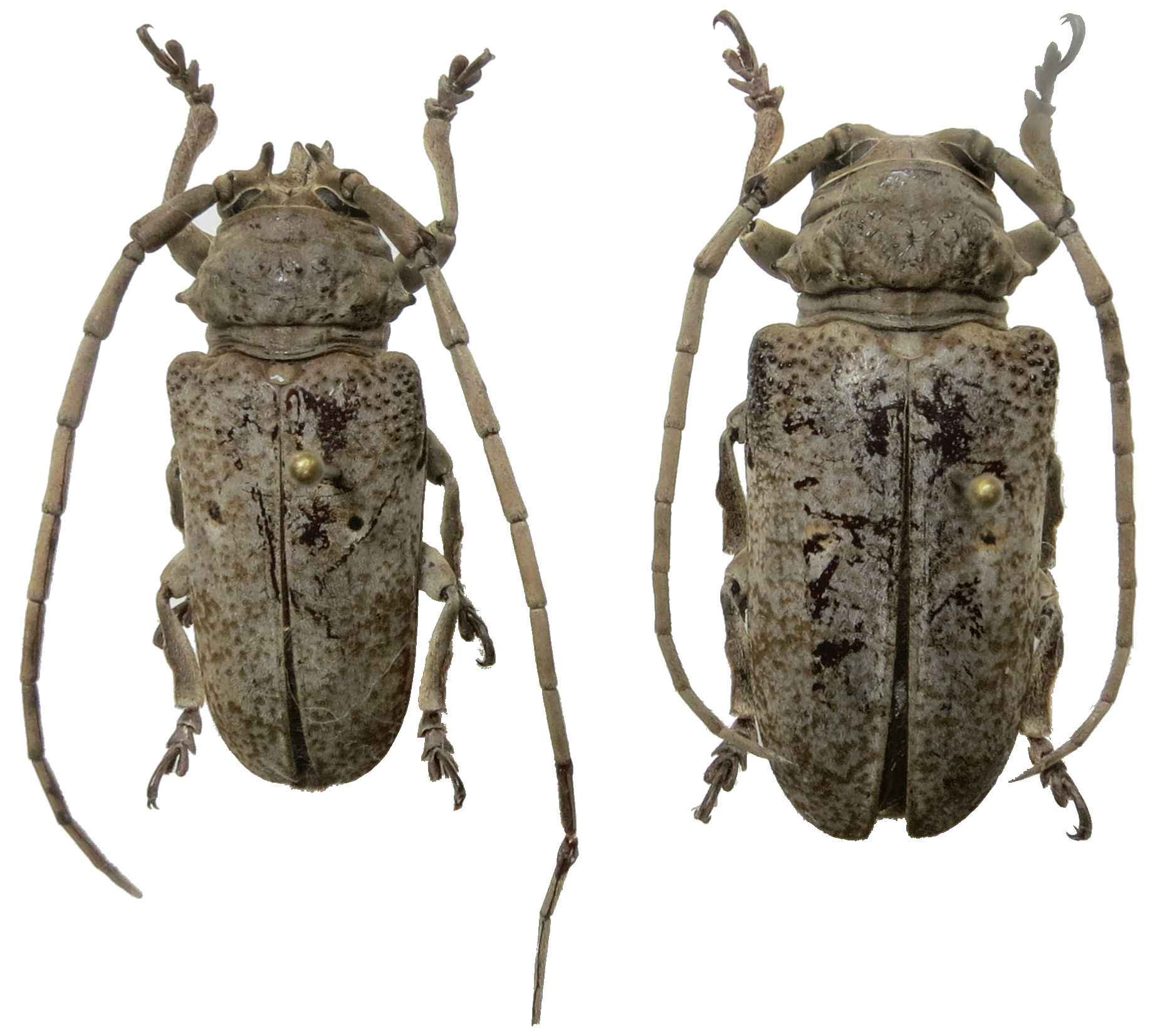
- Prosopocera antennata from Togo

Scientific classification
- Domain: Eukaryota
- Kingdom: Animalia
- Phylum: Arthropoda
- Class: Insecta
- Order: Coleoptera
- Suborder: Polyphaga
- Infraorder: Cucujiformia
- Family: Cerambycidae
- Genus: Prosopocera
- Species: P. antennata

Binomial name
- Prosopocera antennata Gahan, 1890

Synonyms
- Prosopocera falcata Distant, 1898

= Prosopocera antennata =

Species of beetle

Prosopocera antennata is a species of beetle in the family Cerambycidae. It was described by Charles Joseph Gahan in 1890. It has a wide distribution throughout Africa.

== Subspecies ==
- Prosopocera antennata antennata Gahan, 1890
- Prosopocera antennata quadripunctata Aurivillius, 1920
