= Bangalaia babaulti =

Scientific classification
- Kingdom: Animalia
- Phylum: Arthropoda
- Class: Insecta
- Order: Coleoptera
- Suborder: Polyphaga
- Infraorder: Cucujiformia
- Family: Cerambycidae
- Genus: Bangalaia
- Species: B. babaulti

Binomial name
- Bangalaia babaulti (Villiers, 1942)

Synonyms
- Sternotomiella babaulti Villiers, 1942

Species of beetle

Bangalaia babaulti is a species of beetle in the family Cerambycidae. It was described by Villiers in 1942. It is known from the Democratic Republic of the Congo.
