= Bangalaia maublanci =

Scientific classification
- Kingdom: Animalia
- Phylum: Arthropoda
- Class: Insecta
- Order: Coleoptera
- Suborder: Polyphaga
- Infraorder: Cucujiformia
- Family: Cerambycidae
- Genus: Bangalaia
- Species: B. maublanci

Binomial name
- Bangalaia maublanci (Villiers, 1938)

Synonyms
- Sternotomiella maublanci Villiers, 1938

Species of beetle

Bangalaia maublanci is a species of beetle in the family Cerambycidae. It was described by Villiers in 1938, originally under the genus Sternotomiella. It is known from Gabon. It contains the varietas Bangalaia maublanci var. postvittata.
