= Prosopocera fryi =

Scientific classification
- Domain: Eukaryota
- Kingdom: Animalia
- Phylum: Arthropoda
- Class: Insecta
- Order: Coleoptera
- Suborder: Polyphaga
- Infraorder: Cucujiformia
- Family: Cerambycidae
- Genus: Prosopocera
- Species: P. fryi

Binomial name
- Prosopocera fryi Murray, 1871

Synonyms
- Prosopocera ferranti Hintz, 1919

Species of beetle

Prosopocera fryi is a species of beetle in the family Cerambycidae. It was described by Murray in 1871. It is known from Nigeria and the Democratic Republic of the Congo. It contains the varietas Prosopocera fryi var. ochreomaculata.
