= Bangalaia thomensis =

Scientific classification
- Kingdom: Animalia
- Phylum: Arthropoda
- Class: Insecta
- Order: Coleoptera
- Suborder: Polyphaga
- Infraorder: Cucujiformia
- Family: Cerambycidae
- Genus: Bangalaia
- Species: B. thomensis

Binomial name
- Bangalaia thomensis Breuning, 1947

Species of beetle

Bangalaia thomensis is a species of beetle in the family Cerambycidae. It was described by Stephan von Breuning in 1947. It is known from São Tomé and Cameroon.
