= Bangalaia bipunctipennis =

Scientific classification
- Kingdom: Animalia
- Phylum: Arthropoda
- Class: Insecta
- Order: Coleoptera
- Suborder: Polyphaga
- Infraorder: Cucujiformia
- Family: Cerambycidae
- Genus: Bangalaia
- Species: B. bipunctipennis

Binomial name
- Bangalaia bipunctipennis Breuning, 1966

Species of beetle

Bangalaia bipunctipennis is a species of beetle in the family Cerambycidae. It was described by Stephan von Breuning in 1966. It is known from the Democratic Republic of the Congo.
