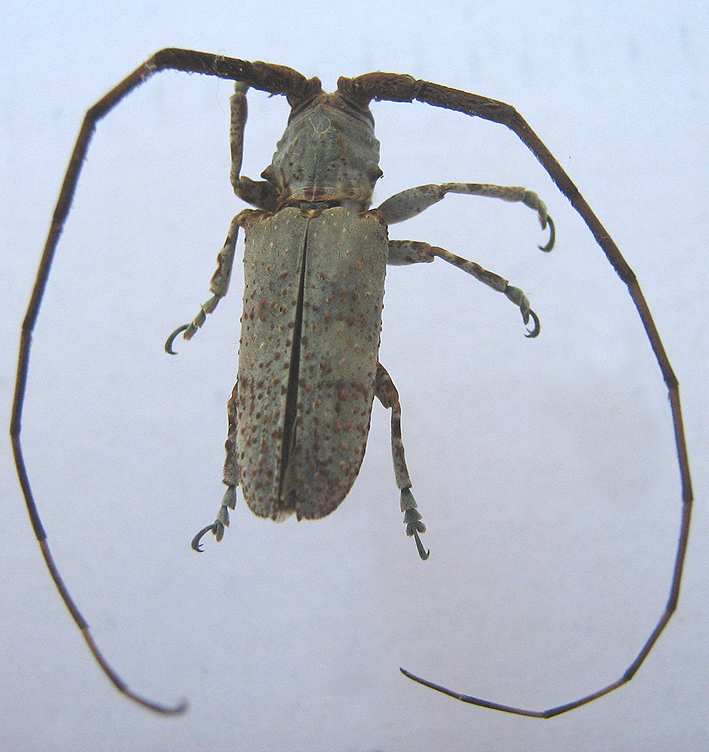

Scientific classification
- Kingdom: Animalia
- Phylum: Arthropoda
- Class: Insecta
- Order: Coleoptera
- Suborder: Polyphaga
- Infraorder: Cucujiformia
- Family: Cerambycidae
- Genus: Protomocerus
- Species: P. pulcher

Binomial name
- Protomocerus pulcher (Péringuey, 1892)

= Protomocerus pulcher =

Species of beetle

Protomocerus pulcher is a species of beetle in the family Cerambycidae. It was described by Péringuey in 1892.
