= Prosopocera pseudotchadensis =

Scientific classification
- Kingdom: Animalia
- Phylum: Arthropoda
- Class: Insecta
- Order: Coleoptera
- Suborder: Polyphaga
- Infraorder: Cucujiformia
- Family: Cerambycidae
- Genus: Prosopocera
- Species: P. pseudotchadensis

Binomial name
- Prosopocera pseudotchadensis Breuning, 1981

Species of beetle

Prosopocera pseudotchadensis is a species of beetle in the family Cerambycidae. It was described by Stephan von Breuning in 1981.
