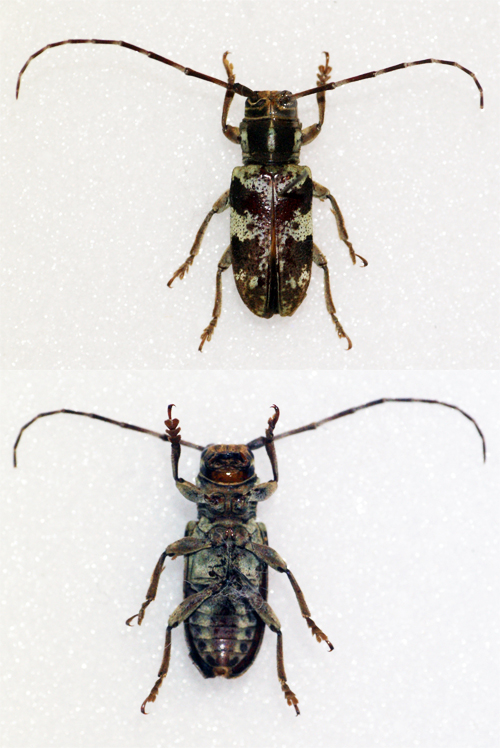

Scientific classification
- Kingdom: Animalia
- Phylum: Arthropoda
- Class: Insecta
- Order: Coleoptera
- Suborder: Polyphaga
- Infraorder: Cucujiformia
- Family: Cerambycidae
- Genus: Bangalaia
- Species: B. ocellata

Binomial name
- Bangalaia ocellata (Lameere, 1893)

Synonyms
- Anybostetha ocellata Lameere, 1893; Bangalaia callosa Aurivillius, 1903; Prosopocera orchymonti Breuning, 1936

= Bangalaia ocellata =

Species of beetle

Bangalaia ocellata is a species of beetle in the family Cerambycidae. It was described by Lameere in 1893, originally under the genus Anybostetha. It is known from the Democratic Republic of the Congo, Cameroon, and the Ivory Coast.
