= Prosopocera usambarica =

Scientific classification
- Kingdom: Animalia
- Phylum: Arthropoda
- Class: Insecta
- Order: Coleoptera
- Suborder: Polyphaga
- Infraorder: Cucujiformia
- Family: Cerambycidae
- Genus: Prosopocera
- Species: P. usambarica

Binomial name
- Prosopocera usambarica Breuning, 1954

Synonyms
- Prosopocera usambarica m. oculata Téocchi, 1991

Species of beetle

Prosopocera usambarica is a species of beetle in the family Cerambycidae. It was described by Stephan von Breuning in 1954.
