= Prosopocera gigantea =

Scientific classification
- Kingdom: Animalia
- Phylum: Arthropoda
- Class: Insecta
- Order: Coleoptera
- Suborder: Polyphaga
- Infraorder: Cucujiformia
- Family: Cerambycidae
- Genus: Prosopocera
- Species: P. gigantea

Binomial name
- Prosopocera gigantea Breuning, 1950

Synonyms
- Prosopocera lydiae Bjornstad & Minetti, 2010

Species of beetle

Prosopocera gigantea is a species of beetle in the family Cerambycidae. It was described by Stephan von Breuning in 1950. It is known from Tanzania and Malawi.
