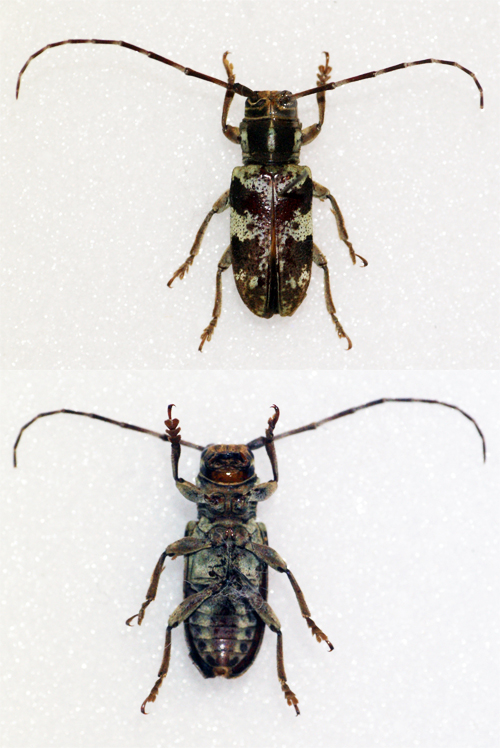
- Bangalaia ocellata

Scientific classification
- Kingdom: Animalia
- Phylum: Arthropoda
- Class: Insecta
- Order: Coleoptera
- Suborder: Polyphaga
- Infraorder: Cucujiformia
- Family: Cerambycidae
- Subfamily: Lamiinae
- Tribe: Prosopocerini
- Genus: Bangalaia; Duvivier, 1890

= Bangalaia =

Genus of beetles

Bangalaia is a genus of longhorn beetles of the subfamily Lamiinae, containing the following species:

- Bangalaia albata (Thomson, 1868)
- Bangalaia alboguttata Breuning, 1936
- Bangalaia angolensis Breuning, 1938
- Bangalaia babaulti (Villiers, 1942)
- Bangalaia bipunctipennis Breuning, 1966
- Bangalaia camerunica Breuning, 1974
- Bangalaia chaerila Jordan, 1903
- Bangalaia duffyi Breuning, 1962
- Bangalaia fisheri Breuning, 1936
- Bangalaia fulvosignata (Quedenfeldt, 1882)
- Bangalaia lislei Villiers, 1941
- Bangalaia margaretae Gilmour, 1956
- Bangalaia maublanci (Villiers, 1938)
- Bangalaia molitor Jordan, 1903
- Bangalaia nebulosa (Quedenfeldt, 1887)
- Bangalaia ocellata (Lameere, 1893)
- Bangalaia ochreomarmorata Breuning, 1958
- Bangalaia soror Jordan, 1903
- Bangalaia stiriaca Duvivier, 1890
- Bangalaia sulcicollis (Kolbe, 1893)
- Bangalaia thomensis Breuning, 1947
- Bangalaia vittata Jordan, 1903
- Bangalaia wissmanni (Quedenfeldt, 1888)
