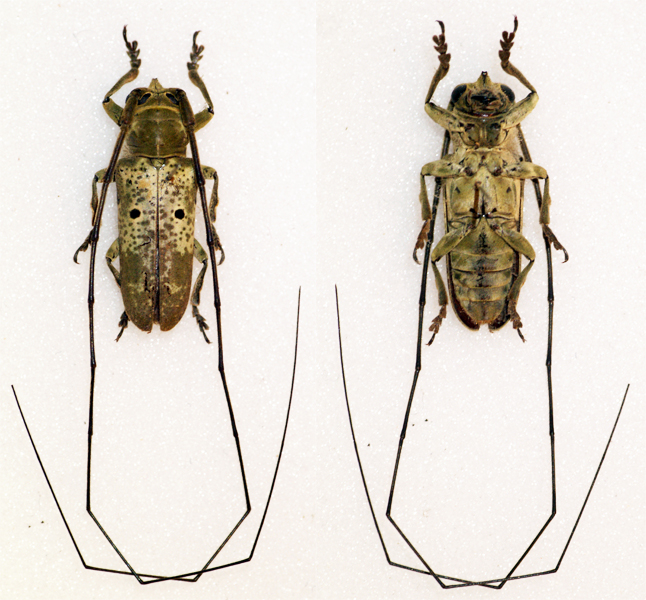

Scientific classification
- Domain: Eukaryota
- Kingdom: Animalia
- Phylum: Arthropoda
- Class: Insecta
- Order: Coleoptera
- Suborder: Polyphaga
- Infraorder: Cucujiformia
- Family: Cerambycidae
- Genus: Prosopocera
- Species: P. cylindrica

Binomial name
- Prosopocera cylindrica Aurivillius, 1903

= Prosopocera cylindrica =

Species of beetle

Prosopocera cylindrica is a species of beetle in the family Cerambycidae. It was described by Per Olof Christopher Aurivillius in 1903. It is known from the Democratic Republic of the Congo and Cameroon.
