= Prosopocera francoisiana =

Scientific classification
- Kingdom: Animalia
- Phylum: Arthropoda
- Class: Insecta
- Order: Coleoptera
- Suborder: Polyphaga
- Infraorder: Cucujiformia
- Family: Cerambycidae
- Genus: Prosopocera
- Species: P. francoisiana

Binomial name
- Prosopocera francoisiana Lepesme, 1948

Species of beetle

Prosopocera francoisiana is a species of beetle in the family Cerambycidae. It was described by Lepesme in 1948.
