= Bangalaia lislei =

Scientific classification
- Kingdom: Animalia
- Phylum: Arthropoda
- Class: Insecta
- Order: Coleoptera
- Suborder: Polyphaga
- Infraorder: Cucujiformia
- Family: Cerambycidae
- Genus: Bangalaia
- Species: B. lislei

Binomial name
- Bangalaia lislei Villiers, 1941

Synonyms
- Bangalaia lisleyi (Villiers) Breuning, 1959 (misspelling)

Species of beetle

Bangalaia lislei is a species of beetle in the family Cerambycidae. It was described by Villiers in 1941. It is known from Cameroon.
