= Bangalaia nebulosa =

Scientific classification
- Kingdom: Animalia
- Phylum: Arthropoda
- Class: Insecta
- Order: Coleoptera
- Suborder: Polyphaga
- Infraorder: Cucujiformia
- Family: Cerambycidae
- Genus: Bangalaia
- Species: B. nebulosa

Binomial name
- Bangalaia nebulosa (Quedenfeldt, 1887)

Synonyms
- Agnitogaster variegatus Jordan, 1894; Anoplostetha nebulosa Quedenfeldt, 1887; Anybostheta quedenfeldti Duvivier, 1892; Prosopocera vaneyeni Breuning, 1951

Species of beetle

Bangalaia nebulosa is a species of beetle in the family Cerambycidae. It was described by Quedenfeldt in 1887, originally under the genus Anoplostetha. It is known from the Ivory Coast, the Central African Republic, Guinea, the Democratic Republic of the Congo, Equatorial Guinea, Angola, Gabon, Senegal, Cameroon, and Uganda.
