= Bangalaia albata =

Scientific classification
- Kingdom: Animalia
- Phylum: Arthropoda
- Class: Insecta
- Order: Coleoptera
- Suborder: Polyphaga
- Infraorder: Cucujiformia
- Family: Cerambycidae
- Genus: Bangalaia
- Species: B. albata

Binomial name
- Bangalaia albata (Thomson, 1868)

Synonyms
- Agnitogaster fasciatus Jordan, 1894; Bangalaia schoutedeni Breuning, 1936; Hierogyna albata Thomson, 1868

Species of beetle

Bangalaia albata is a species of beetle in the family Cerambycidae. It was described by James Thomson in 1868. It is found in Nigeria, Sierra Leone, and the Democratic Republic of the Congo.
