= Prosopocera viridegrisea =

Scientific classification
- Domain: Eukaryota
- Kingdom: Animalia
- Phylum: Arthropoda
- Class: Insecta
- Order: Coleoptera
- Suborder: Polyphaga
- Infraorder: Cucujiformia
- Family: Cerambycidae
- Genus: Prosopocera
- Species: P. viridegrisea

Binomial name
- Prosopocera viridegrisea Hintz, 1911

Species of beetle

Prosopocera viridegrisea is a species of beetle in the family Cerambycidae. It was described by Hintz in 1911. It is known from Kenya, the Democratic Republic of the Congo, and Gabon.

== Subspecies ==
- Prosopocera viridegrisea kenyana Breuning, 1958
- Prosopocera viridegrisea viridegrisea Hintz, 1911
