= Protomocerus gregorii =

Scientific classification
- Domain: Eukaryota
- Kingdom: Animalia
- Phylum: Arthropoda
- Class: Insecta
- Order: Coleoptera
- Suborder: Polyphaga
- Infraorder: Cucujiformia
- Family: Cerambycidae
- Genus: Protomocerus
- Species: P. gregorii

Binomial name
- Protomocerus gregorii Gahan, 1898

Species of beetle

Protomocerus gregorii is a species of beetle in the family Cerambycidae. It was described by Charles Joseph Gahan in 1898.
