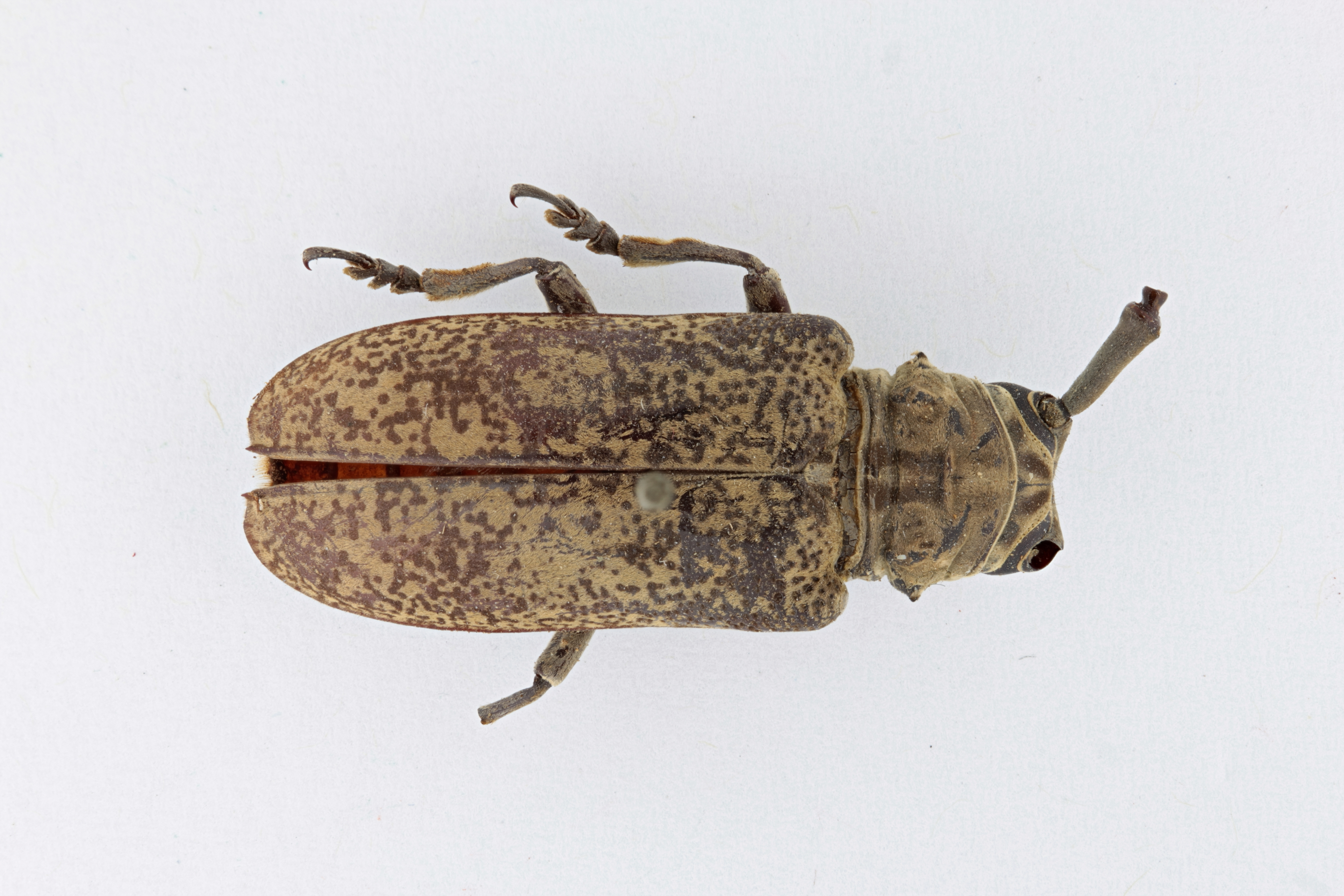

Scientific classification
- Domain: Eukaryota
- Kingdom: Animalia
- Phylum: Arthropoda
- Class: Insecta
- Order: Coleoptera
- Suborder: Polyphaga
- Infraorder: Cucujiformia
- Family: Cerambycidae
- Genus: Prosopocera
- Species: P. valida

Binomial name
- Prosopocera valida Aurivillius, 1927

= Prosopocera valida =

Species of beetle

Prosopocera valida is a species of beetle in the family Cerambycidae. It was described by Per Olof Christopher Aurivillius in 1927. It is known from Sierra Leone and the Democratic Republic of the Congo.
