= Prosopocera albovestita =

Scientific classification
- Kingdom: Animalia
- Phylum: Arthropoda
- Class: Insecta
- Order: Coleoptera
- Suborder: Polyphaga
- Infraorder: Cucujiformia
- Family: Cerambycidae
- Genus: Prosopocera
- Species: P. albovestita

Binomial name
- Prosopocera albovestita Breuning, 1936

Species of beetle

Prosopocera albovestita is a species of beetle in the family Cerambycidae. It was described by Stephan von Breuning in 1936. It is known from the Democratic Republic of the Congo.

These beetles are usually associated with wooded areas where the larvae feed on dead or dying wood, playing an important role in the decomposition process and the nutrient cycle within their ecosystems.

The “albovestita” part of its name suggests a characteristic feature related to its appearance, such as having a white (“albo”) vest-like pattern or covering, but for precise details about its morphology, behavior, and ecology, it would be beneficial to consult specific entomological resources or scientific literature dedicated to the Cerambycidae.

As with many insects, understanding the roles of species like Prosopocera albovestita contributes to our knowledge of biodiversity, ecosystem health, and the potential impacts of environmental changes on species distribution and conservation status.
