= Bangalaia fisheri =

Scientific classification
- Kingdom: Animalia
- Phylum: Arthropoda
- Class: Insecta
- Order: Coleoptera
- Suborder: Polyphaga
- Infraorder: Cucujiformia
- Family: Cerambycidae
- Genus: Bangalaia
- Species: B. fisheri

Binomial name
- Bangalaia fisheri Breuning, 1936

Species of beetle

Bangalaia fisheri is a species of beetle in the family Cerambycidae. It was described by Stephan von Breuning in 1936. It is known from Gabon, the Ivory Coast, and Equatorial Guinea.
