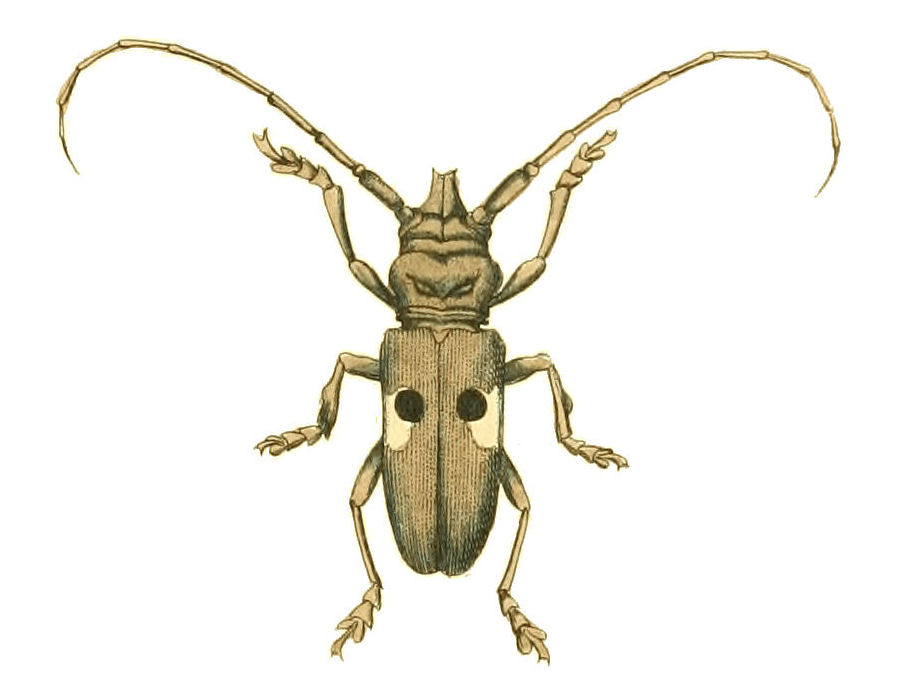

Scientific classification
- Domain: Eukaryota
- Kingdom: Animalia
- Phylum: Arthropoda
- Class: Insecta
- Order: Coleoptera
- Suborder: Polyphaga
- Infraorder: Cucujiformia
- Family: Cerambycidae
- Genus: Prosopocera
- Species: P. bipunctata

Binomial name
- Prosopocera bipunctata (Drury, 1773)

Synonyms
- Cerambyx bipunctatus Drury, 1773; Cerambyx notatus Voet, 1778; Lamia fronticornis Fabricius, 1781; Prosopocera ocellata Chevrolat, 1857; Prosopocera blairi Breuning, 1936

= Prosopocera bipunctata =

Species of beetle

Prosopocera bipunctata is a species of flat-faced longhorn beetles in the subfamily Lamiinae. It was first described by Dru Drury in 1773, from Sierra Leone.

== Description ==
General colour brownish grey. Head deep and grey; one of the sexes having a remarkable thick and strong tubercle issuing from the middle of the face, terminating in two black acute angles, like horns. Mouth armed with two strong black jaws, and four grey palpi. Antennae grey, and longer than the insect. Thorax grey, the sides terminating in a thick spine; having a broad, white streak crossing it on each side, and extending along the abdomen, beyond the middle legs, narrowing to its extremity. Scutellum small and triangular. Elytra grey and margined, having two round black spots on each, the largest placed about the middle near the suture; the other (a small one) is on this side joined to the margin. A cream-coloured spot is situated just below the former, which extends from thence to the lateral margin. Legs grey, without any spines or marks. Body length 1¼ inches (32 mm).
