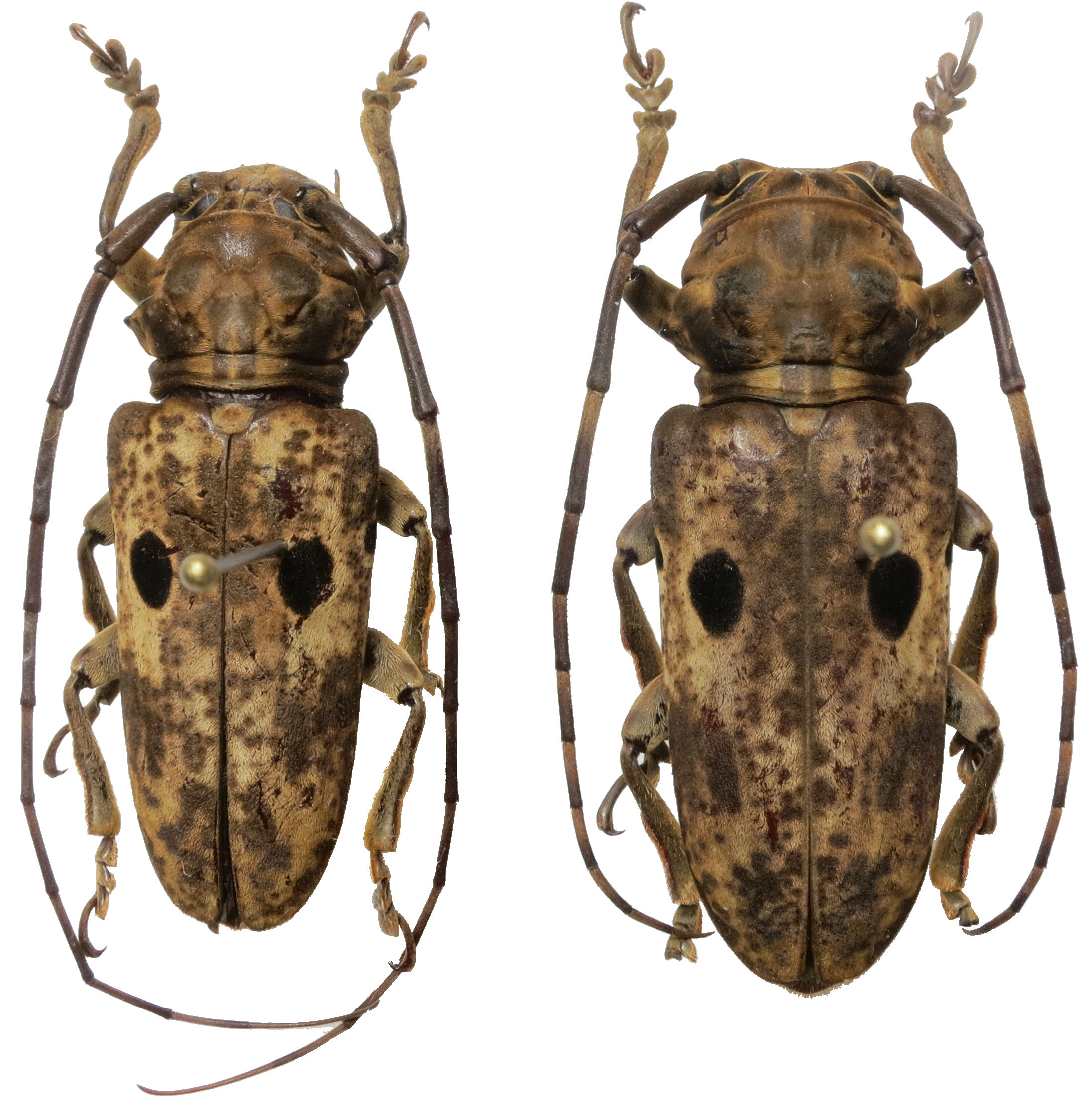
- Prosopocera signatifrons from Togo

Scientific classification
- Domain: Eukaryota
- Kingdom: Animalia
- Phylum: Arthropoda
- Class: Insecta
- Order: Coleoptera
- Suborder: Polyphaga
- Infraorder: Cucujiformia
- Family: Cerambycidae
- Genus: Prosopocera
- Species: P. signatifrons

Binomial name
- Prosopocera signatifrons Duvivier, 1891

= Prosopocera signatifrons =

Species of beetle

Prosopocera signatifrons is a species of beetle in the family Cerambycidae. It was described by Duvivier in 1891. It is known from Ghana, Togo, and the Democratic Republic of the Congo.
