= Bangalaia alboguttata =

Scientific classification
- Kingdom: Animalia
- Phylum: Arthropoda
- Class: Insecta
- Order: Coleoptera
- Suborder: Polyphaga
- Infraorder: Cucujiformia
- Family: Cerambycidae
- Genus: Bangalaia
- Species: B. alboguttata

Binomial name
- Bangalaia alboguttata Breuning, 1936

Species of beetle

Bangalaia alboguttata is a species of beetle in the family Cerambycidae. It was described by Stephan von Breuning in 1936. It is known from the Democratic Republic of the Congo and Cameroon. It contains the varietas Bangalaia alboguttata var. grisea.
