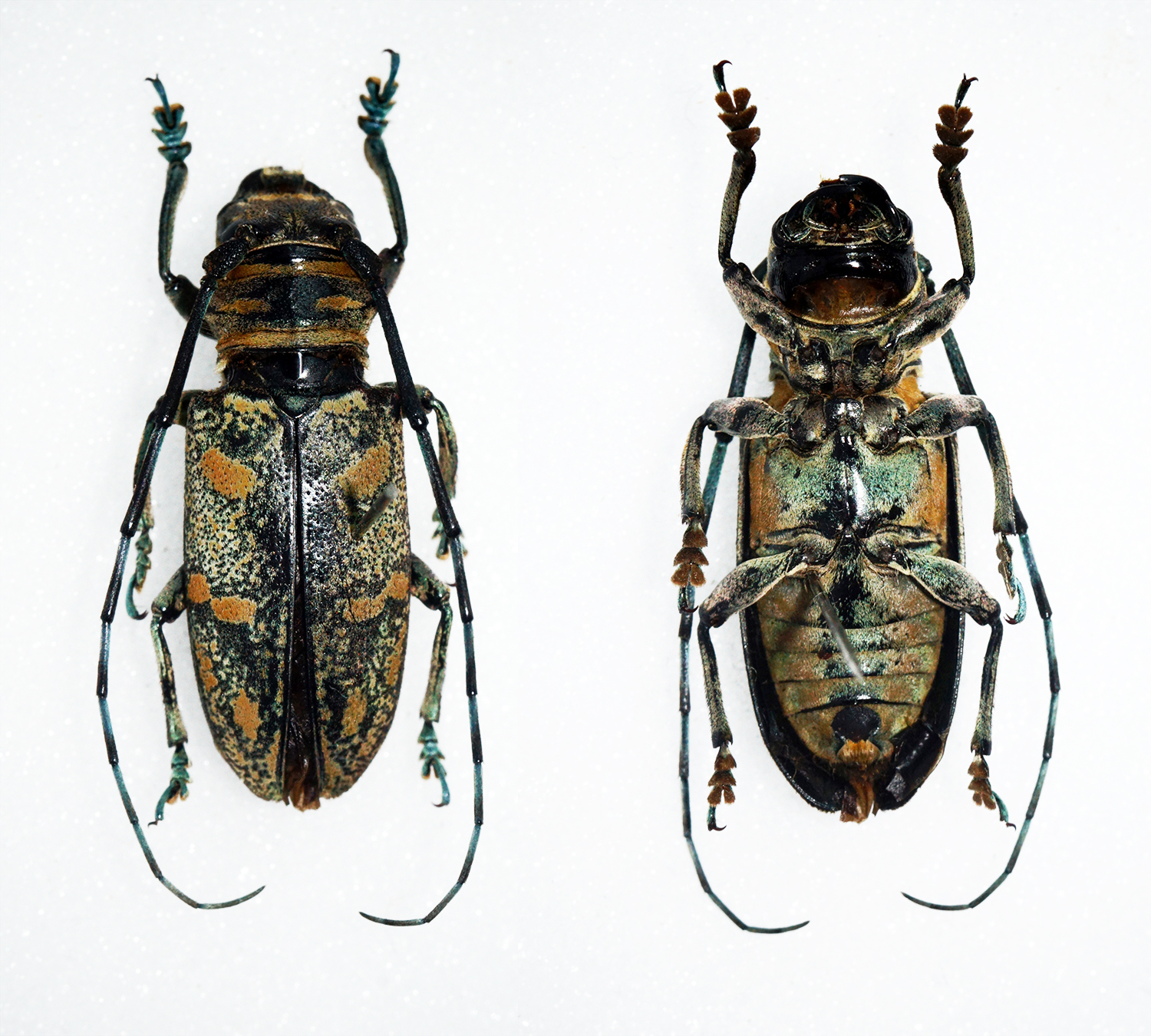

Scientific classification
- Kingdom: Animalia
- Phylum: Arthropoda
- Class: Insecta
- Order: Coleoptera
- Suborder: Polyphaga
- Infraorder: Cucujiformia
- Family: Cerambycidae
- Genus: Bangalaia
- Species: B. fulvosignata

Binomial name
- Bangalaia fulvosignata (Quedenfeldt, 1882)

Synonyms
- Sternotomiella fulvosignata (Quedenfeldt, 1882); Sternotomiella fulvosignata m. obliquemaculata Allard, 1993; Sternotomiella fulvosignata m. unimaculata Allard, 1993; Sternotomis fulvosignata Quedenfeldt, 1882

= Bangalaia fulvosignata =

Species of beetle

Bangalaia fulvosignata is a species of beetle in the family Cerambycidae, and the type species of its genus. It was described by Quedenfeldt in 1882, originally under the genus Sternotomis. It is known from Gabon, the Democratic Republic of the Congo, Angola, Equatorial Guinea, Cameroon, and the Republic of the Congo.
