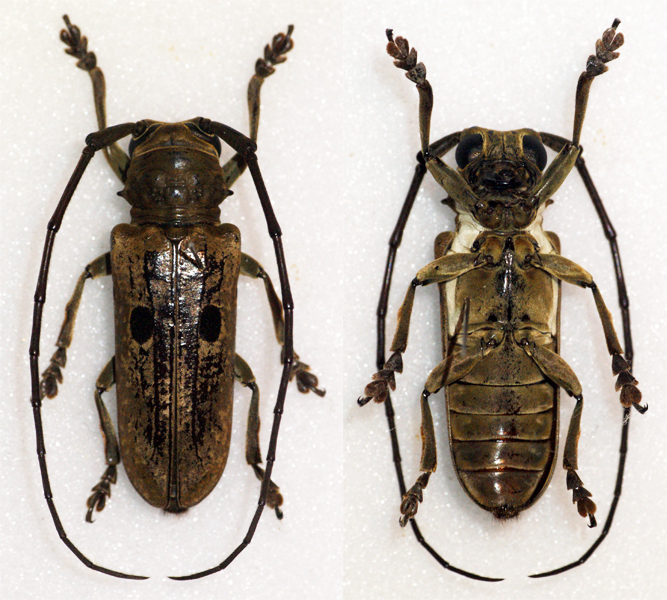

Scientific classification
- Domain: Eukaryota
- Kingdom: Animalia
- Phylum: Arthropoda
- Class: Insecta
- Order: Coleoptera
- Suborder: Polyphaga
- Infraorder: Cucujiformia
- Family: Cerambycidae
- Genus: Prosopocera
- Species: P. myops

Binomial name
- Prosopocera myops Chevrolat, 1855

Synonyms
- Prosopocera consanguis Aurivillius, 1913

= Prosopocera myops =

Species of beetle

Prosopocera myops is a species of beetle in the family Cerambycidae. It was described by Louis Alexandre Auguste Chevrolat in 1855. It is known from Nigeria, the Ivory Coast, the Republic of the Congo, the Democratic Republic of the Congo, and Sierra Leone.

== Varietas ==
- Prosopocera myops var. dorsalis Chevrolat, 1858
- Prosopocera myops var. foxcrofti (Pascoe, 1864)
