= Prosopocera undulata =

Scientific classification
- Domain: Eukaryota
- Kingdom: Animalia
- Phylum: Arthropoda
- Class: Insecta
- Order: Coleoptera
- Suborder: Polyphaga
- Infraorder: Cucujiformia
- Family: Cerambycidae
- Genus: Prosopocera
- Species: P. undulata

Binomial name
- Prosopocera undulata Schwarzer, 1929

Synonyms
- Megaloharpya lequeuxi Allard, 1993

Species of beetle

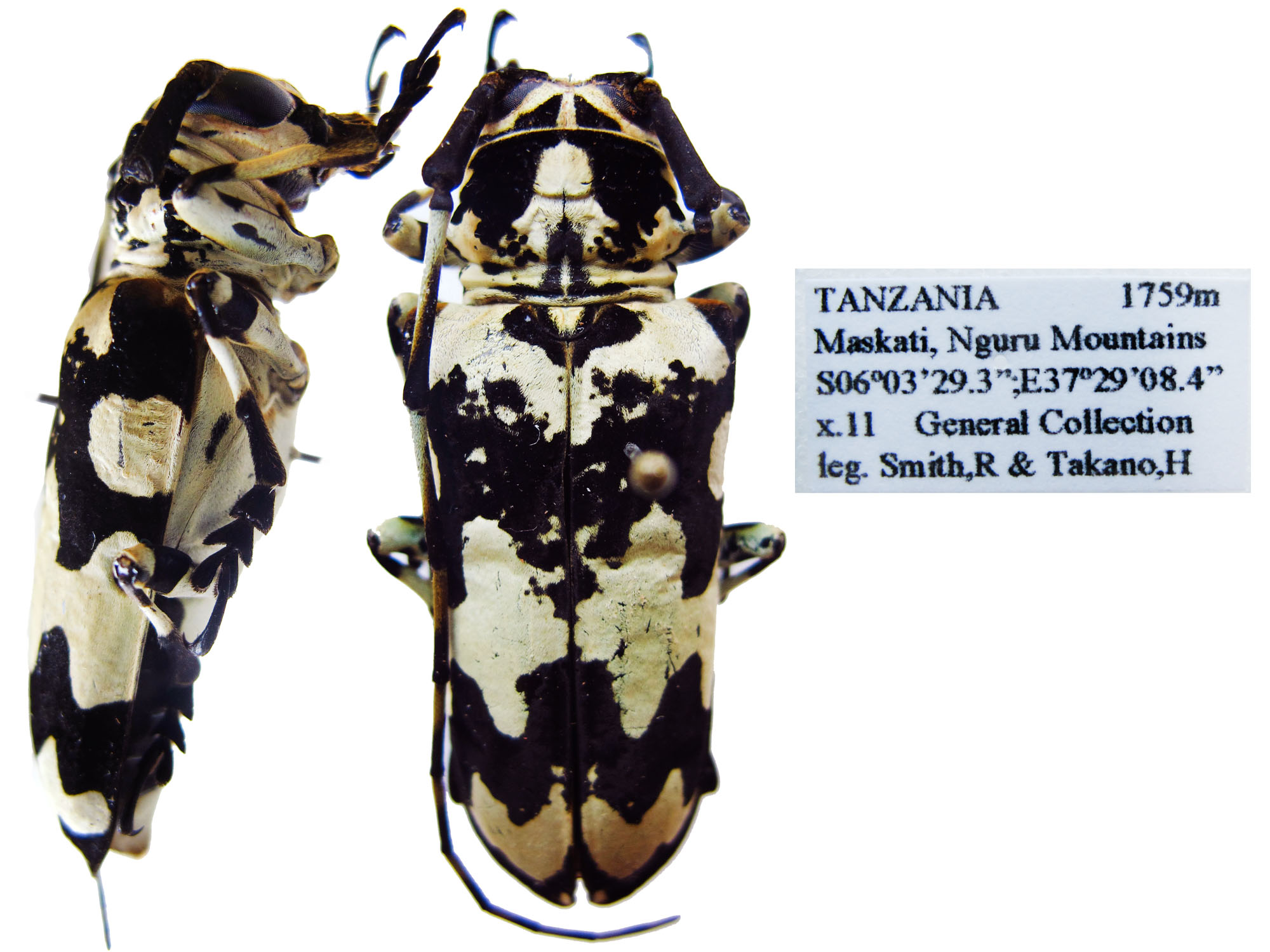

Prosopocera undulata is a species of beetle in the family Cerambycidae. It was described by Schwarzer in 1929. It is known from Tanzania and Malawi.
