= Prosopocera alboplagiata =

Scientific classification
- Domain: Eukaryota
- Kingdom: Animalia
- Phylum: Arthropoda
- Class: Insecta
- Order: Coleoptera
- Suborder: Polyphaga
- Infraorder: Cucujiformia
- Family: Cerambycidae
- Genus: Prosopocera
- Species: P. alboplagiata

Binomial name
- Prosopocera alboplagiata Jordan, 1894

Species of beetle

Prosopocera alboplagiata is a species of beetle in the family Cerambycidae. It was described by Karl Jordan in 1894. It is known from Sierra Leone and Ghana.
