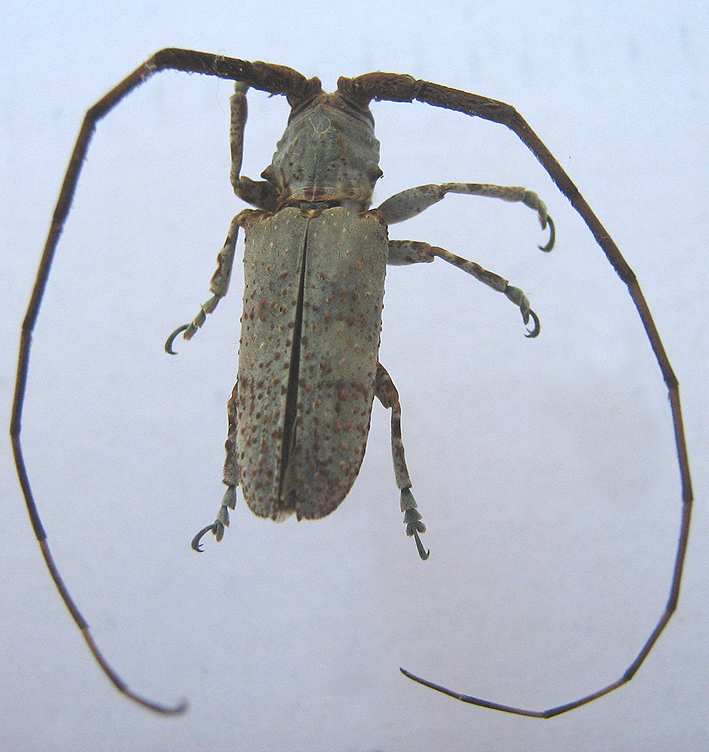
- Protomocerus pulcher in Botswana

Scientific classification
- Domain: Eukaryota
- Kingdom: Animalia
- Phylum: Arthropoda
- Class: Insecta
- Order: Coleoptera
- Suborder: Polyphaga
- Infraorder: Cucujiformia
- Family: Cerambycidae
- Tribe: Prosopocerini
- Genus: Protomocerus

= Protomocerus =

Genus of beetles

Protomocerus is a genus of longhorn beetles of the subfamily Lamiinae, containing the following species:

- Protomocerus gregorii Gahan, 1898
- Protomocerus pulcher (Péringuey, 1892)
