= Prosopocera belzebuth =

Scientific classification
- Domain: Eukaryota
- Kingdom: Animalia
- Phylum: Arthropoda
- Class: Insecta
- Order: Coleoptera
- Suborder: Polyphaga
- Infraorder: Cucujiformia
- Family: Cerambycidae
- Genus: Prosopocera
- Species: P. belzebuth

Binomial name
- Prosopocera belzebuth Thomson, 1857

Synonyms
- Imalmus capito Pascoe, 1864; Prosopocera umbrina (Hintz)

Species of beetle

Prosopocera belzebuth is a species of beetle in the family Cerambycidae. It was described by James Thomson in 1857. It is known from Nigeria, the Ivory Coast, Togo, Senegal, the Central African Republic, and the Democratic Republic of the Congo.

== Subspecies ==
- Prosopocera belzebuth belzebuth Thomson, 1857
- Prosopocera belzebuth hintzi Aurivillius, 1922
- Prosopocera belzebuth infravalida Breuning, 1970
