= Prosopocera subvalida =

Scientific classification
- Kingdom: Animalia
- Phylum: Arthropoda
- Class: Insecta
- Order: Coleoptera
- Suborder: Polyphaga
- Infraorder: Cucujiformia
- Family: Cerambycidae
- Genus: Prosopocera
- Species: P. subvalida

Binomial name
- Prosopocera subvalida Breuning, 1954

Species of beetle

Prosopocera subvalida is a species of beetle in the family Cerambycidae. It was described by Stephan von Breuning in 1954. It is known from the Democratic Republic of Congo. It measures between 33 and 36 mm (1.3 and 1.4 in).
