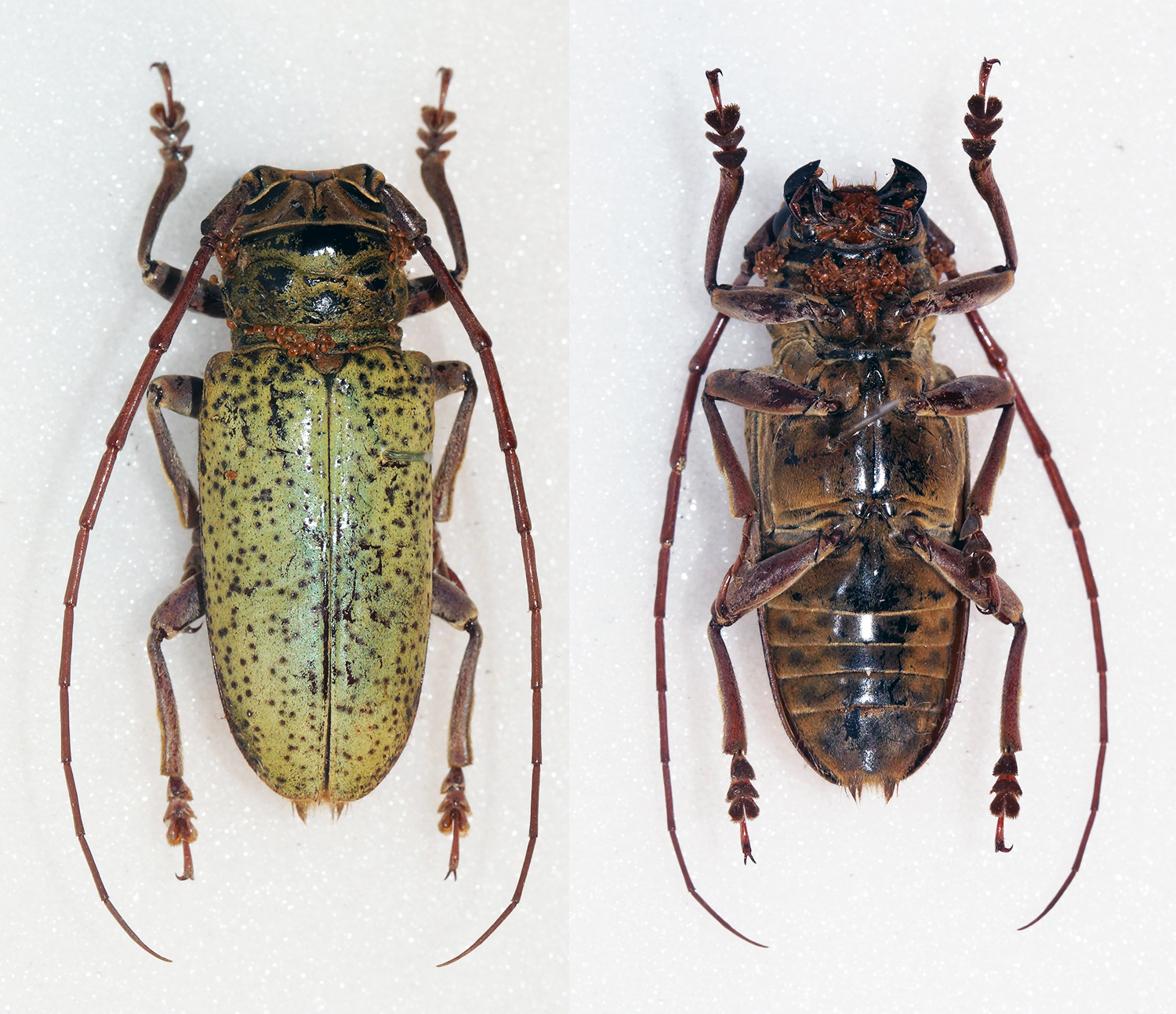

Scientific classification
- Kingdom: Animalia
- Phylum: Arthropoda
- Class: Insecta
- Order: Coleoptera
- Suborder: Polyphaga
- Infraorder: Cucujiformia
- Family: Cerambycidae
- Genus: Prosopocera
- Species: P. bicolor

Binomial name
- Prosopocera bicolor Westwood, 1845

Synonyms
- Lamia (Sternotomis?) bicolor Westwood, 1845

= Prosopocera bicolor =

Species of beetle

Prosopocera bicolor is a species of beetle in the family Cerambycidae. It was described by John O. Westwood in 1845, originally under the genus Lamia. It is known from Ghana and Cameroon.
