= Prosopocera gassneri =

Scientific classification
- Kingdom: Animalia
- Phylum: Arthropoda
- Class: Insecta
- Order: Coleoptera
- Suborder: Polyphaga
- Infraorder: Cucujiformia
- Family: Cerambycidae
- Genus: Prosopocera
- Species: P. gassneri

Binomial name
- Prosopocera gassneri Breuning, 1936

Species of beetle

Prosopocera gassneri is a species of beetle in the family Cerambycidae. It was described by Stephan von Breuning in 1936. It is known from the Democratic Republic of the Congo, Gabon, and Cameroon.
