= Bangalaia margaretae =

Scientific classification
- Kingdom: Animalia
- Phylum: Arthropoda
- Class: Insecta
- Order: Coleoptera
- Suborder: Polyphaga
- Infraorder: Cucujiformia
- Family: Cerambycidae
- Genus: Bangalaia
- Species: B. margaretae

Binomial name
- Bangalaia margaretae Gilmour, 1956

Species of beetle

Bangalaia margaretae is a species of beetle in the family Cerambycidae. It was described by E. Forrest Gilmour in 1956. It is known from Mozambique.
