= Bangalaia chaerila =

Scientific classification
- Kingdom: Animalia
- Phylum: Arthropoda
- Class: Insecta
- Order: Coleoptera
- Suborder: Polyphaga
- Infraorder: Cucujiformia
- Family: Cerambycidae
- Genus: Bangalaia
- Species: B. chaerila

Binomial name
- Bangalaia chaerila Jordan, 1903

Synonyms
- Bangalaia chaerila distinctemaculata Lepesme & Breuning, 1956; Bangalaia chaerila imitans (Aurivillius, 1916); Bangalaia viridis imitans (Aurivillius, 1916); Sternotomiella chaerila (Jordan, 1903); Sternotomiella imitans Aurivillius, 1916

Species of beetle

Bangalaia chaerila is a species of beetle in the family Cerambycidae. It was described by Karl Jordan in 1903. It is known from Cameroon, Angola, Gabon, and the Democratic Republic of the Congo. It contains the variety Bangalaia chaerila var. viridis.
