= Prosopocera princeps =

Scientific classification
- Domain: Eukaryota
- Kingdom: Animalia
- Phylum: Arthropoda
- Class: Insecta
- Order: Coleoptera
- Suborder: Polyphaga
- Infraorder: Cucujiformia
- Family: Cerambycidae
- Genus: Prosopocera
- Species: P. princeps

Binomial name
- Prosopocera princeps (Hope, 1843)

Synonyms
- Lamia (Sternotomis?) princeps Hope, 1843; Lamia princeps Hope, 1843; Parapterochaos princeps (Hope, 1843); Sternotomis princeps (Hope, 1843)

Species of beetle

Prosopocera princeps is a species of beetle in the family Cerambycidae. It was described by Frederick William Hope in 1843, originally under the genus Lamia. It is known from the Ivory Coast, Guinea, Gabon, Senegal, and Sierra Leone. It contains the varietas Prosopocera princeps var. ivorensis.
