= Bangalaia soror =

Scientific classification
- Kingdom: Animalia
- Phylum: Arthropoda
- Class: Insecta
- Order: Coleoptera
- Suborder: Polyphaga
- Infraorder: Cucujiformia
- Family: Cerambycidae
- Genus: Bangalaia
- Species: B. soror

Binomial name
- Bangalaia soror Jordan, 1903

Species of beetle

Bangalaia soror is a species of beetle in the family Cerambycidae. It was described by Karl Jordan in 1903. It is known from the Ivory Coast, Equatorial Guinea, the Democratic Republic of the Congo, and Sierra Leone.
