= Prosopocera angolensis =

Scientific classification
- Domain: Eukaryota
- Kingdom: Animalia
- Phylum: Arthropoda
- Class: Insecta
- Order: Coleoptera
- Suborder: Polyphaga
- Infraorder: Cucujiformia
- Family: Cerambycidae
- Genus: Prosopocera
- Species: P. angolensis

Binomial name
- Prosopocera angolensis Quedenfeldt, 1885

Synonyms
- Prosopocera ertli Aurivillius, 1903; Prosopocera jansseni Hintz, 1909; Prosopocera viridegrisea m. grisescens Breuning, 1936

Species of beetle

Prosopocera angolensis is a species of beetle in the family Cerambycidae. It was described by Quedenfeldt in 1885. It has a wide distribution throughout Africa.
