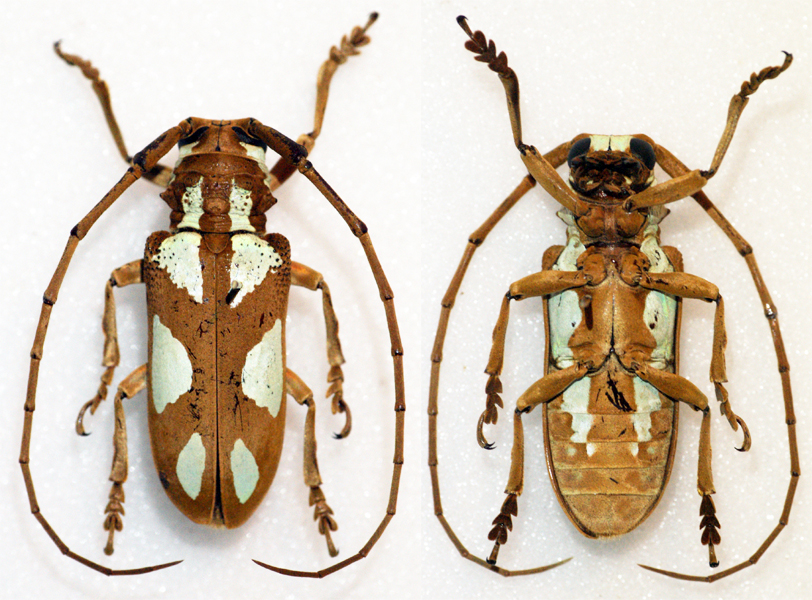
- Prosopocera lactator dorsal and ventral views

Scientific classification
- Kingdom: Animalia
- Phylum: Arthropoda
- Class: Insecta
- Order: Coleoptera
- Suborder: Polyphaga
- Infraorder: Cucujiformia
- Family: Cerambycidae
- Genus: Prosopocera
- Species: P. lactator

Binomial name
- Prosopocera lactator (Fabricius, 1801)

Synonyms
- Anoplostheta lactator (Fabricius) Dejean, 1835; Lamia lactator Fabricius, 1801; Lamia radiata Gory, 1835

= Prosopocera lactator =

Species of beetle

Prosopocera lactator, the Turquoise Longhorn, is a species of flat-faced longhorn beetles in the subfamily Lamiinae.

== Subspecies ==
- Prosopocera lactator lactator (Fabricius, 1801)
- Prosopocera lactator meridionalis Jordan, 1903
- Prosopocera lactator poggei Harold, 1878

== Description ==
Prosopocera lactator can reach a length of about 23–37 millimetres (0.91–1.46 in). The colors and markings of these longhorn beetles are quite variable. Usually they are brown-colored, with large light greenish or whitish patches on the elytra and pronotum and turquoise leg markings. The coloration of said greenish-white patches derives from the orientation of three-dimensional photonic-crystal grains present in the scales. These beetles feed exclusively on Cashew (Anacardium occidentale). Females lay their eggs in the stems and branches of the Buffalo Thorn (Ziziphus mucronata).

== Distribution ==
This species can be found in Democratic Republic of the Congo, Guinea, Malawi, Mozambique, Senegal, Somalia, South Africa, Tanzania and Uganda.
