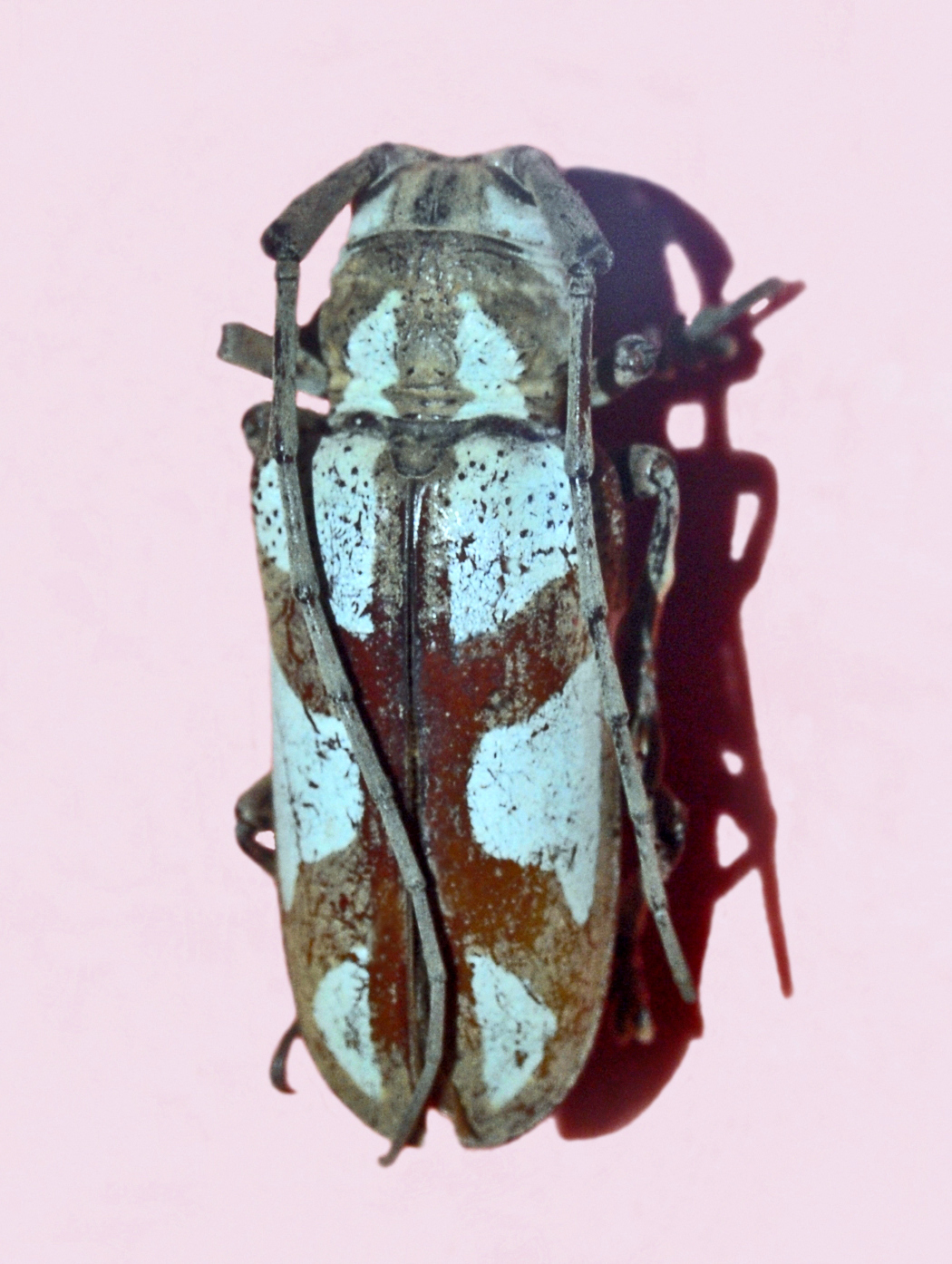
- Museum specimen of Prosopocera lactator

Scientific classification
- Kingdom: Animalia
- Phylum: Arthropoda
- Class: Insecta
- Order: Coleoptera
- Suborder: Polyphaga
- Infraorder: Cucujiformia
- Family: Cerambycidae
- Tribe: Prosopocerini
- Genus: Prosopocera; Dejean, 1835

Synonyms
- Alphitopola Thomson, 1857; Imalmus Pascoe, 1864; Megaloharpya Allard, 1993; Parapterochaos Breuning, 1977; Zalates Thomson, 1860

= Prosopocera =

Genus of beetles

Prosopocera is a genus of flat-faced longhorn beetles in the subfamily Lamiinae.

== Species ==
- Prosopocera alboplagiata Jordan, 1894
- Prosopocera albovestita Breuning, 1936
- Prosopocera angolensis Quedenfeldt, 1885
- Prosopocera antennata Gahan, 1890
- Prosopocera belzebuth Thomson, 1857
- Prosopocera bicolor Westwood, 1845
- Prosopocera bipunctata (Drury, 1773)
- Prosopocera blairi Breuning, 1936
- Prosopocera brunnea Breuning, 1936
- Prosopocera callypiga (Thomson, 1857)
- Prosopocera cylindrica Aurivillius, 1903
- Prosopocera decellei Breuning, 1968
- Prosopocera escalerai Báguena, 1952
- Prosopocera francoisiana Lepesme, 1948
- Prosopocera fryi Murray, 1871
- Prosopocera fuscomaculata Breuning, 1936
- Prosopocera gassneri Breuning, 1936
- Prosopocera gigantea Breuning, 1950
- Prosopocera griseomaculata Breuning, 1936
- Prosopocera humeralis Breuning, 1938
- Prosopocera insignis Jordan, 1903
- Prosopocera lactator (Fabricius, 1801)
- Prosopocera lydiae Bjornstad & Minetti, 2010
- Prosopocera mediomaculata Breuning, 1938
- Prosopocera myops Chevrolat, 1855
- Prosopocera parinsignis Breuning, 1970
- Prosopocera prasina Breuning, 1936
- Prosopocera princeps (Hope, 1843)
- Prosopocera pseudotchadensis Breuning, 1981
- Prosopocera regia Breuning, 1936
- Prosopocera schoutedeni Breuning, 1936
- Prosopocera signatifrons Duvivier, 1891
- Prosopocera spinipennis Breuning, 1954
- Prosopocera subvalida Breuning, 1954
- Prosopocera superbrunnea Breuning, 1969
- Prosopocera undulata Schwarzer, 1929
- Prosopocera usambarica Breuning, 1954
- Prosopocera valida Aurivillius, 1927
- Prosopocera viridegrisea Hintz, 1911
