= Paraprotomocerus =

Scientific classification
- Kingdom: Animalia
- Phylum: Arthropoda
- Class: Insecta
- Order: Coleoptera
- Suborder: Polyphaga
- Infraorder: Cucujiformia
- Family: Cerambycidae
- Genus: Paraprotomocerus
- Species: P. allardi

Binomial name
- Paraprotomocerus allardi Breuning, 1966

Genus of beetles

Paraprotomocerus allardi is a species of beetle in the family Cerambycidae, and the only species in the genus Paraprotomocerus. It was described by Stephan von Breuning in 1966.
