= Parabangalaia =

Scientific classification
- Kingdom: Animalia
- Phylum: Arthropoda
- Class: Insecta
- Order: Coleoptera
- Suborder: Polyphaga
- Infraorder: Cucujiformia
- Family: Cerambycidae
- Genus: Parabangalaia
- Species: P. flavosignata

Binomial name
- Parabangalaia flavosignata Breuning, 1946

Genus of beetles

Parabangalaia flavosignata is a species of beetle in the family Cerambycidae, and the only species in the genus Parabangalaia. It was described by Stephan von Breuning in 1946.
