= Bangaloides =

Scientific classification
- Kingdom: Animalia
- Phylum: Arthropoda
- Class: Insecta
- Order: Coleoptera
- Suborder: Polyphaga
- Infraorder: Cucujiformia
- Family: Cerambycidae
- Genus: Bangaloides
- Species: B. strandi

Binomial name
- Bangaloides strandi (Breuning, 1936)

Genus of beetles

Bangaloides strandi is a species of beetle in the family Cerambycidae, and the only species in the genus Bangaloides. It was described by Stephan von Breuning in 1936.
