= Freadelpha murrayi =

Scientific classification
- Domain: Eukaryota
- Kingdom: Animalia
- Phylum: Arthropoda
- Class: Insecta
- Order: Coleoptera
- Suborder: Polyphaga
- Infraorder: Cucujiformia
- Family: Cerambycidae
- Genus: Freadelpha
- Species: F. murrayi

Binomial name
- Freadelpha murrayi (Chevrolat, 1855)

Synonyms
- Geloharpya murrayi (Chevrolat, 1855); Sternotomis murrayi Chevrolat, 1855

Species of beetle

Freadelpha murrayi is a species of beetle in the family Cerambycidae. It was described by Louis Alexandre Auguste Chevrolat in 1855. It is known from Gabon, Cameroon, and Nigeria.
