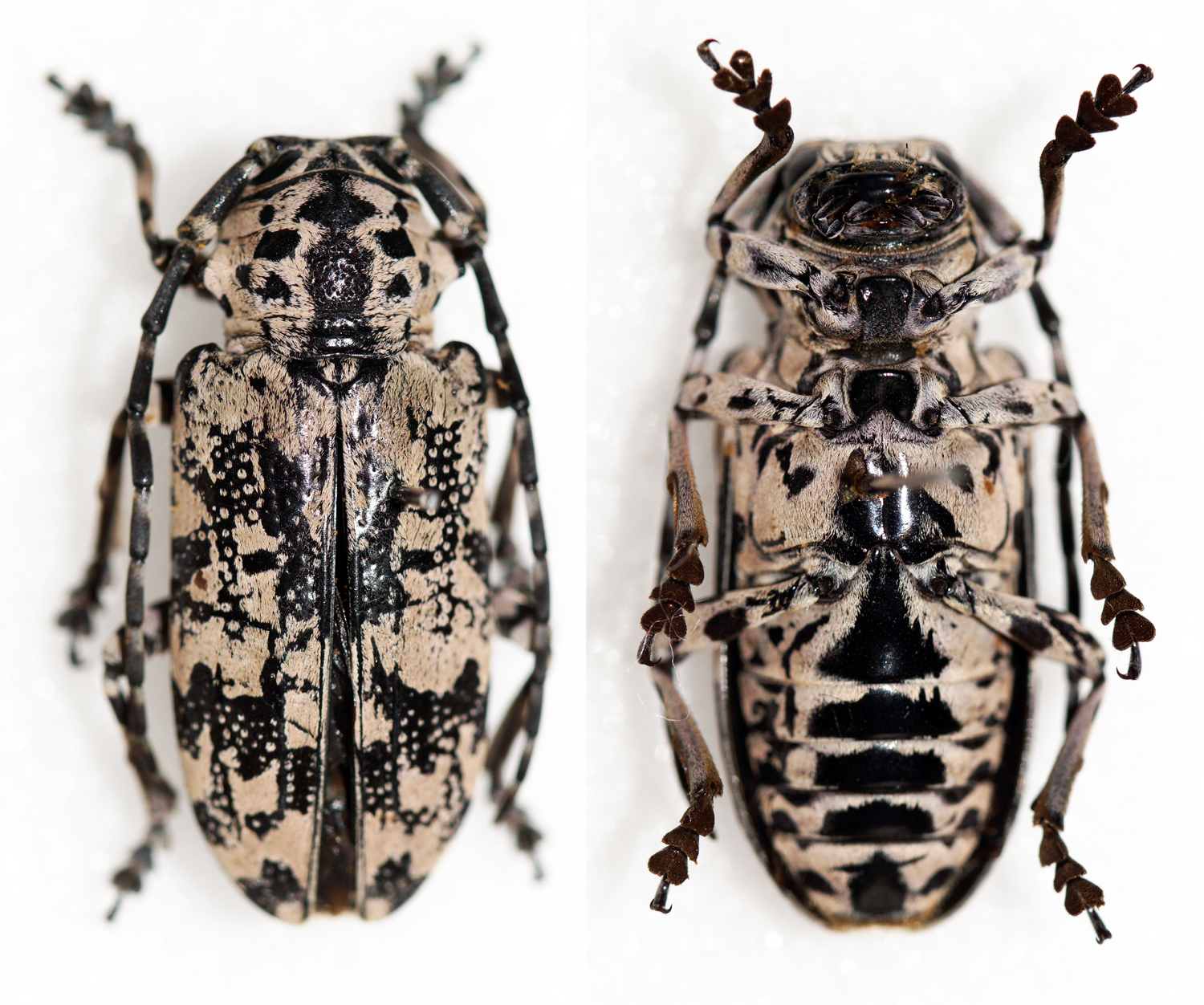

Scientific classification
- Domain: Eukaryota
- Kingdom: Animalia
- Phylum: Arthropoda
- Class: Insecta
- Order: Coleoptera
- Suborder: Polyphaga
- Infraorder: Cucujiformia
- Family: Cerambycidae
- Genus: Freadelpha
- Species: F. eremita

Binomial name
- Freadelpha eremita (Westwood, 1845)

Synonyms
- Freadelpha humeralis Thomson, 1858; Lamia (Sternotomis) eremita Westwood, 1845; Sternotomis eremita (Westwood, 1845)

= Freadelpha eremita =

Species of beetle

Freadelpha eremita is a species of beetle in the family Cerambycidae. It was described by John O. Westwood in 1845, originally under the genus Lamia. It has a wide distribution in Africa.

== Subspecies ==
- Freadelpha eremita eremita (Westwood, 1845)
- Freadelpha eremita gabonensis Breuning, 1954
