= Freadelpha exigua =

Scientific classification
- Domain: Eukaryota
- Kingdom: Animalia
- Phylum: Arthropoda
- Class: Insecta
- Order: Coleoptera
- Suborder: Polyphaga
- Infraorder: Cucujiformia
- Family: Cerambycidae
- Genus: Freadelpha
- Species: F. exigua

Binomial name
- Freadelpha exigua Kolbe, 1896

Species of beetle

Freadelpha exigua is a species of beetle in the family Cerambycidae. It was described by Kolbe in 1896.
