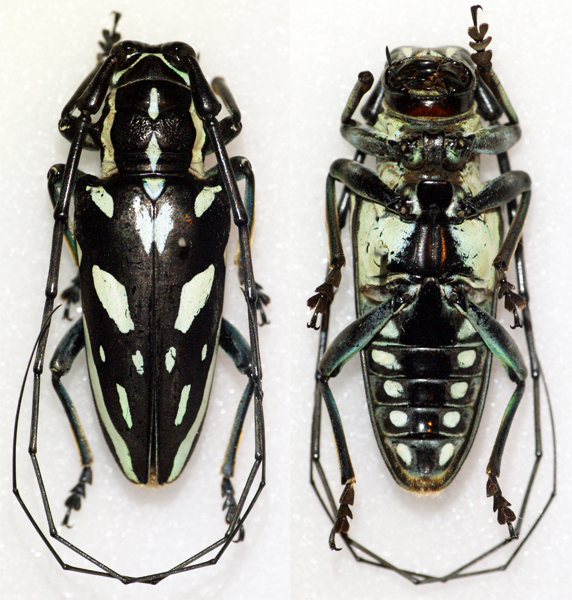

Scientific classification
- Kingdom: Animalia
- Phylum: Arthropoda
- Clade: Pancrustacea
- Class: Insecta
- Order: Coleoptera
- Suborder: Polyphaga
- Infraorder: Cucujiformia
- Family: Cerambycidae
- Genus: Freadelpha
- Species: F. amoena

Binomial name
- Freadelpha amoena (Westwood, 1841)

Synonyms
- Lamia (Sternotomis) amoena Westwood, 1841 nec Daman, 1817

= Freadelpha amoena =

Species of beetle

Freadelpha amoena is a species of beetle in the family Cerambycidae. It was described by John O. Westwood in 1841. It is known from the Republic of the Congo, the Democratic Republic of the Congo, and Ghana.
