= Freadelpha leucospila =

Scientific classification
- Domain: Eukaryota
- Kingdom: Animalia
- Phylum: Arthropoda
- Class: Insecta
- Order: Coleoptera
- Suborder: Polyphaga
- Infraorder: Cucujiformia
- Family: Cerambycidae
- Genus: Freadelpha
- Species: F. leucospila

Binomial name
- Freadelpha leucospila (Jordan, 1903)

Synonyms
- Sternotomis leucospila Jordan, 1903

Species of beetle

Freadelpha leucospila is a species of beetle in the family Cerambycidae. It was described by Karl Jordan, in 1903. It is found in the Republic of the Congo, the Democratic Republic of the Congo, and Equatorial Guinea.
