= Freadelpha principalis =

Scientific classification
- Domain: Eukaryota
- Kingdom: Animalia
- Phylum: Arthropoda
- Class: Insecta
- Order: Coleoptera
- Suborder: Polyphaga
- Infraorder: Cucujiformia
- Family: Cerambycidae
- Genus: Freadelpha
- Species: F. principalis

Binomial name
- Freadelpha principalis (Dalman, 1817)

Synonyms
- Lamia (Sternotomis) palinii Hope, 1843; Lamia principalis Dalman, 1817

Species of beetle

Freadelpha principalis is a species of beetle in the family Cerambycidae. It was described by Dalman in 1817, originally under the genus Lamia. It has a wide distribution in Africa.

== Varieties ==
- Freadelpha principalis var. hilaris (Jordan, 1909)
- Freadelpha principalis var. picta (Waterhouse, 1886)
