= Freadelpha crux-nigra =

Scientific classification
- Domain: Eukaryota
- Kingdom: Animalia
- Phylum: Arthropoda
- Class: Insecta
- Order: Coleoptera
- Suborder: Polyphaga
- Infraorder: Cucujiformia
- Family: Cerambycidae
- Genus: Freadelpha
- Species: F. crux-nigra

Binomial name
- Freadelpha crux-nigra (Hope, 1833)

Species of beetle

Freadelpha crux-nigra is a species of beetle in the family Cerambycidae. It was described by Frederick William Hope in 1833.
