= Freadelpha burgeoni =

Scientific classification
- Kingdom: Animalia
- Phylum: Arthropoda
- Class: Insecta
- Order: Coleoptera
- Suborder: Polyphaga
- Infraorder: Cucujiformia
- Family: Cerambycidae
- Genus: Freadelpha
- Species: F. burgeoni

Binomial name
- Freadelpha burgeoni Breuning, 1935

Species of beetle

Freadelpha burgeoni is a species of beetle in the family Cerambycidae. It was described by Stephan von Breuning in 1935.
