= Freadelpha vittata =

Scientific classification
- Domain: Eukaryota
- Kingdom: Animalia
- Phylum: Arthropoda
- Class: Insecta
- Order: Coleoptera
- Suborder: Polyphaga
- Infraorder: Cucujiformia
- Family: Cerambycidae
- Genus: Freadelpha
- Species: F. vittata

Binomial name
- Freadelpha vittata (Aurivillius, 1907)

Synonyms
- Geloharpya vittata Aurivillius, 1907

Species of beetle

Freadelpha vittata is a species of beetle in the family Cerambycidae. It was described by Per Olof Christopher Aurivillius in 1907. It is known from the Republic of the Congo and the Democratic Republic of the Congo.
