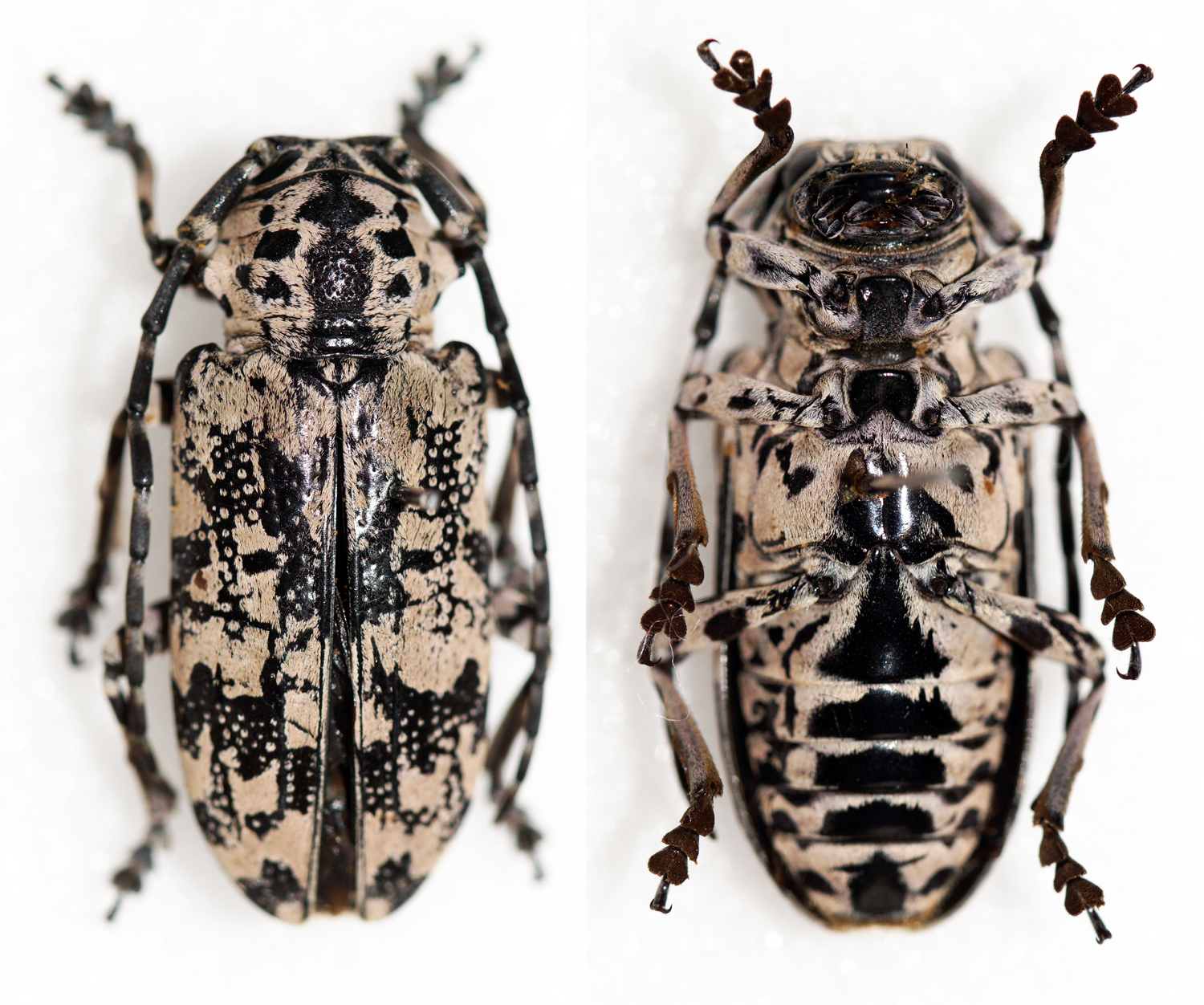
- Freadelpha eremita

Scientific classification
- Domain: Eukaryota
- Kingdom: Animalia
- Phylum: Arthropoda
- Class: Insecta
- Order: Coleoptera
- Suborder: Polyphaga
- Infraorder: Cucujiformia
- Family: Cerambycidae
- Tribe: Sternotomini
- Genus: Freadelpha

= Freadelpha =

Genus of beetles

Freadelpha is a genus of longhorn beetles of the subfamily Lamiinae, containing the following species:

subgenus Freadelpha

- Freadelpha chloroleuca Harold, 1879
- Freadelpha cinerea (Thomson, 1878)
- Freadelpha coronata (Jordan, 1896)
- Freadelpha eremita (Westwood, 1845)
- Freadelpha exigua Kolbe, 1896
- Freadelpha holoviridis Breuning, 1977
- Freadelpha principalis (Dalman, 1817)
- Freadelpha rex (Jordan, 1903)

subgenus Geloharpya

- Freadelpha amoena (Westwood, 1841)
- Freadelpha burgeoni Breuning, 1935
- Freadelpha confluens (Harold, 1879)
- Freadelpha crux-nigra (Hope, 1833)
- Freadelpha leucospila (Jordan, 1903)
- Freadelpha murrayi (Chevrolat, 1855)
- Freadelpha polyspila (Harold, 1879)
- Freadelpha vittata (Aurivillius, 1907)
