= Freadelpha confluens =

Scientific classification
- Domain: Eukaryota
- Kingdom: Animalia
- Phylum: Arthropoda
- Class: Insecta
- Order: Coleoptera
- Suborder: Polyphaga
- Infraorder: Cucujiformia
- Family: Cerambycidae
- Genus: Freadelpha
- Species: F. confluens

Binomial name
- Freadelpha confluens (Harold, 1879)

Synonyms
- Sternotomis confluens Harold, 1879

Species of beetle

Freadelpha confluens is a species of beetle in the family Cerambycidae. It was described by Harold in 1879. It is known from Tanzania, the Democratic Republic of the Congo, Angola, and Zambia.

== Subspecies ==
- Freadelpha confluens confluens Harold, 1879
- Freadelpha confluens tanganjicae Breuning, 1978
