= Freadelpha chloroleuca =

Scientific classification
- Domain: Eukaryota
- Kingdom: Animalia
- Phylum: Arthropoda
- Class: Insecta
- Order: Coleoptera
- Suborder: Polyphaga
- Infraorder: Cucujiformia
- Family: Cerambycidae
- Genus: Freadelpha
- Species: F. chloroleuca

Binomial name
- Freadelpha chloroleuca Harold, 1879

Synonyms
- Freadelpha chloroleuca m. quadriocellata Teocchi, Jiroux & Sudre, 2004

Species of beetle

Freadelpha chloroleuca is a species of beetle in the family Cerambycidae. It was described by Harold in 1879.
