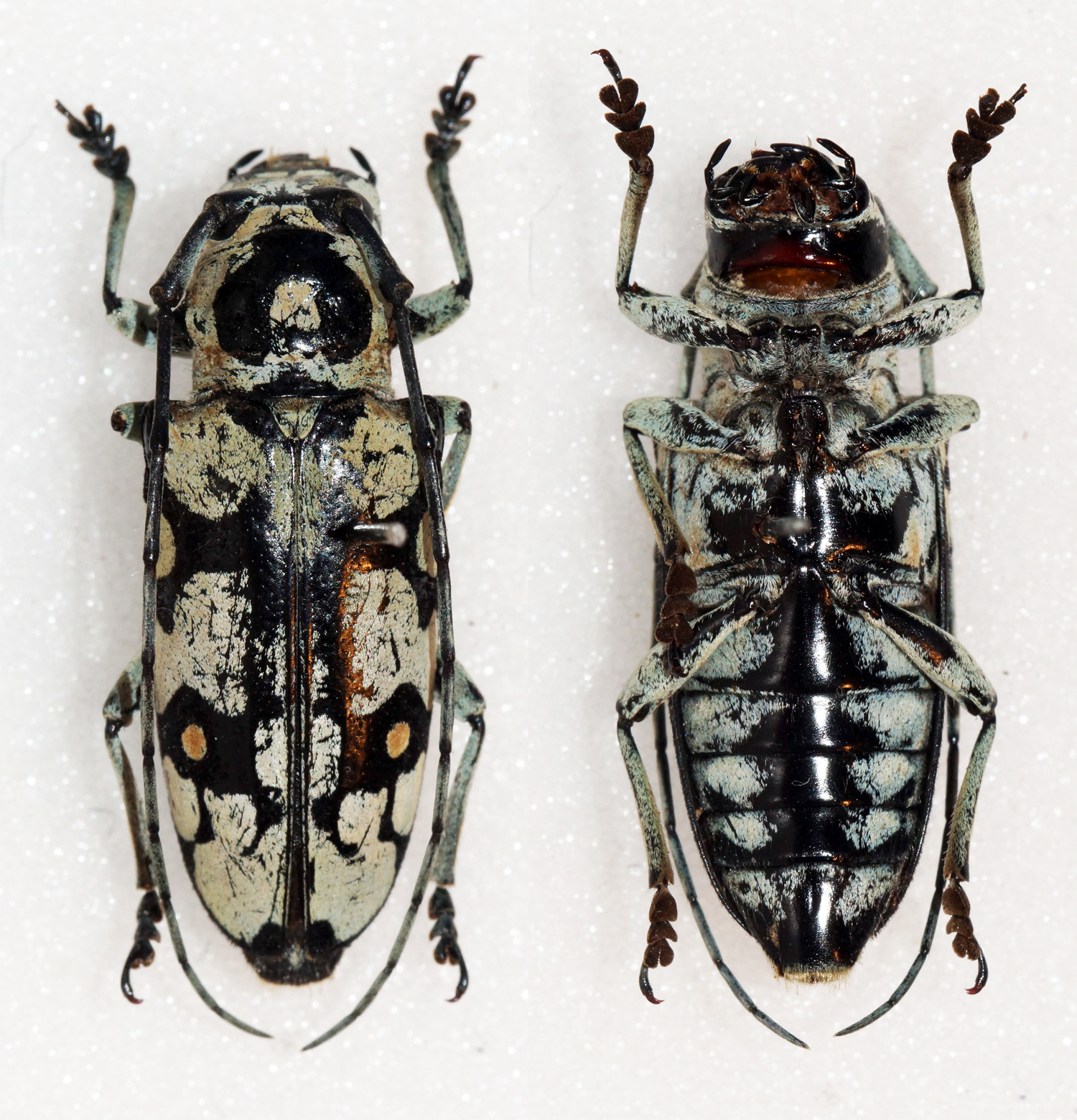

Scientific classification
- Domain: Eukaryota
- Kingdom: Animalia
- Phylum: Arthropoda
- Class: Insecta
- Order: Coleoptera
- Suborder: Polyphaga
- Infraorder: Cucujiformia
- Family: Cerambycidae
- Genus: Freadelpha
- Species: F. polyspila

Binomial name
- Freadelpha polyspila (Harold, 1879)

Synonyms
- Geloharpya polyspila polyspila (Harold, 1879); Sternotomis polyspila Harold, 1879

= Freadelpha polyspila =

Species of beetle

Freadelpha polyspila is a species of beetle in the family Cerambycidae. It was described by Harold in 1879. It is known from the Democratic Republic of the Congo, Tanzania, Angola, Zambia, and Malawi.

== Varietas ==
- Freadelpha polyspila var. grandis (Jordan, 1903)
- Freadelpha polyspila var. imitatrix Breuning, 1935
- Freadelpha polyspila var. insignis Breuning, 1935
- Freadelpha polyspila var. unicolor Breuning, 1935
