= Freadelpha cinerea =

Scientific classification
- Domain: Eukaryota
- Kingdom: Animalia
- Phylum: Arthropoda
- Class: Insecta
- Order: Coleoptera
- Suborder: Polyphaga
- Infraorder: Cucujiformia
- Family: Cerambycidae
- Genus: Freadelpha
- Species: F. cinerea

Binomial name
- Freadelpha cinerea (Thomson, 1878)

Species of beetle

Freadelpha cinerea is a species of beetle in the family Cerambycidae. It was described by James Thomson in 1878.

== Subspecies ==
- Freadelpha cinerea cinerea (Thomson, 1878)
- Freadelpha cinerea junodi Jordan, 1906
