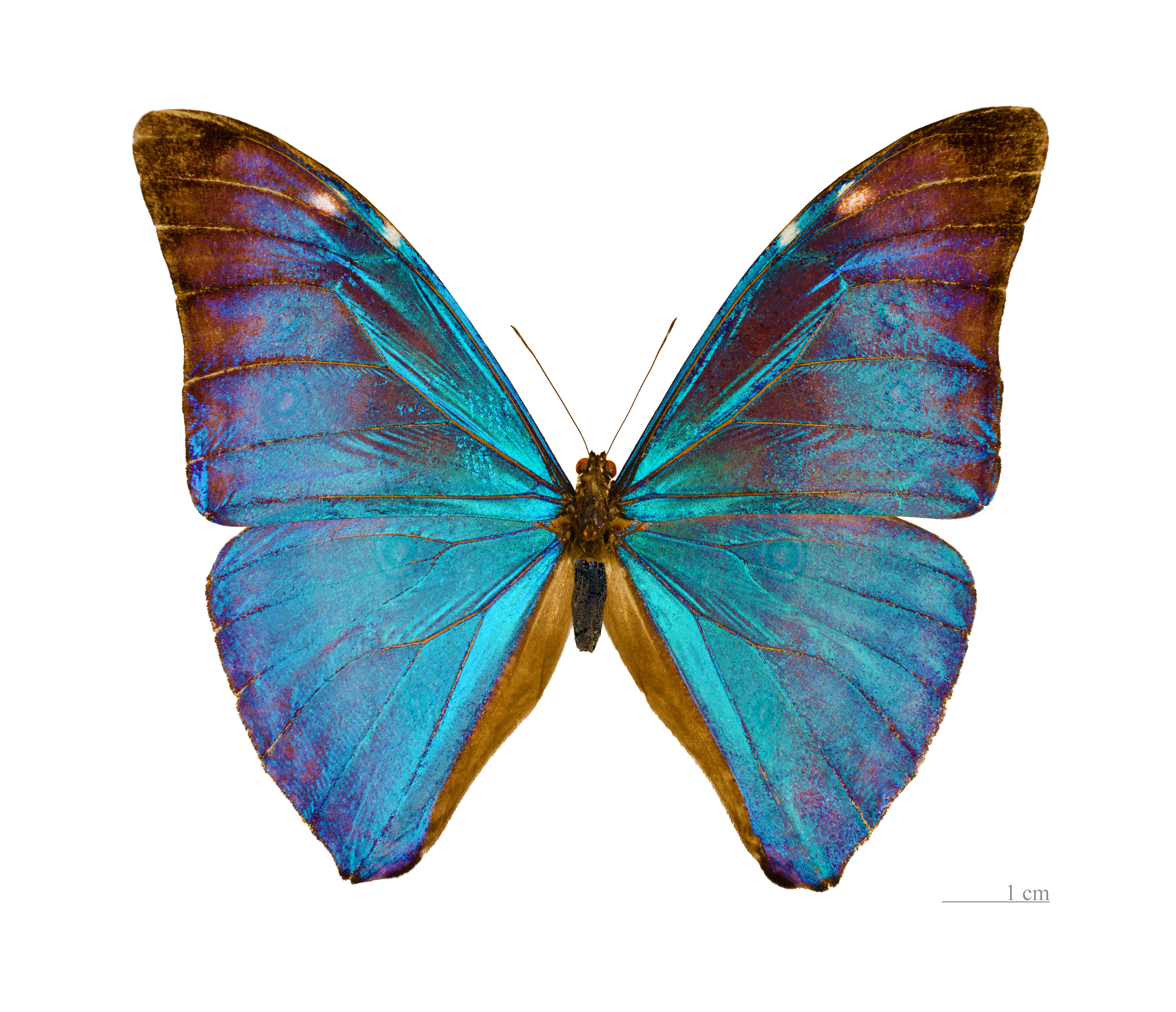
- Morpho marcus marcus, dorsal, MHNT
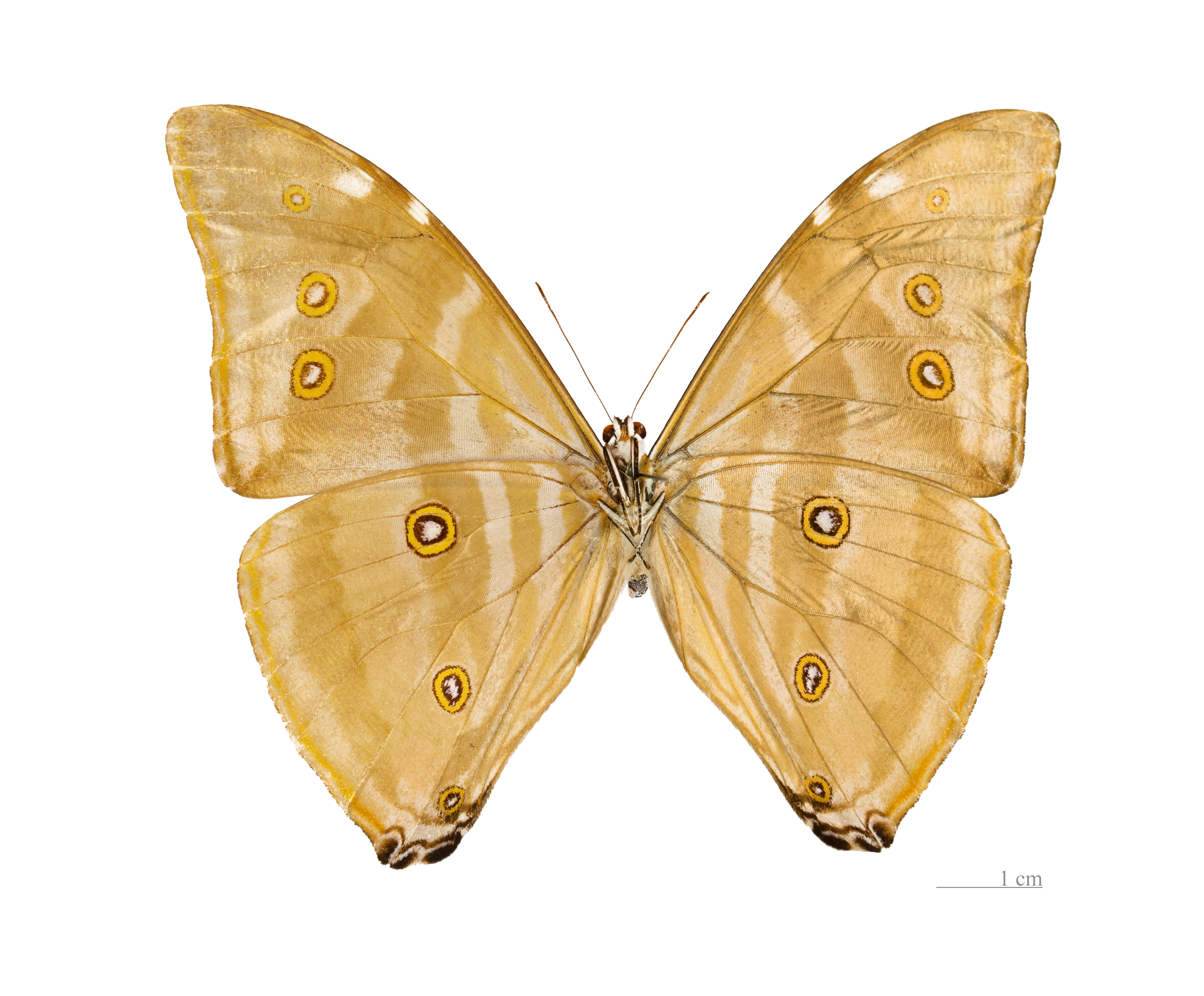
- Morpho marcus marcus, ventral, MHNT

Scientific classification
- Domain: Eukaryota
- Kingdom: Animalia
- Phylum: Arthropoda
- Class: Insecta
- Order: Lepidoptera
- Family: Nymphalidae
- Genus: Morpho
- Species: M. adonis

Binomial name
- Morpho adonis (Cramer, 1775)

Synonyms
- Papilio marcus Schaller, 1785; Papilio adonis Cramer, 1775 (preocc. Denis & Schiffermüller, 1775); Morpho adonis (Cramer, 1775)

= Morpho adonis =

Adonis morpho

Species of butterfly

Morpho adonis, the Adonis morpho, is a Neotropical butterfly. It is found in Venezuela, Suriname, French Guiana, Colombia, Ecuador, Brazil, and Peru. The wingspan ranges from 70 to 90 millimetres (2.8 to 3.5 in).

Morpho adonis is a species group which includes several species.

- Morpho adonis (Guianas, Cayenne)
- Morpho eugenia (Guyana)
- Morpho uraneis (Brazil)
- Morpho marcus probably conspecific with adonis and the correct name.

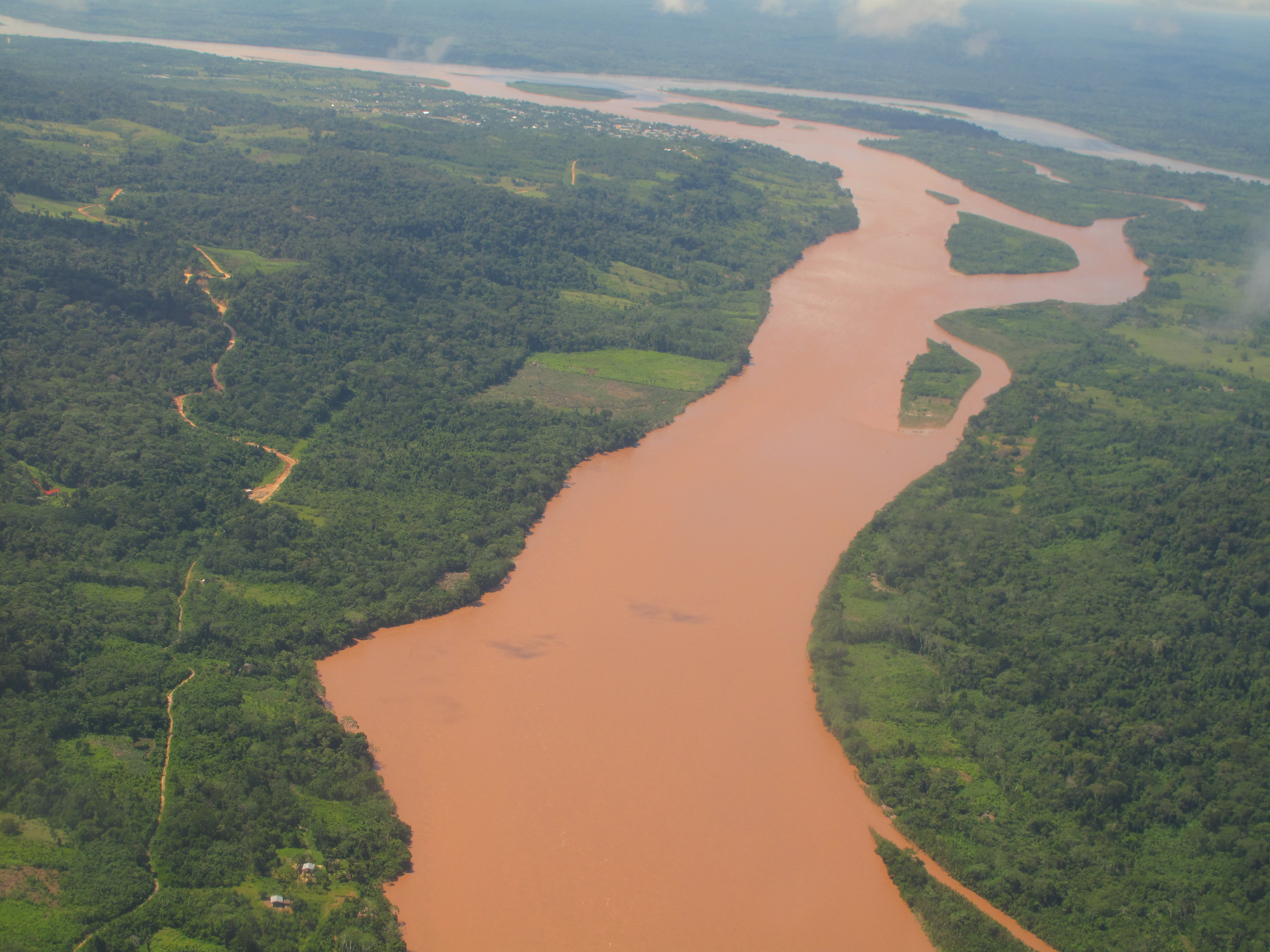
Ucayali River habitat in Peru

== Habitat ==
Morpho adonis is found in mid-elevation rain forest at altitudes between about 300–1000 meters above sea level.

== Behaviour ==
In 1913, Hans Fruhstorfer wrote: "Dr. Hahnel reports its capture at Iquitos and Pebas. There it flies quickly and impetuously (sometimes at an elevation of 12 ft.), dashing out from among the branches, crossing the road and following clearings among the trees, in which they sail along just over the tops or in and out among the branches."

== Etymology ==
The butterfly is named for the mythological Adonis, the Greek god of beauty and desire.
