= Morpho athena =

Scientific classification
- Domain: Eukaryota
- Kingdom: Animalia
- Phylum: Arthropoda
- Class: Insecta
- Order: Lepidoptera
- Family: Nymphalidae
- Genus: Morpho
- Species: M. athena

Binomial name
- Morpho athena Otero, 1966

Species of butterfly

Morpho athena is a Neotropical butterfly.

== Description ==
Morpho athena is a large white butterfly, very similar to Morpho luna and related species, with a brown narrow band along two-thirds of the costal edge of the forewing. This ends in a hook-shaped mark.

== Distribution ==
This species is present in Brazil.
