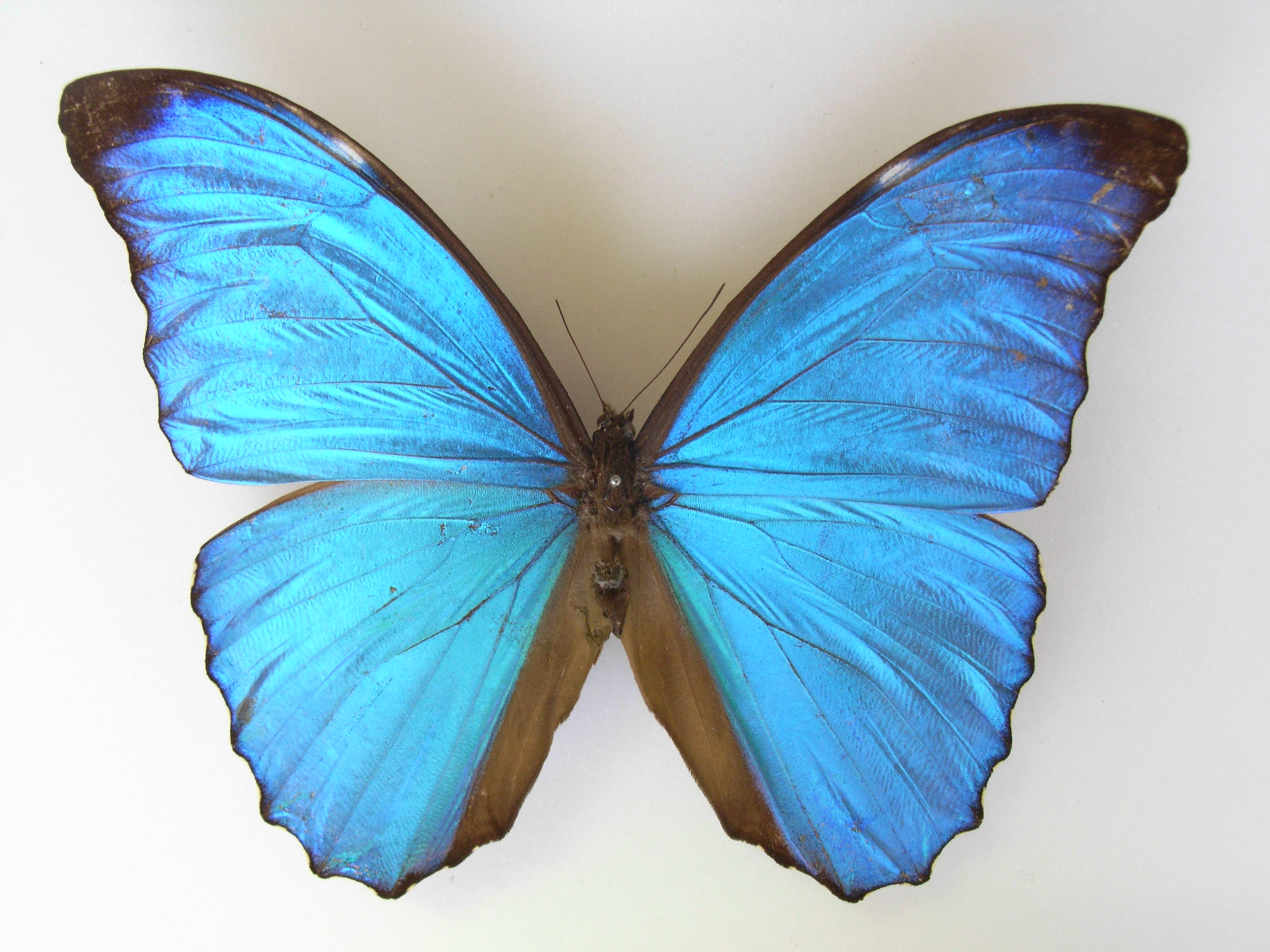
- Male
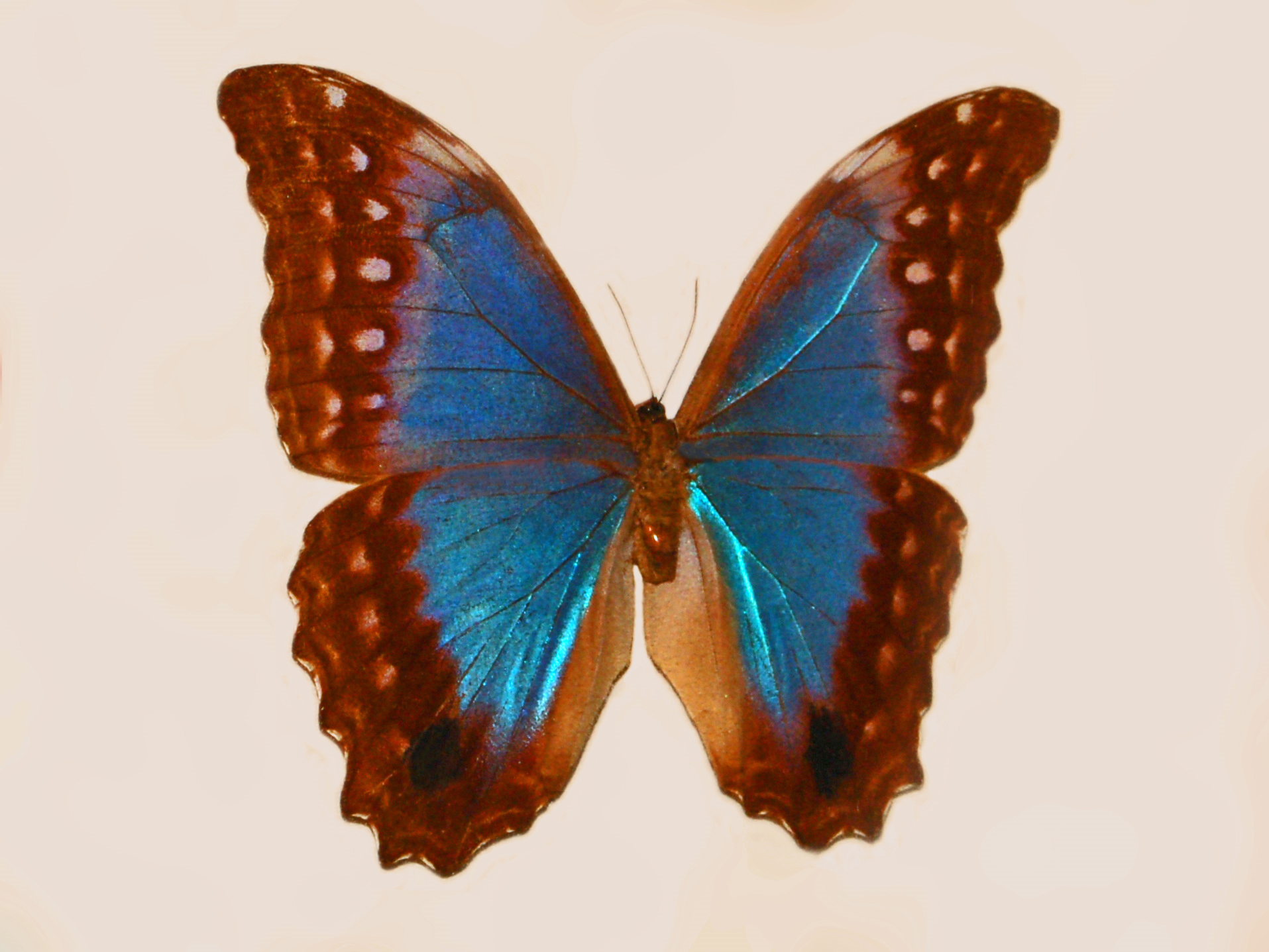
- Female from Colombia

Scientific classification
- Kingdom: Animalia
- Phylum: Arthropoda
- Class: Insecta
- Order: Lepidoptera
- Family: Nymphalidae
- Genus: Morpho
- Species: M. amathonte

Binomial name
- Morpho amathonte (Deyrolle, 1860)

Synonyms
- Morpho menelaus ssp. amathonte

= Morpho amathonte =

Species of butterfly

Morpho amathonte is a Neotropical butterfly belonging to the subfamily Morphinae of the family Nymphalidae. It is considered, by some authors, to be a subspecies of Morpho menelaus.

The genus Morpho is palatable but some species (such as M. amathonte) are strong fliers; birds – even species which are specialized for catching butterflies on the wing – find it hard to catch them. The conspicuous blue coloration shared by most Morpho species may be a case of Müllerian mimicry, or may be 'pursuit aposematism'.

== Description ==
Morpho amathonte has a wingspan of about 100–150 millimetres (3.9–5.9 in). The total number of days for which it takes this species to grow into an adult is about 120 days. During this time, the butterfly is an egg for 14 days, then remains as larvae for 83 days, and then remains a pupa for about 19 days. The females prefer to breed on isolated trees in intact forests, despite the fact that the hostplant is a familiar and plentiful tree in secondary woods. This species shows an evident sexual dimorphism which differentiates males from females. The basic color in males is bright metallic blue, sometimes bluish. In the females the upper surfaces of the wings are partially blue and have a wide dark gray-brown margins, decorated with small white spots running along the outer edge of both wings. From closely related species Morpho amathonte is distinguished by a large dark spot at the top of the front wings. The undersides of the wings are brown, becoming lighter towards the edges, with three or four colorful and bright eyespots clearly visible on each wing.
Different from those from northwestern Ecuador, which is mainly known as Morpho amathonte ecuadorensis, the Morpho amathonte canyarensis in western Ecuador has their wings’ colour lighter in brown, thus this determines that this is a character which varies among, rather than within, subspecies.

== Distribution ==
This species can be found in Panama, Costa Rica, Venezuela, Colombia and Ecuador. Specifically in Costa Rica, M. amathonte has its hostplants are Dichapetalum grayumii (family: Dichapetalaceae), Dioclea malacocarpa, Leucopogon oliganthus, Lonchocarpus macrophylus, Machaerium seemannii (family: Fabaceae), P. hayesii, Pterocarpus rohrii, Prestoea decurrens (family: Arecaceae) and Pterocarpus officionalis (family: Fabaceae).
