= Morpho niepelti =

Scientific classification
- Domain: Eukaryota
- Kingdom: Animalia
- Phylum: Arthropoda
- Class: Insecta
- Order: Lepidoptera
- Family: Nymphalidae
- Genus: Morpho
- Species: M. niepelti

Binomial name
- Morpho niepelti Röber, 1927

Synonyms
- Morpho theseus staudingeri Niepelt, 1927

Species of butterfly

Morpho niepelti is a Neotropical butterfly.

== Description ==
Morpho niepelti is a large butterfly. The forewings have a concave outer edge and the outer edge of the hindwing is very scalloped. The upperside is more or less dark blue with a very dark marginal band and a very dark strip that runs along two-thirds of the costal edge of the forewing. The underside is brown with a line of ocelli.

== Distribution ==
Morpho niepelti is an endemic species found only in Colombia.

== Taxonomy ==
Morpho niepelti was described by Julius Röber in 1927 under the initial name Morpho theseus staudingeri.

== Etymology ==
The name honours Friedrich Wilhelm Niepelt.
