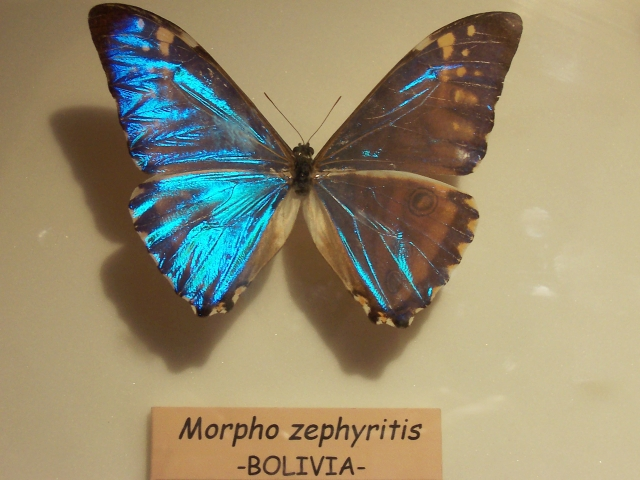

Scientific classification
- Domain: Eukaryota
- Kingdom: Animalia
- Phylum: Arthropoda
- Class: Insecta
- Order: Lepidoptera
- Family: Nymphalidae
- Genus: Morpho
- Species: M. zephyritis

Binomial name
- Morpho zephyritis Butler, 1873

= Morpho zephyritis =

Species of butterfly

Morpho zephyritis, the Zephyritis morpho, is a Neotropical butterfly found in Bolivia and Peru.
