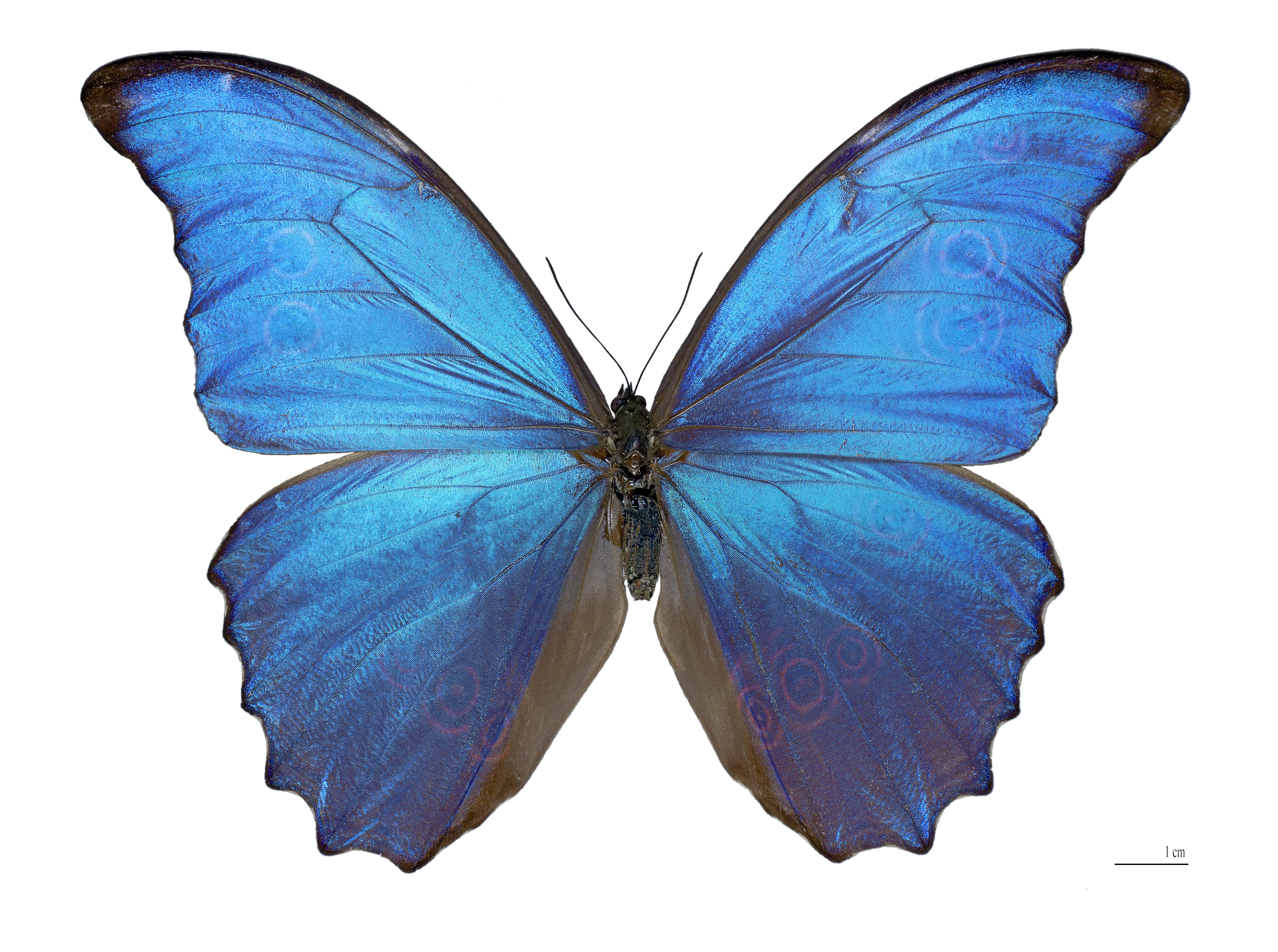
- Morpho didius, museum specimen

Scientific classification
- Kingdom: Animalia
- Phylum: Arthropoda
- Clade: Pancrustacea
- Class: Insecta
- Order: Lepidoptera
- Family: Nymphalidae
- Tribe: Morphini
- Genus: Morpho; Fabricius, 1807

Type species
- Morpho achilles Linnaeus, 1758

Diversity
- c. 29 species and 150 subspecies

Synonyms
- Balachowskyna (Le Moult & Réal, 1962); Brassolis (Illiger, 1807); Cypritis (Le Moult & Réal, 1962); Cytheritis (Le Moult & Réal, 1962); Grasseia (Le Moult & Réal, 1962); Heliornis (Billberg, 1820); Iphimedeia (Fruhstorfer, 1913); Iphixibia (Le Moult & Réal, 1962); Leonte (Hübner, 1819); Megamede (Hübner, 1819); Pessonia (Le Moult & Réal, 1962); Potamis (Hübner, 1807); Schwartzia (Blandin, 1988); Zeuxidion (Le Moult & Réal, 1962)

= Morpho (genus) =

Morpho butterfly

Genus of brush-footed butterflies

The morpho butterflies comprise many species of Neotropical butterfly under the genus Morpho. This genus includes more than 29 accepted species and 147 accepted subspecies, found mostly in South America, Mexico, and Central America. Morpho wingspans range from 7.5 cm (3.0 in) for M. rhodopteron to 20 cm (7.9 in) for M. hecuba, the imposing sunset morpho. The name morpho, meaning "changed" or "modified", is also an epithet. Blue morphos are severely threatened by the deforestation of tropical forests and habitat fragmentation. Humans provide a direct threat to this genus because their beauty attracts artists and collectors from all over the globe who wish to capture and display them. Aside from humans, birds like the jacamar and flycatcher are the adult butterfly’s natural predators.

== Taxonomy and nomenclature ==
Many names attach to the genus Morpho. The genus has also been divided into subgenera. Hundreds of form, variety, and aberration names are used among Morpho species and subspecies. One lepidopterist includes all such species within a single genus, and synonymized many names in a limited number of species. Two other lepidopterists use a phylogenetic analysis with different nomenclature. Other authorities accept many more species.

=== Etymology ===
The genus name Morpho comes from an Ancient Greek epithet μορφώ, roughly "the shapely one", for Aphrodite, goddess of love and beauty.

=== Species ===
This list is arranged alphabetically within species groups.

Subgenus Iphimedeia

- Species group hercules
  - Morpho amphitryon Staudinger, 1887
  - Morpho hercules (Dalman, 1823) – Hercules morpho
  - Morpho richardus Fruhstorfer, 1898 – Richard's morpho
- Species group hecuba
  - Morpho cisseis C. Felder & R. Felder, 1860 – Cisseis morpho
  - Morpho hecuba (Linnaeus, 1771) – sunset morpho
- Species group telemachus
  - Morpho telemachus (Linnaeus, 1758)
  - Morpho theseus Deyrolle, 1860 – Theseus morpho

Subgenus Iphixibia

- Morpho anaxibia (Esper, 1801)

Subgenus Cytheritis

- Species group sulkowskyi
  - Morpho sulkowskyi – Sulkowsky's morpho
- Species group lympharis
  - Morpho lympharis Butler, 1873 – Lympharis morpho
- Species group rhodopteron
  - Morpho rhodopteron Godman & Salvin, 1880
- Species group portis
  - Morpho portis (Hübner, [1821])
  - Morpho thamyris C. Felder & R. Felder, 1867 – Thamyris morpho – or as a subspecies of M. portis
- Species group zephyritis
  - Morpho zephyritis Butler, 1873 – Zephyritis morpho
- Species group aega
  - Morpho aega (Hübner, [1822]) – Aega morpho
- Species group adonis
  - Morpho eugenia Deyrolle, 1860 – Empress Eugénie morpho
  - Morpho marcus (Cramer, 1775)
  - Morpho uraneis Bates, 1865

Subgenus Balachowskyna

- Morpho aurora – Aurora morpho

Subgenus Cypritis

- Species group cypris
  - Morpho cypris Westwood, 1851 – Cypris morpho
- Species group rhetenor
  - Morpho helena Staudinger, 1890 – Helena blue morpho
  - Morpho rhetenor (Cramer, [1775]) – Rhetenor blue morpho

Subgenus Pessonia

- Species group polyphemus
  - Morpho luna Butler, 1869 or as subspecies Morpho polyphemus luna
  - Morpho polyphemus Westwood, [1850] – (Polyphemus) white morpho
- Species group catenaria
  - Morpho catenarius Perry, 1811 or as a subspecies of M. epistrophus
  - Morpho epistrophus (Fabricius, 1796) – Epistrophus white morpho
  - Morpho laertes (Drury, 1782) may be a synonym of M. epistrophus

Subgenus Crasseia

- Species group menelaus
  - Morpho amathonte (Deyrolle, 1860) or as a subspecies of M. menelaus
  - Morpho didius Hopffer, 1874 – metallic blue morpho – or as a subspecies of M. menelaus
  - Morpho godarti (Guérin-Méneville, 1844) – Godart's morpho – or as a subspecies of M. menelaus
  - Morpho menelaus (Linnaeus, 1758) – Menelaus blue morpho

Subgenus Morpho

- Species group deidamia
  - Morpho deidamia (Hübner, [1819]) – Deidamia morpho
  - Morpho granadensis Felder and Felder, 1867 – Granada morpho – or as a subspecies of M. deidamia
- Species group helenor
  - Morpho helenor (Cramer, 1776) – Helenor blue morpho or common blue morpho
  - Morpho peleides Kollar, 1850 – Peleides blue morpho, common morpho, or the emperor
- Species group achilles
  - Morpho achilles (Linnaeus, 1758) – Achilles morpho

Ungrouped:

- Morpho absoloni May, 1924
- Morpho athena Otero, 1966
- Morpho niepelti Röber, 1927

== Coloration ==
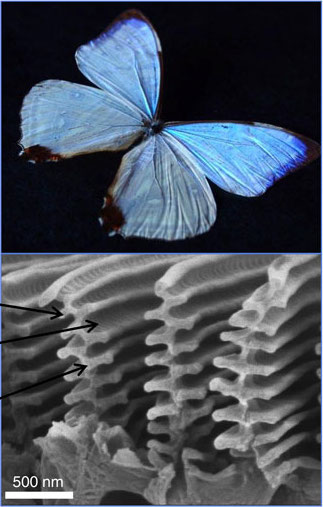
Iridescent colors of Morpho butterflies are caused by the specific nanostructures on their wings (SEM image at the bottom).

Many morpho butterflies are colored in metallic, shimmering shades of blues and greens. These colors are not a result of pigmentation, but are an example of iridescence through structural coloration. Specifically, the microscopic scales covering the morpho's wings reflect incident light repeatedly at successive layers, leading to interference effects that depend on both wavelength and angle of incidence/observance. Thus, the colors appear to vary with viewing angle, but they are surprisingly uniform, perhaps due to the tetrahedral (diamond-like) structural arrangement of the scales or diffraction from overlying cell layers. The wide-angle blue reflection property can be explained by exploring the nanostructures in the scales of the morpho butterfly wings. These optically active structures integrate three design principles leading to the wide-angle reflection: Christmas tree-like shaped ridges, alternating lamellae layers (or "branches"), and a small height offset between neighboring ridges. The reflection spectrum is found to be broad (about 90 nm) for alternating layers and can be controlled by varying the design pattern. The Christmas tree-like pattern helps to reduce the directionality of the reflectance by creating an impedance matching for blue wavelengths. In addition, the height offset between neighboring ridges increases the intensity of reflection for a wide range of angles. This structure may be likened to a photonic crystal. The lamellate structure of their wing scales has been studied as a model in the development of biomimetic fabrics, dye-free paints, and anticounterfeit technology used in currency.

The iridescent lamellae are only present on the dorsal sides of their wings, leaving the ventral sides brown.

The ventral side is decorated with ocelli (eyespots). In some species, such as M. godarti, the dorsal lamellae are so thin that ventral ocelli can peek through. While not all morphos have iridescent coloration, they all have ocelli. In most species, only the males are colorful, supporting the theory that the coloration is used for intrasexual communication between males. The lamellae reflect up to 70% of light falling on them, including any ultraviolet. The eyes of morpho butterflies are thought to be highly sensitive to UV light, so the males are able to see each other from great distances. Some South American species are reportedly visible to the human eye up to one kilometer away.

Also, a number of other species exist which are tawny orange or dark brown (for instance M. hecuba and M. telemachus). Some species are white, principal among these being M. catenarius and M. laertes. An unusual species, fundamentally white in coloration, but which exhibits a stunning pearlescent purple and teal iridescence when viewed at certain angles, is the rare M. sulkowskyi. Some Andean species are small and delicate (M. lympharis). Among the metallic blue Morpho species, M. rhetenor stands out as the most iridescent of all, and because the wavelengths of light reflected by its wings fall almost entirely in the range of 400-550nm, its coloration cannot normally be reproduced accurately in digital images. M. cypris is notable in that specimens mounted in entomological collections exhibit color differences across the wings if they are not 'set' perfectly flat. Many species, like M. cypris and M. rhetenor helena have a white stripe pattern on their colored blue wings as well.

Celebrated author and lepidopterist Vladimir Nabokov described their appearance as "shimmering light-blue mirrors".

=== Sexual dimorphism ===
The blue morpho species exhibit sexual dimorphism. In some species (for instance M.adonis, M. eugenia, M. aega, M. cypris, and M. rhetenor), only the males are iridescent blue; the females are disruptively colored brown and yellow. In other species (for instance M. anaxibia, M. godarti, M. didius, M. amathonte, and M. deidamia), the females are partially iridescent, but less blue than the males.

== Habitat ==
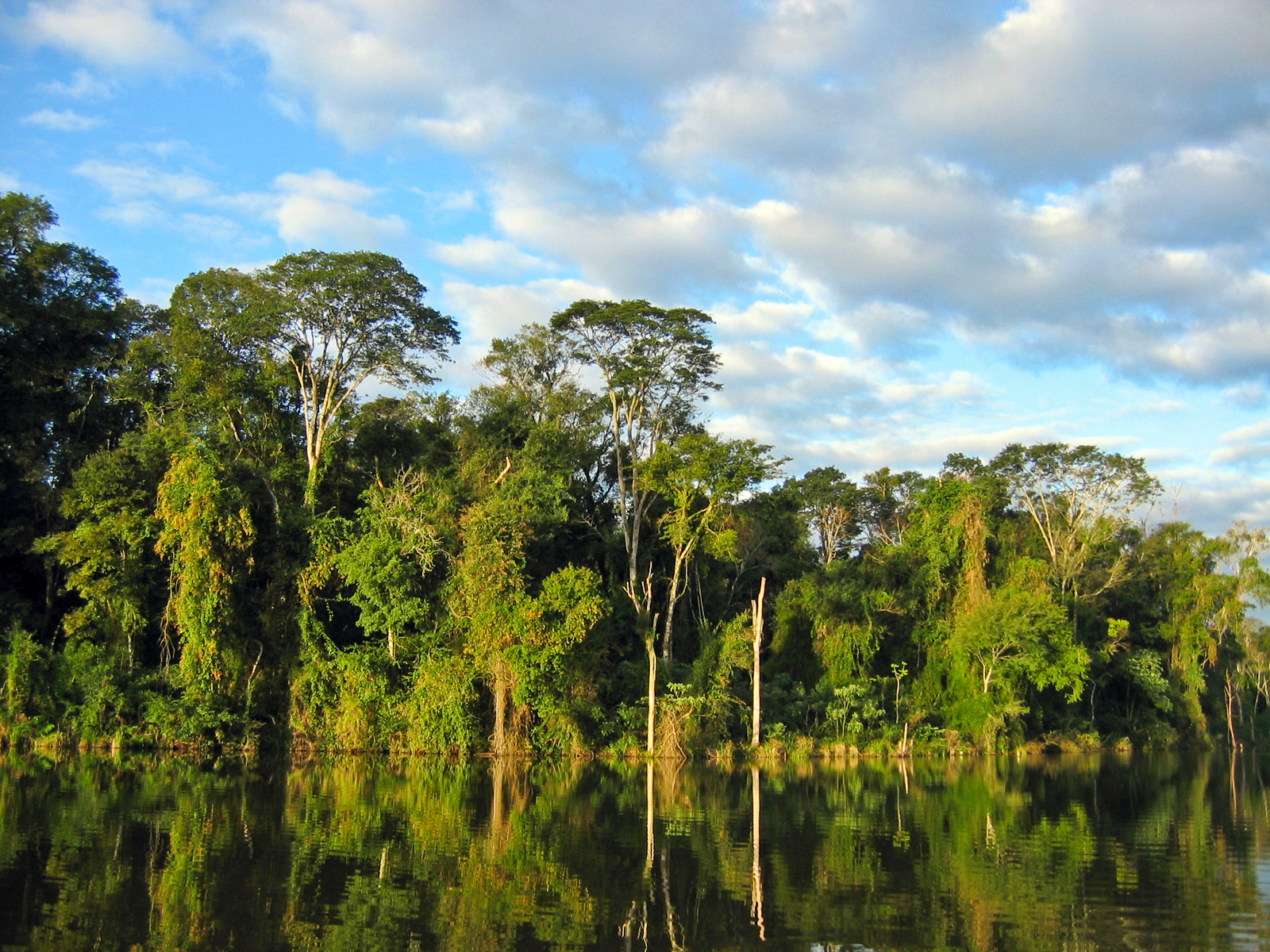
Atlantic Forest in Paraguay

Morpho butterflies inhabit the primary forests of the Amazon and Atlantic. They also adapted to breed in a wide variety of other forested habitats – for instance, the dry deciduous woodlands of Nicaragua and secondary forests. Morphos are found at altitudes between sea level and about 1,400 m (4,600 ft).

== Biology ==
- Morphos are diurnal, as males spend the mornings patrolling along the courses of forest streams and rivers. They are territorial and chase any rivals. Morphos typically live alone, excluding in the mating season.
- The genus Morpho is palatable, but some species (such as M. amathonte) are very strong fliers; birds—even species which are specialized for catching butterflies on the wing—find it very hard to catch them. The conspicuous blue coloration shared by most Morpho species may be a case of Müllerian mimicry, or may be 'pursuit aposematism'.
- The eyespots on the undersides of the wings of both males and females may be a form of automimicry in which a spot on the body of an animal resembles an eye of a different animal to deceive potential predator or prey species, to draw a predator's attention away from the most vulnerable body parts, or to appear as an inedible or even dangerous animal.
- Predators include royal flycatchers, jacamars and other insectivorous birds, frogs, and lizards.

== Behavior ==
Morphos have a very distinctive, slow, bouncy flight pattern due to the wing area being enormous relative to the body size.

== Life cycle ==
The entire life cycle of the morpho butterfly, from egg to adult, is about 69–75 days.

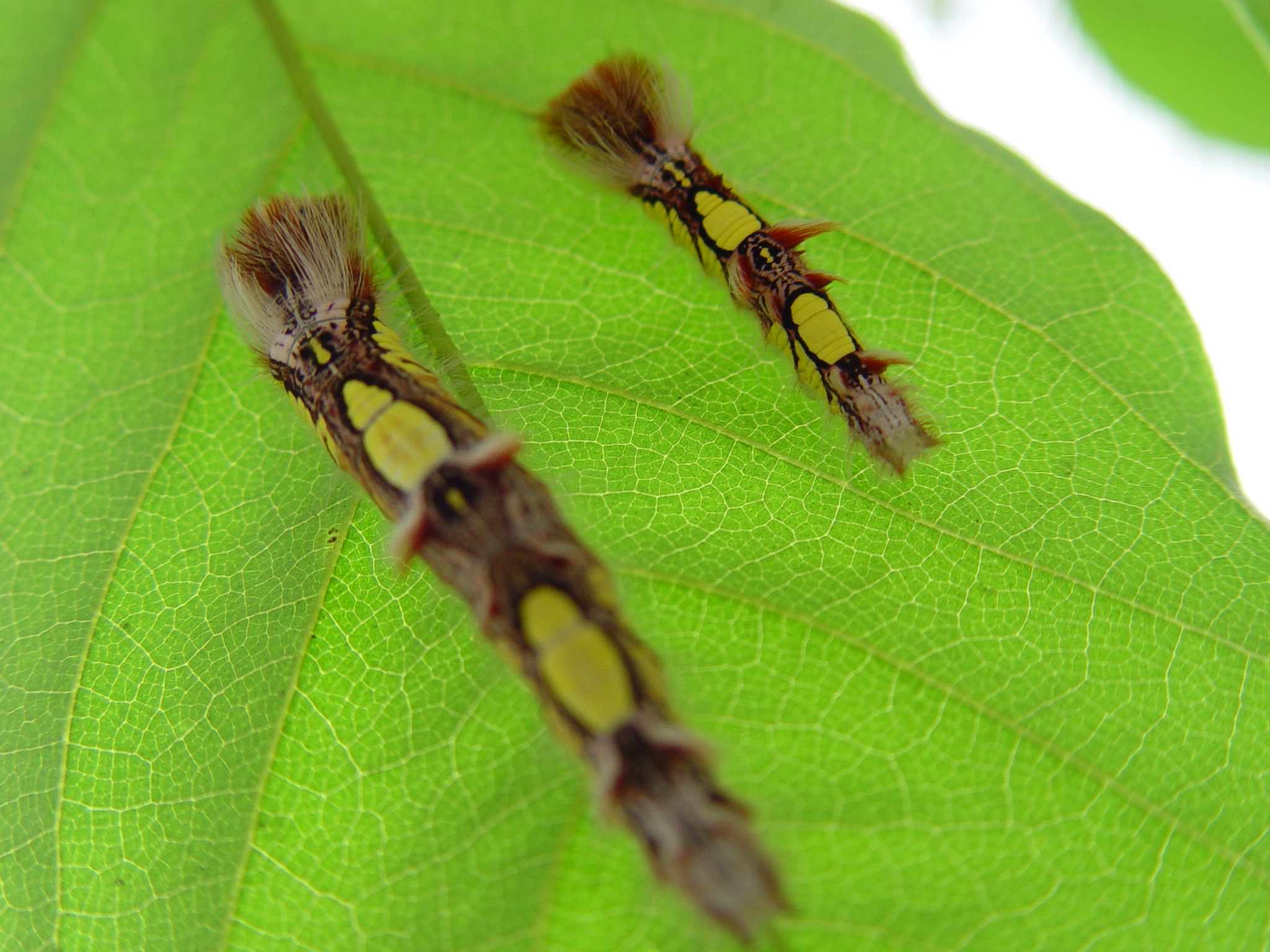
Caterpillars

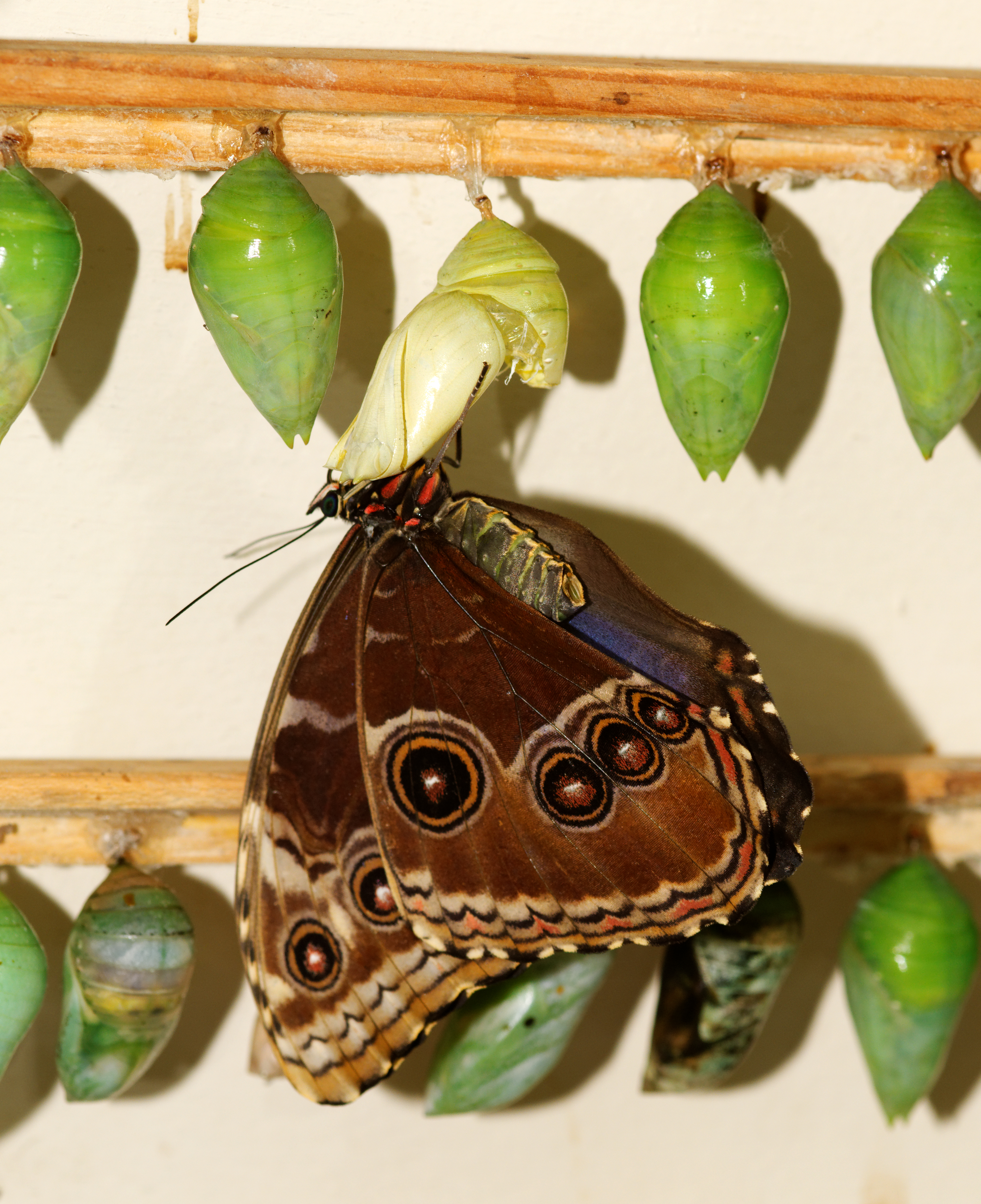
Pupae and emerging adult

The larvae hatch from pale-green, dewdrop-like eggs. The caterpillars have reddish-brown bodies with bright lime-green or yellow patches on their backs. Its hairs are irritating to human skin, and when disturbed it secretes a fluid that smells like rancid butter from eversible glands on the thorax. The strong odor is a defense against predators. They feed on a variety of plants. The caterpillar molts five times before entering the pupal stage. The bulbous chrysalis is pale green or jade green and emits a repulsive, ultrasonic sound when touched. It is suspended from a stem or leaf of the food plant.

The adults live for about two to three weeks. They feed on the fluids of fermenting fruit, decomposing animals, tree sap, fungi, and nutrient-rich mud. They are poisonous to predators due to toxins they sequestered from plants on which they fed as caterpillars.

The more common blue morphos are reared en masse in commercial breeding programs. The iridescent wings are used in the manufacture of jewelry and as inlay in woodworking. Papered specimens are sold with the abdomen removed to prevent its oily contents from staining the wings. Significant numbers of live specimens are exported as pupae from several Neotropical countries for exhibition in butterfly houses. Unfortunately, due to their irregular flight pattern and size, their wings are frequently damaged when in captivity.

== Host plants ==
Morpho larvae, variously according to species and region, feed on Leguminosae, Gramineae, Canellaceae, Guttiferae, Erythroxylaceae, Myrtaceae, Moraceae, Lauraceae, Sapindaceae, Rhamnaceae, Euphorbiaceae, Musaceae, Palmae, Menispermaceae, Tiliaceae, Bignoniaceae, and Menispermaceae.

According to Penz and DeVries the ancestral diet of larval Satyrinae is Poaceae or other monocots. Many morphos have switched to feeding on dicots on several occasions during their evolutionary history, but some species have retained monocot diets.

== Collectors ==
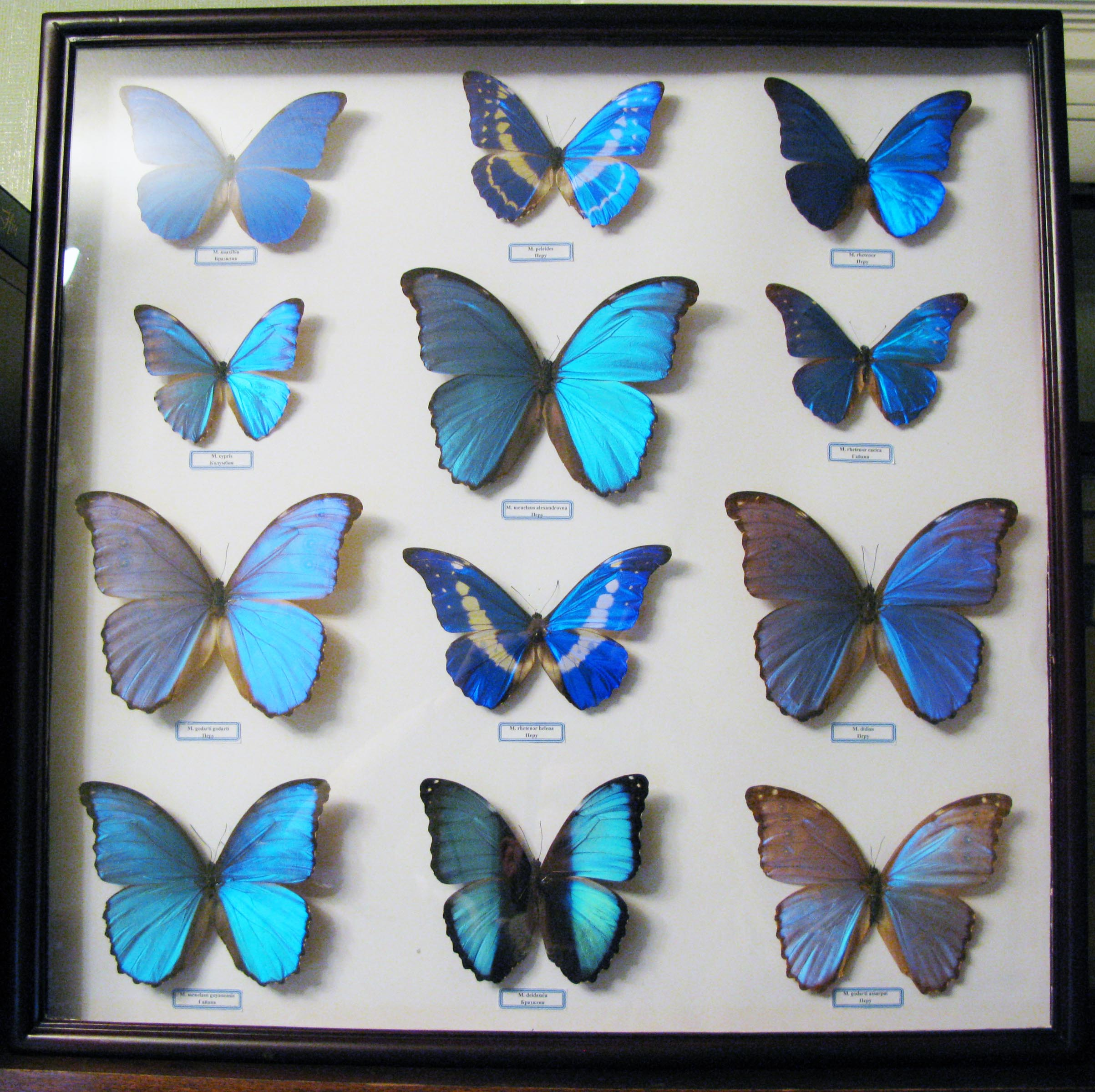
A morpho butterfly collection

Morpho butterflies, often very expensive, have always been prized by extremely wealthy collectors. Famous collections include those of the London jeweler Dru Drury and the Dutch merchant Pieter Teyler van der Hulst, the Paris diplomat Georges Rousseau-Decelle, the financier Walter Rothschild, the Romanov Grand Duke Nicholas Mikhailovich of Russia and the, English and German respectively, businessmen James John Joicey and Curt Eisner. In earlier years, Morphos graced cabinets of curiosities "Kunstkamera" and royal cabinets of natural history notably those of Tsar of Russia Peter the Great, the Austrian empress Maria Theresa and Ulrika Eleonora, Queen of Sweden. More famous is Maria Sibylla Merian, who was not wealthy.

The people along the Rio Negro in Brazil once exploited the territorial habits of the blue morpho (M. menelaus) by luring them into clearings with bright blue decoys. The collected butterfly wings were used as embellishment for ceremonial masks. Adult morpho butterflies feed on the juices of fermenting fruit with which they may also be lured. The butterflies wobble in flight and are easy to catch.

== Gallery ==
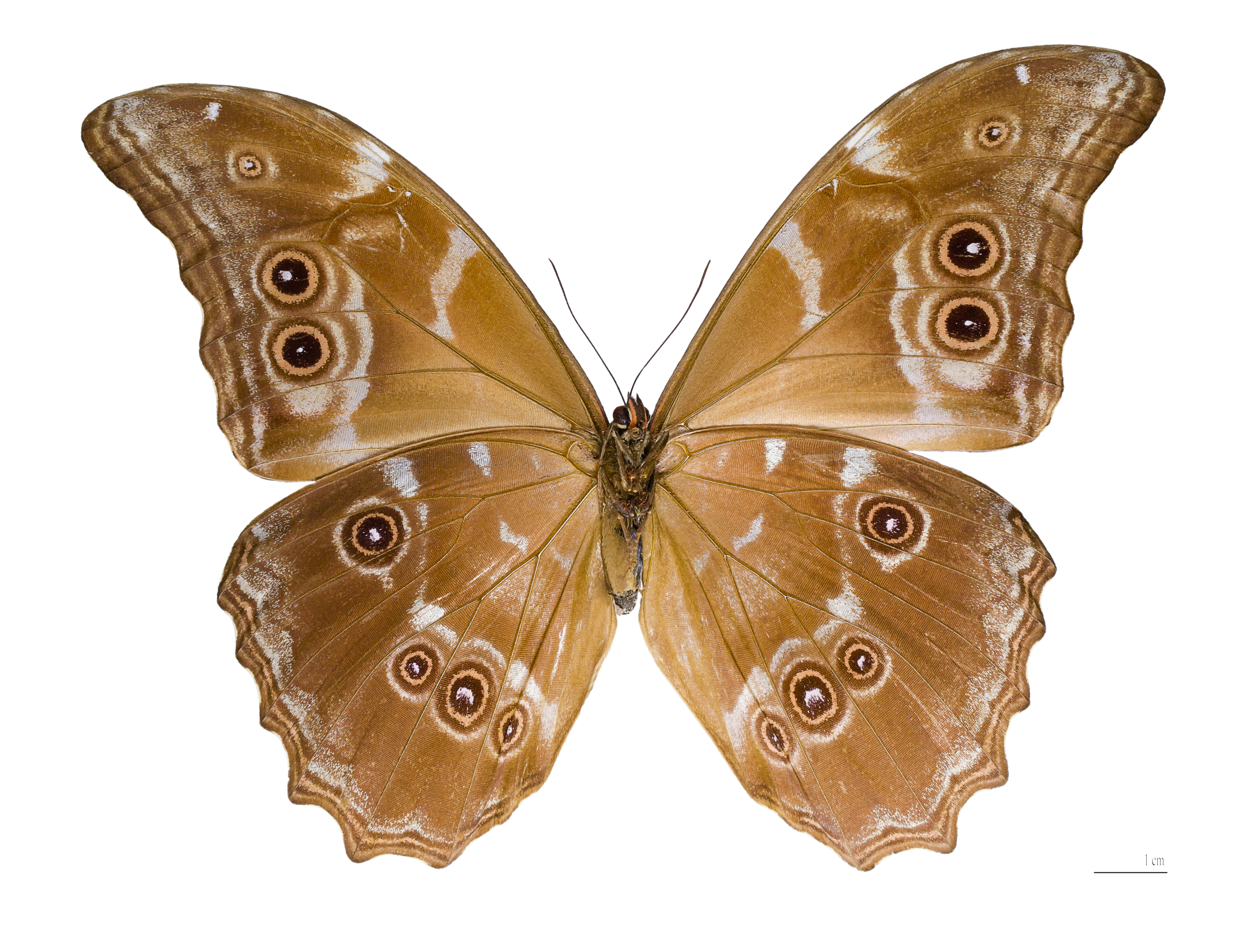
M. didius – ventral side: Predatory birds aim their attack at the most prominent feature, the ocelli, missing the body entirely.

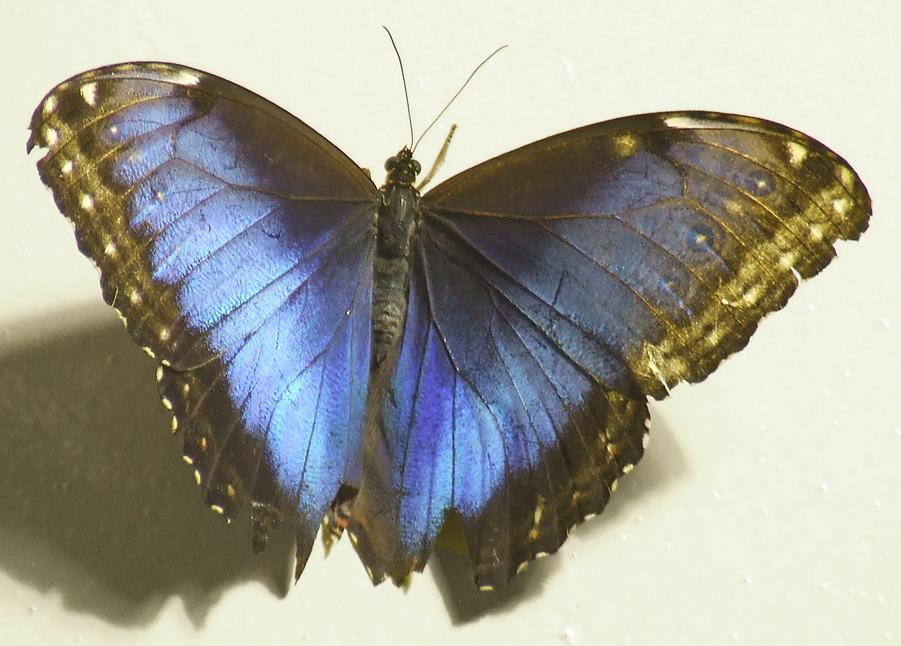
M. peleides, note the symmetric notches left by a bird beak

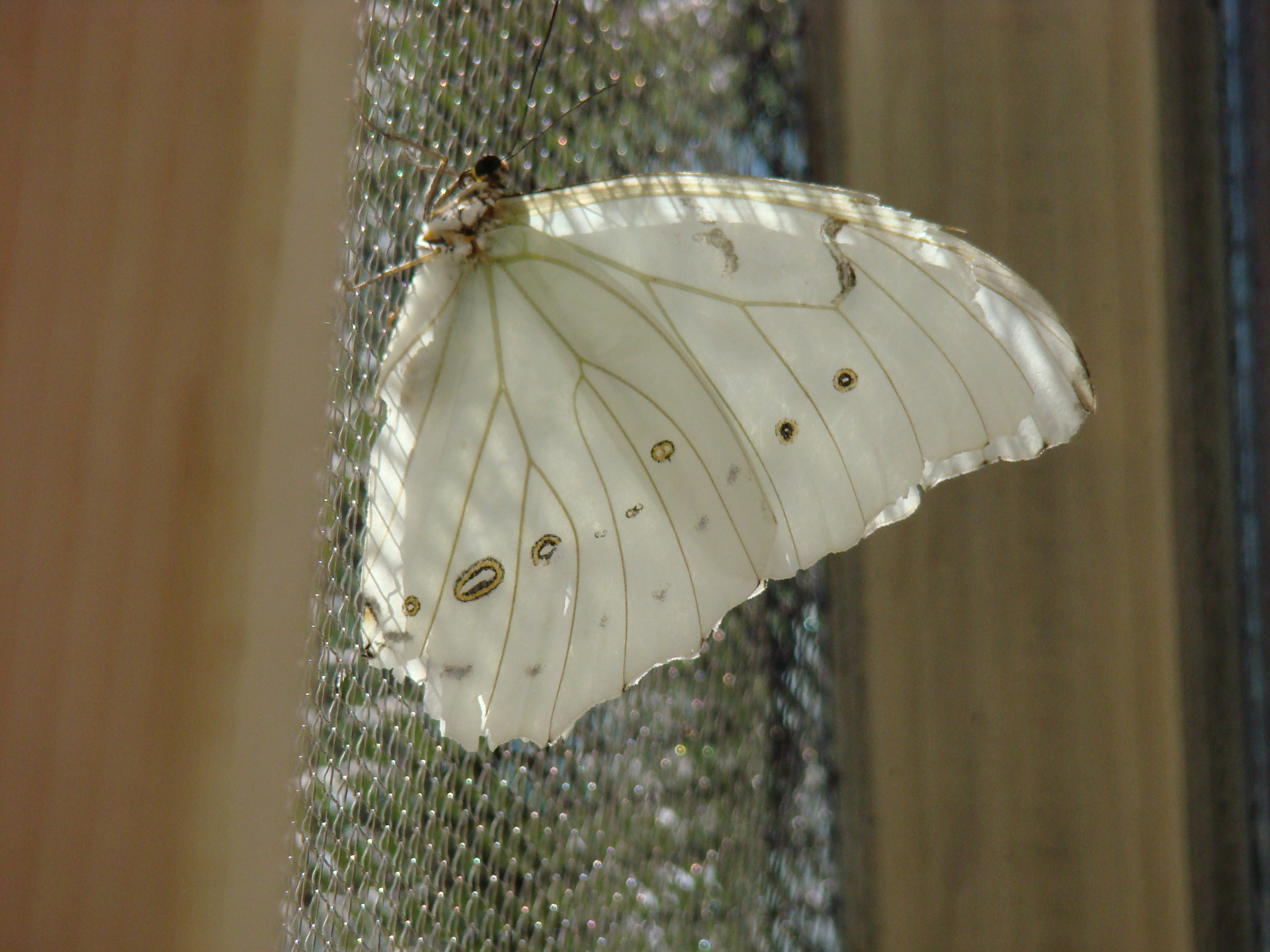
M. polyphemus, one of several "white morpho" species

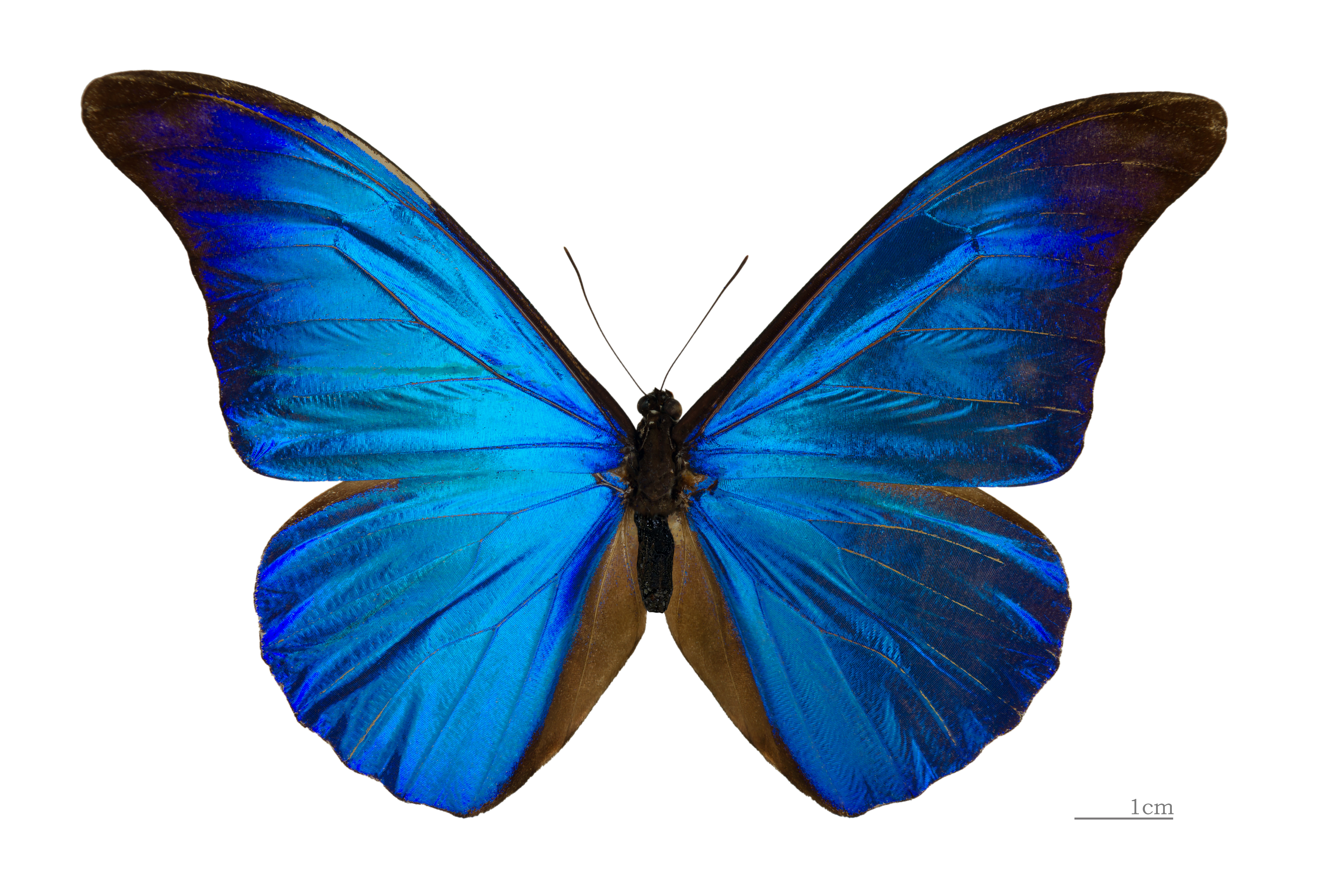
M. rhetenor – this museum specimen is used for education, but thousands are killed for domestic displays, sold to tourists or in gift shops.

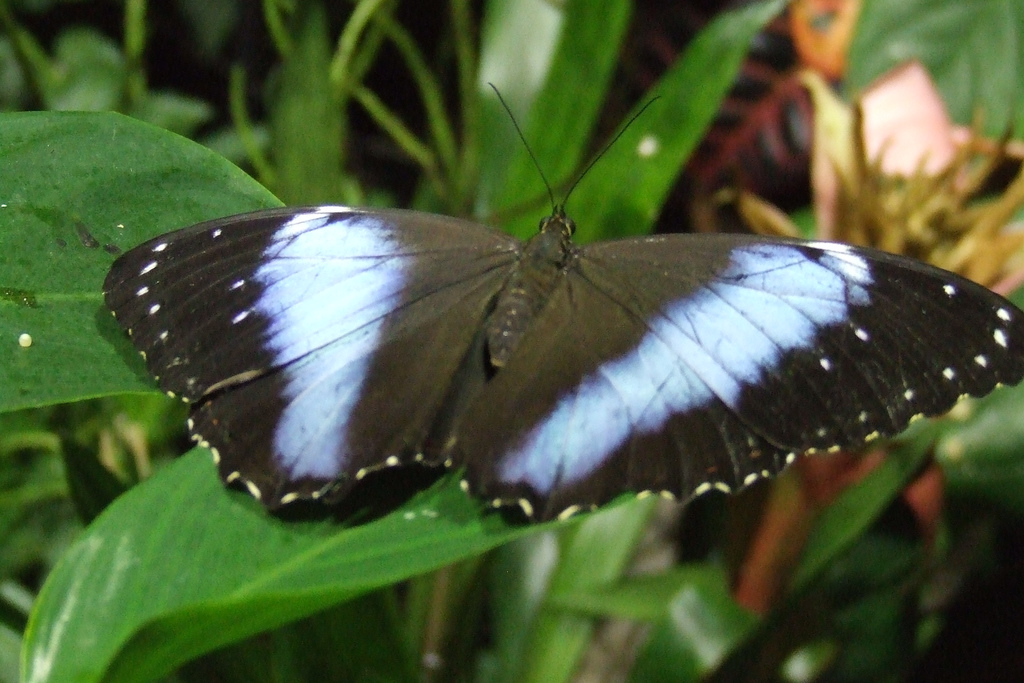
M. richardus sunning itself for warmth

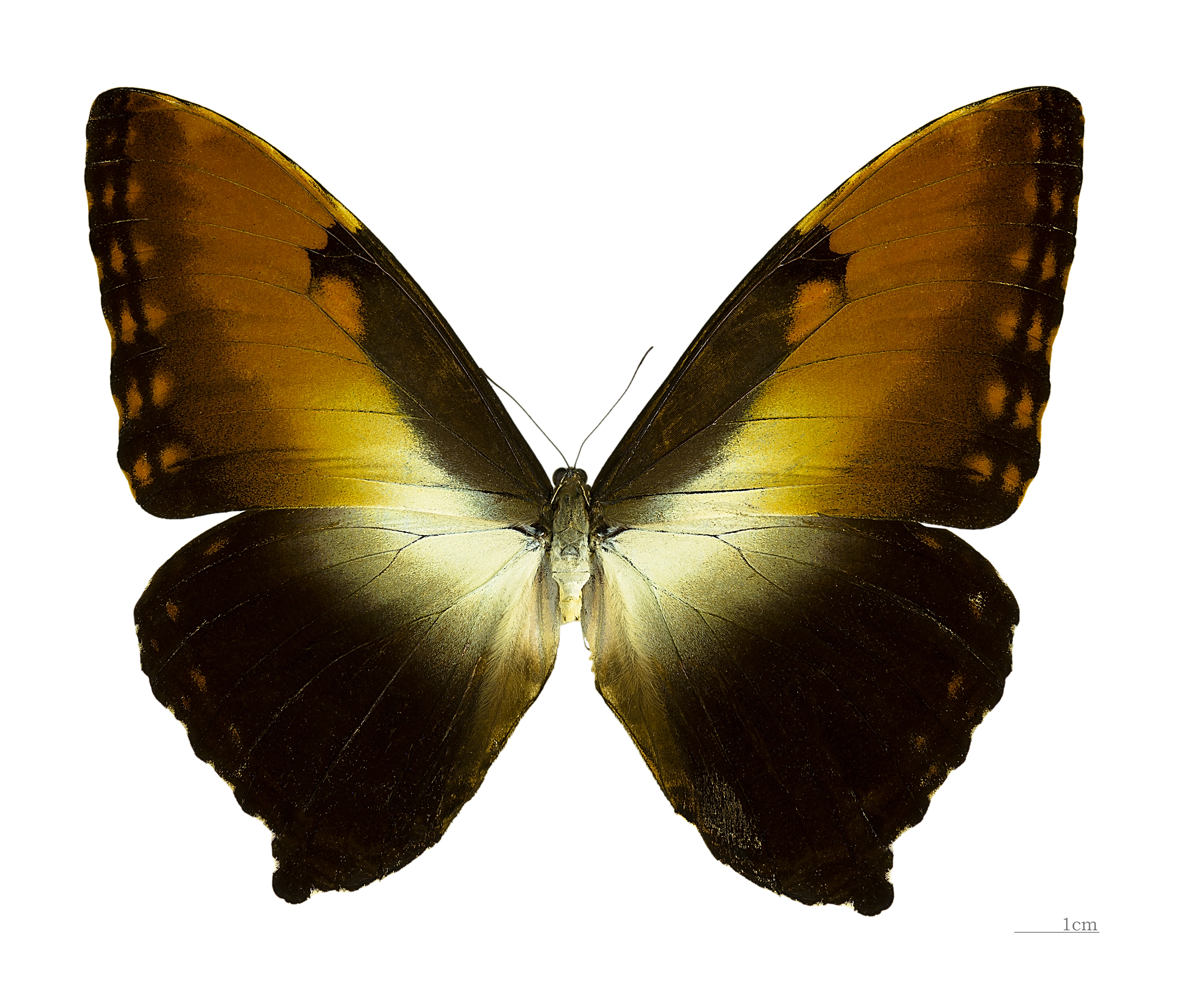
M. hecuba, the largest morpho, with a wingspan of up to 20 cm (7.9 in)

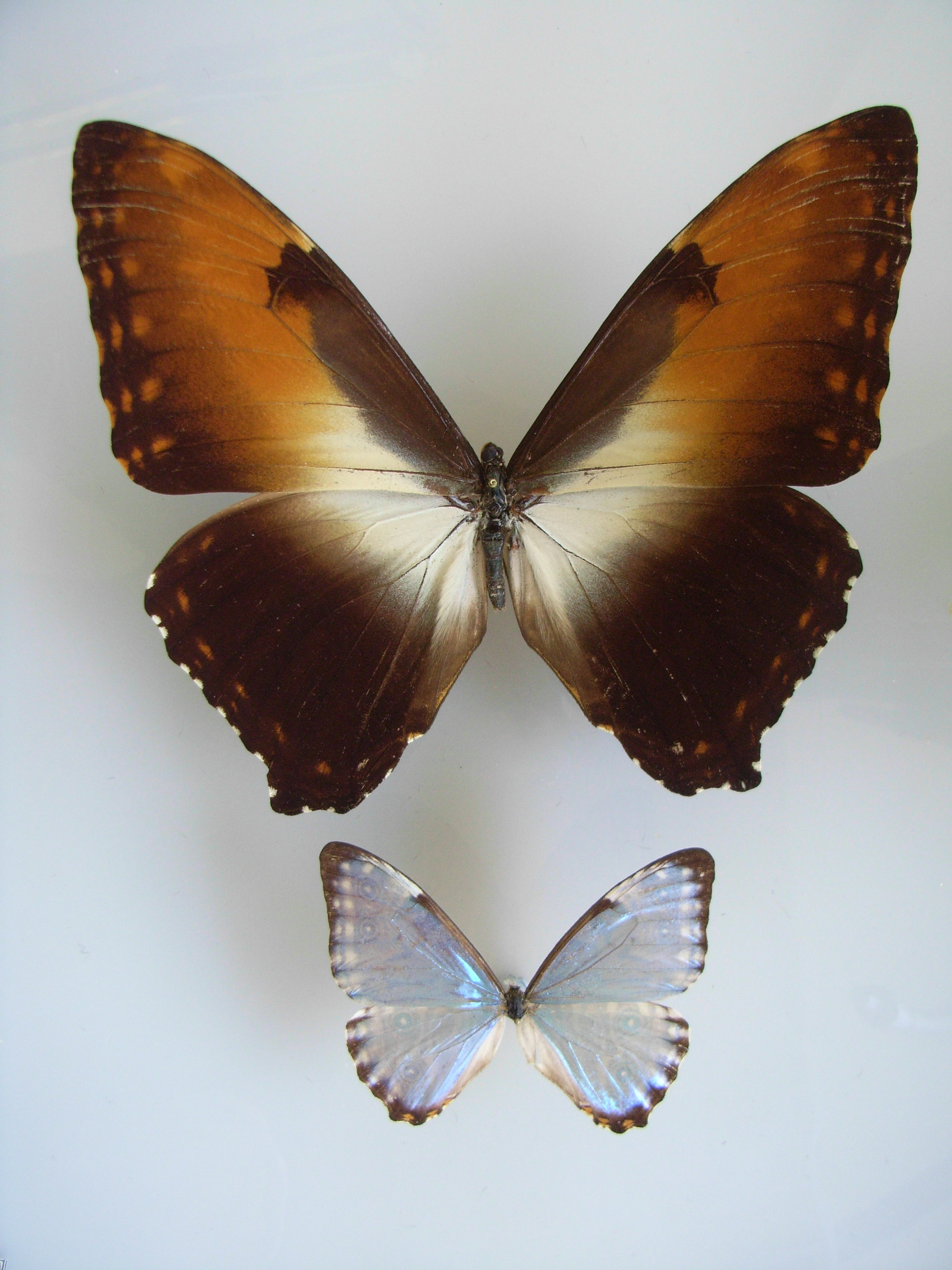
M. hecuba size comparison with M. thamyris (M. portis)

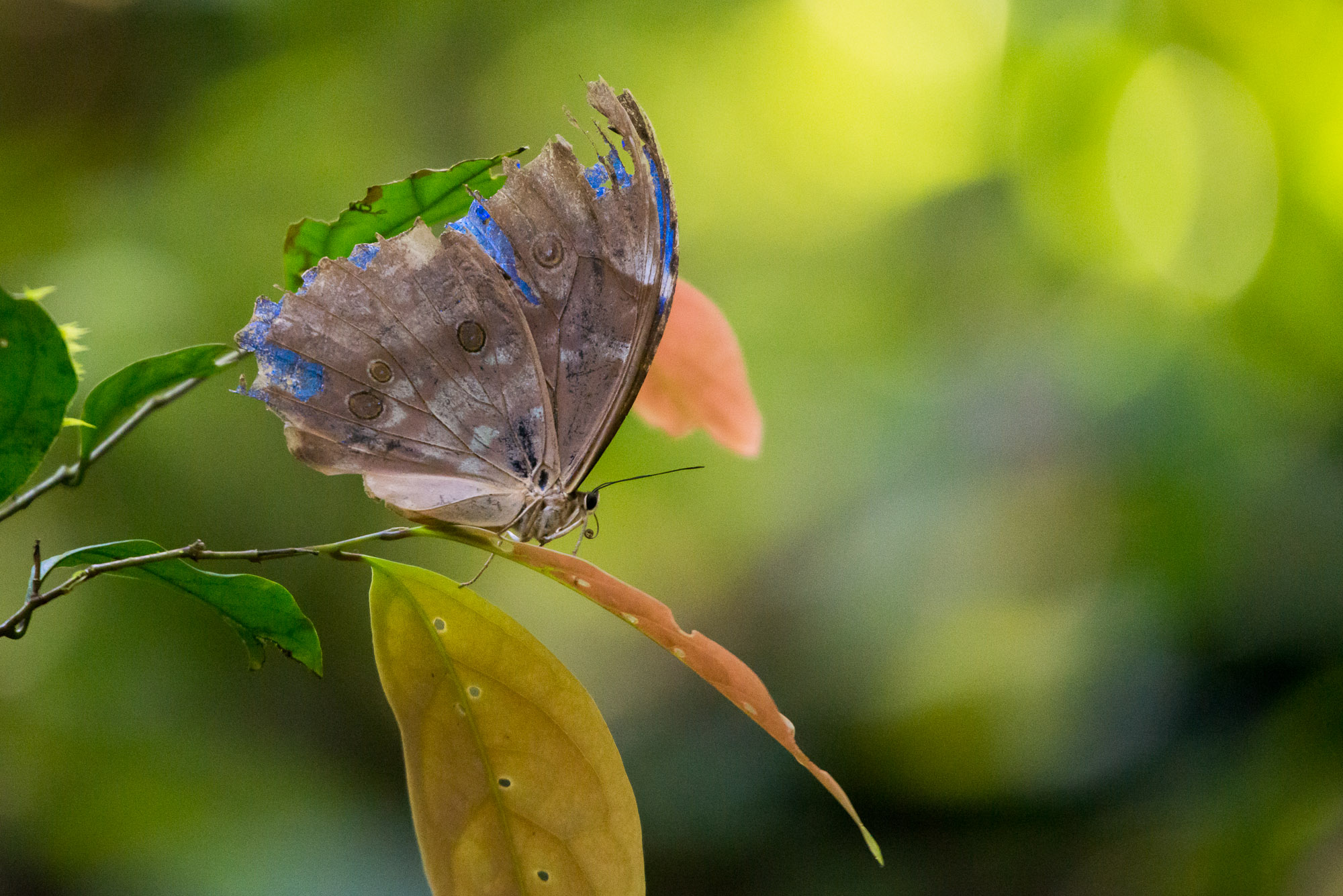
The closed wings of this morpho butterfly are damaged, allowing some of the blue to show.

== Illustrations ==
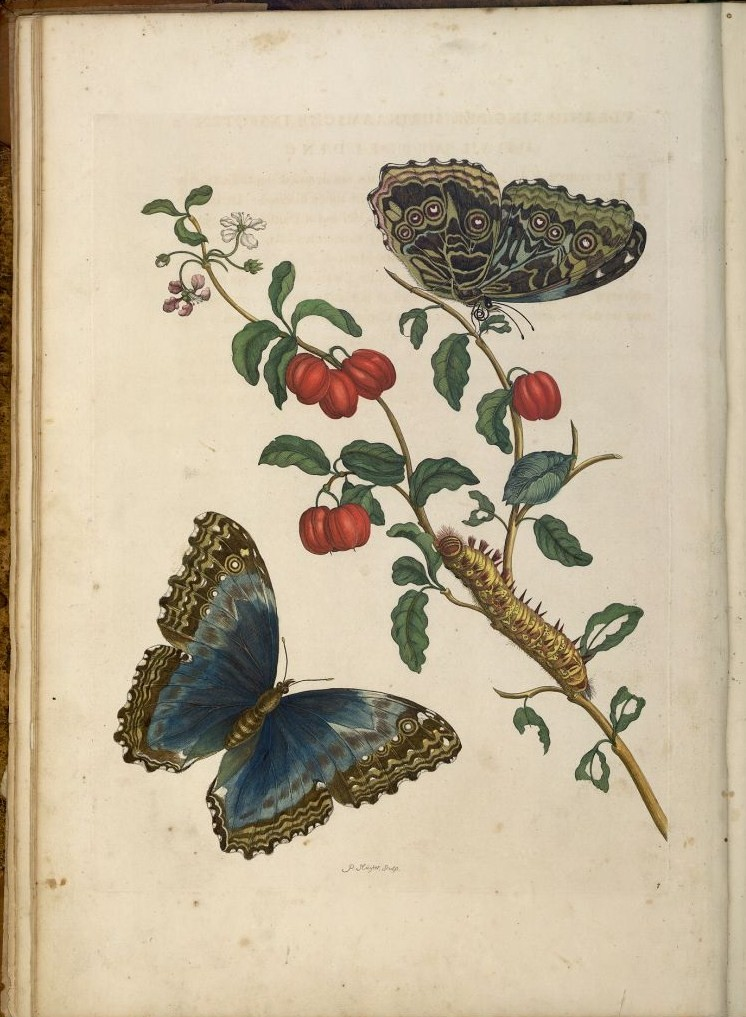
Maria Sibylla Merian Metamorphosis Insectorum Surinamensium 1705

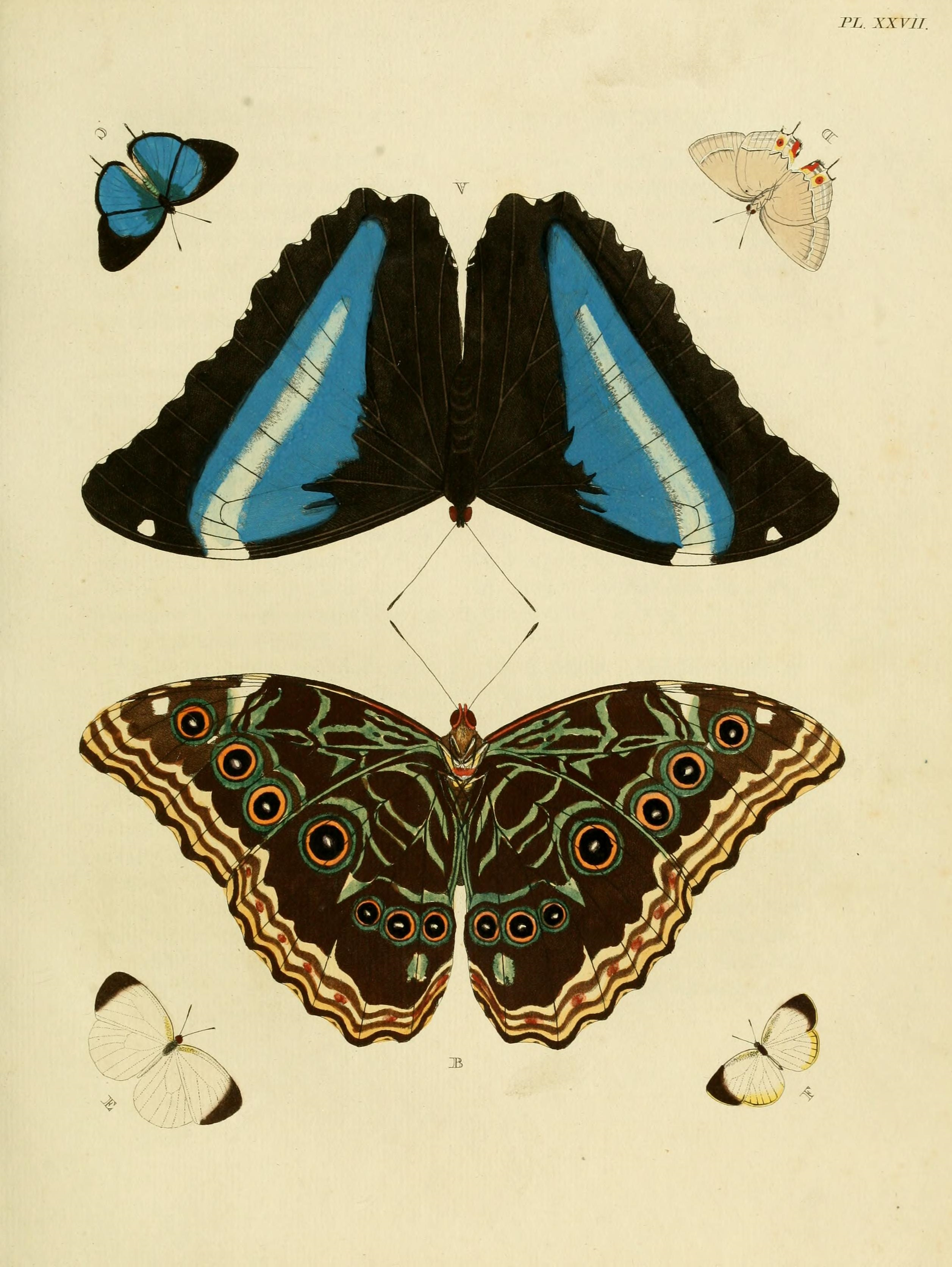
Pieter Cramer and Caspar Stoll De Uitlandsche Kapellen 1775–1782

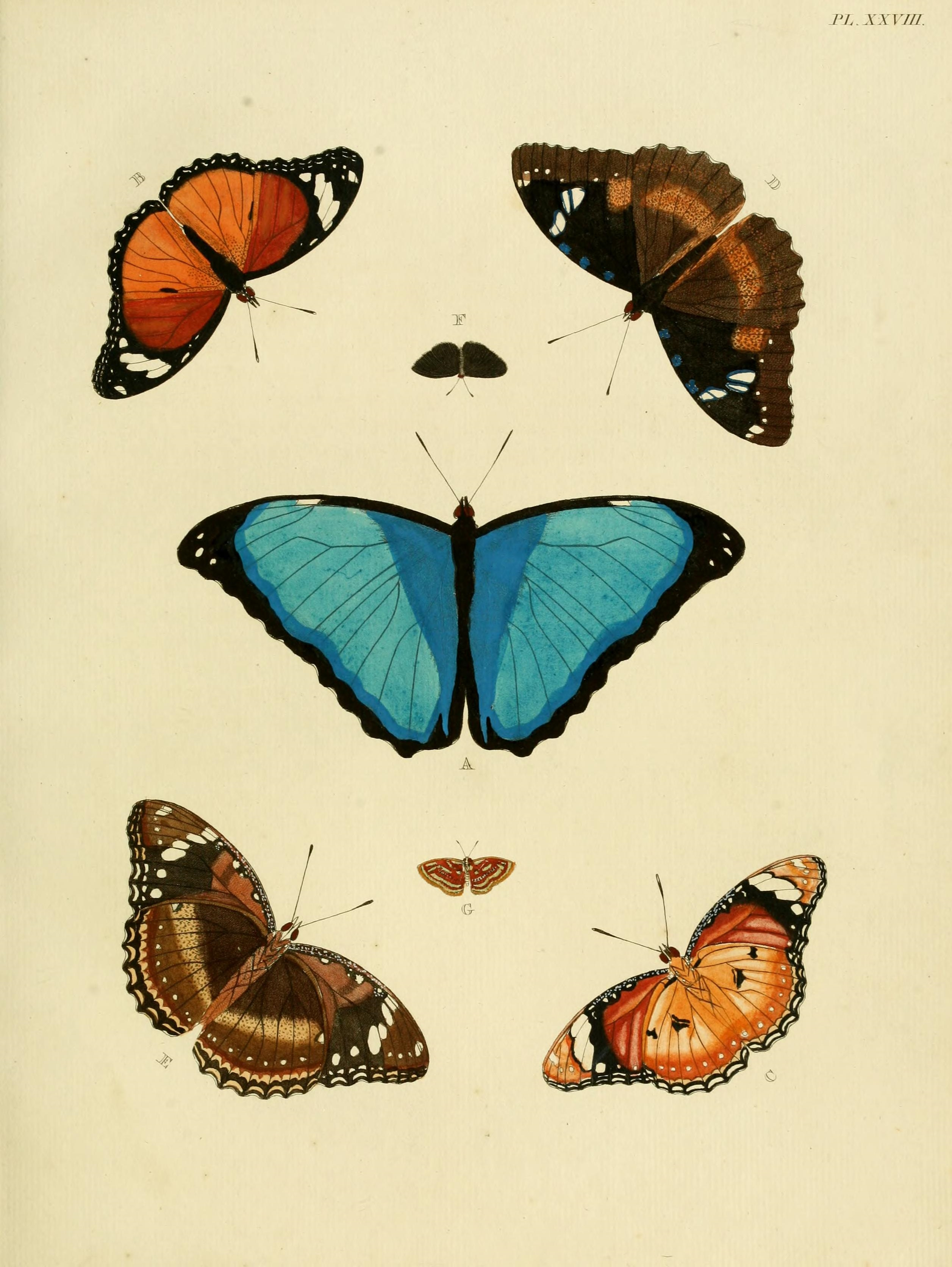
Pieter Cramer and Caspar Stoll De Uitlandsche Kapellen 1775–1782

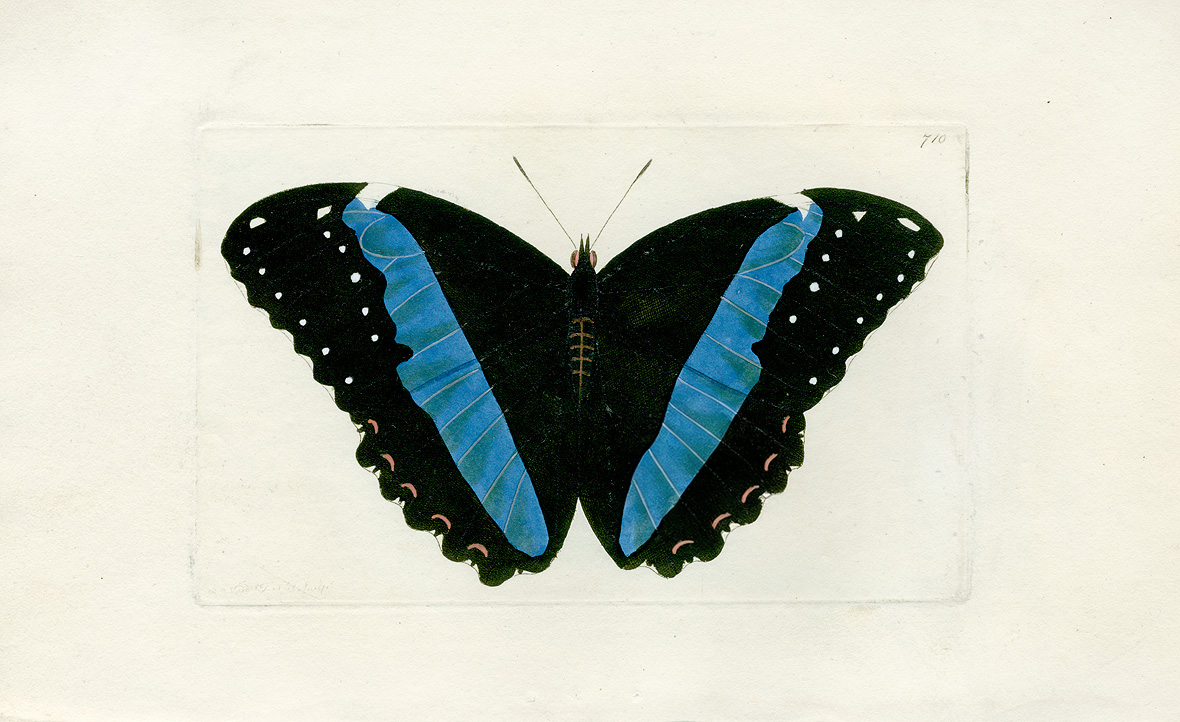
George Shaw and Frederick Polydore NodderThe Naturalist's Miscellany 1789–1813

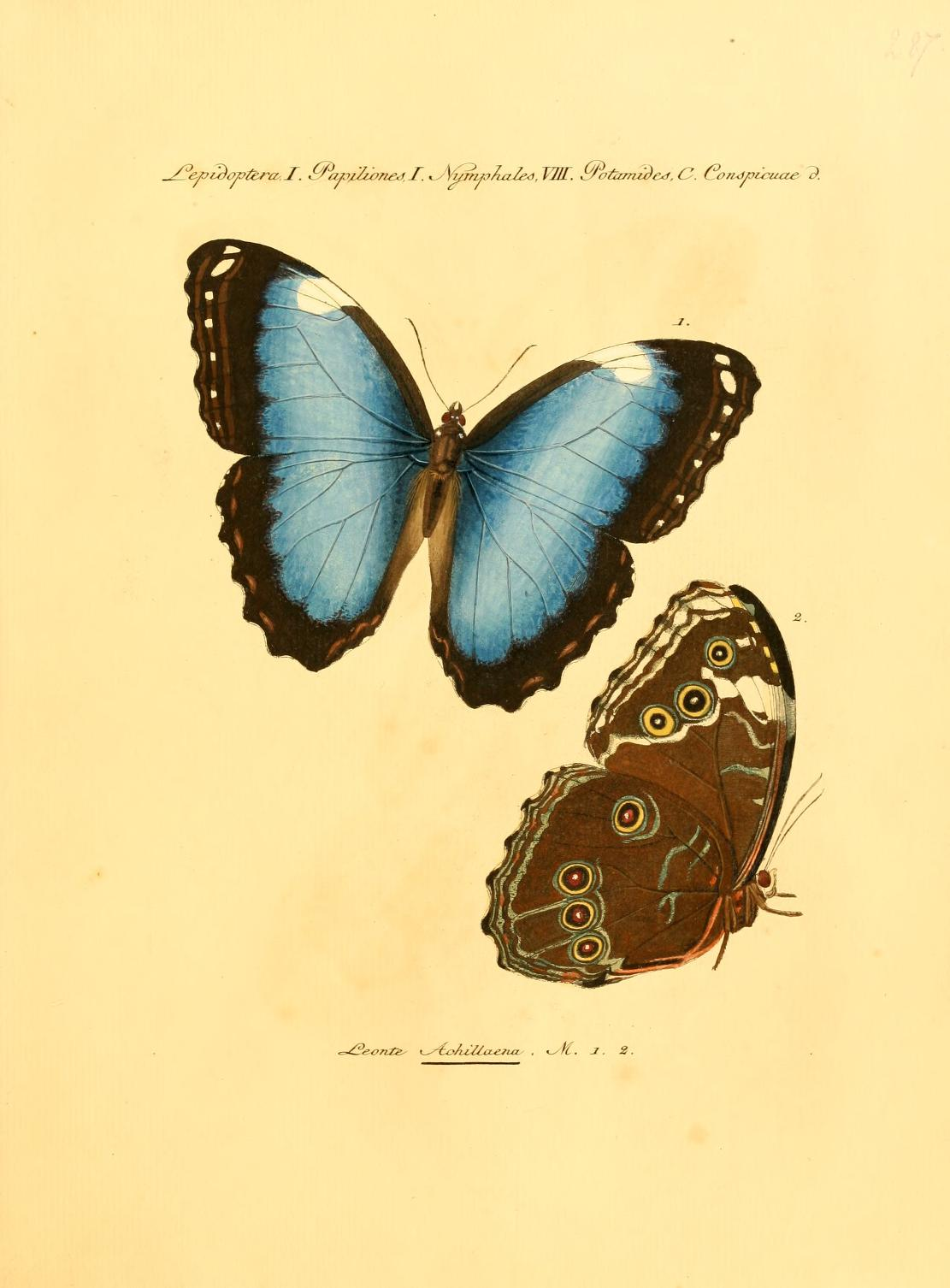
Hübner Sammlung exotischer Schmetterlinge Augsburg [1806-1841]

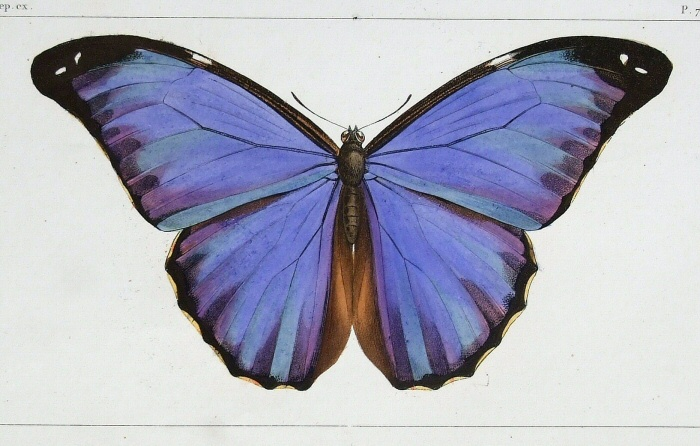
Hippolyte Lucas Histoire Naturelle des Lepidopteres Exotiques Paris,1835.

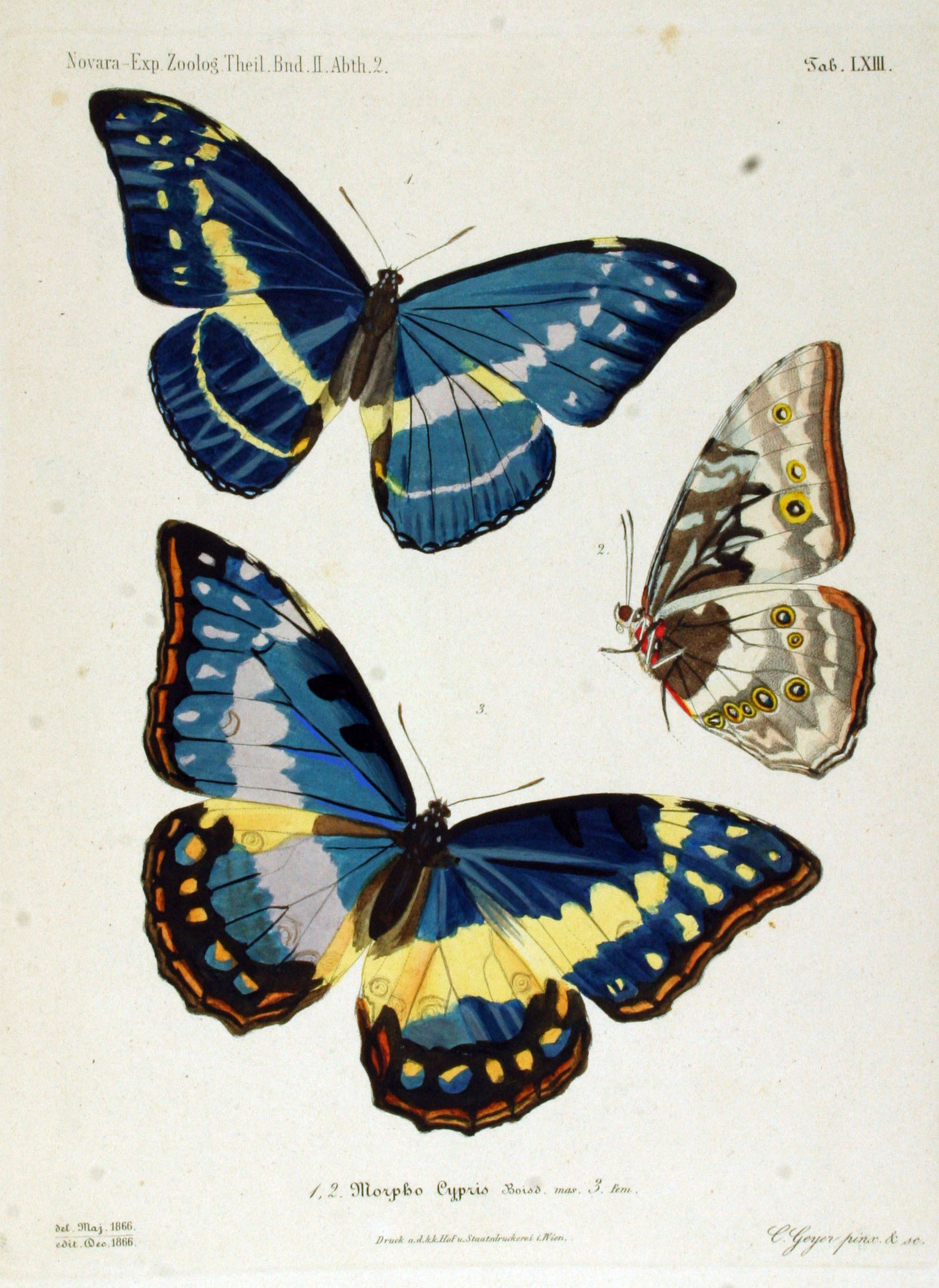
Cajetan and Rudolf Felder Reise der Österreichischen Fregatte Novara um die Erde in den Jahren 1857, 1858, 1859

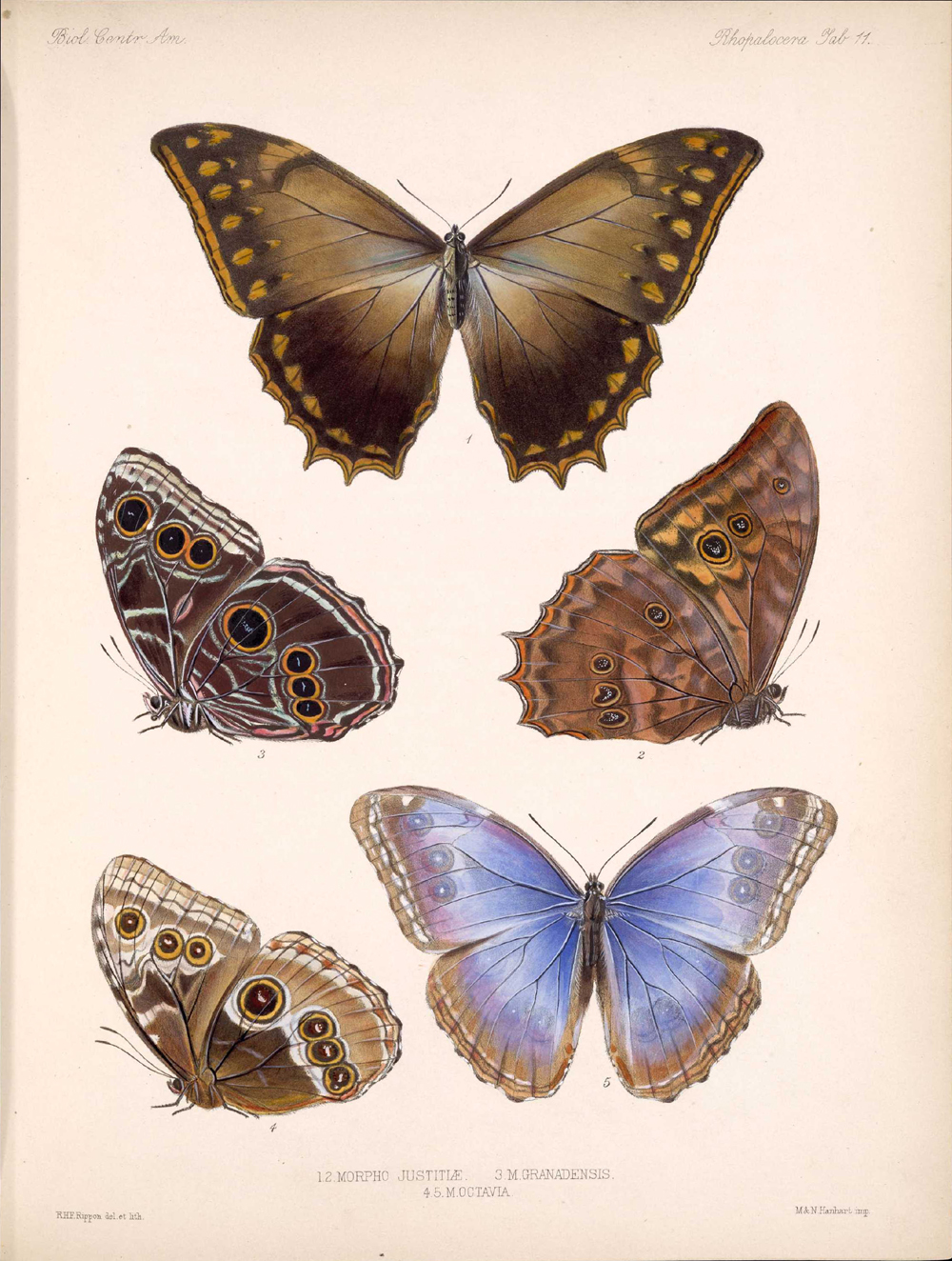
Frederick DuCane Godman and Osbert Salvin Biologia Centrali-Americana 1879–1915

Adalbert Seitz Die Gross-Schmetterlinge der Erde 1860–1938

== See also ==
- Arhopala
- List of tropical and subtropical moist broadleaf forests ecoregions (Neotropical)
- Tropical Andes
