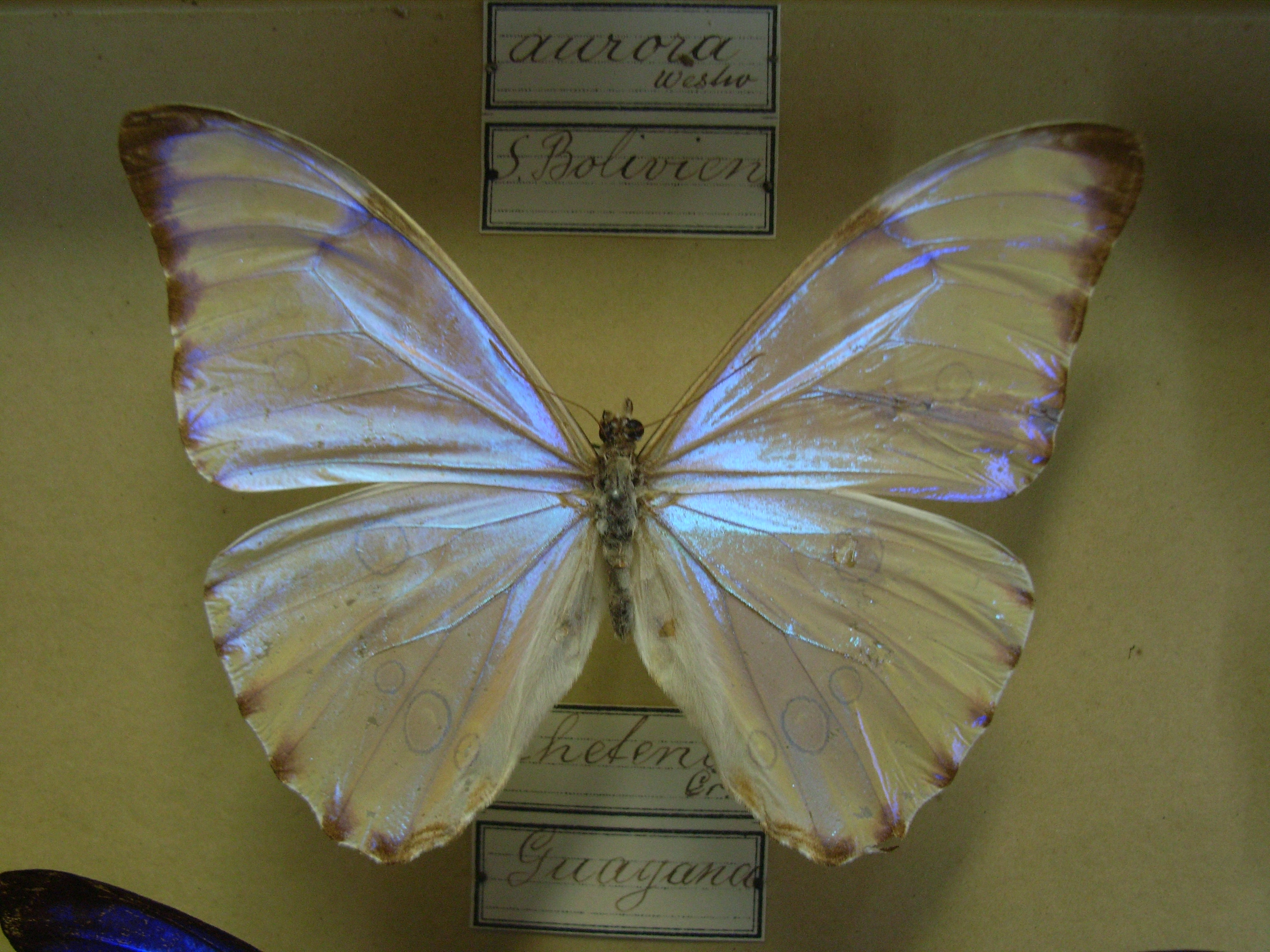

Scientific classification
- Domain: Eukaryota
- Kingdom: Animalia
- Phylum: Arthropoda
- Class: Insecta
- Order: Lepidoptera
- Family: Nymphalidae
- Genus: Morpho
- Species: M. aurora

Binomial name
- Morpho aurora (Westwood, 1851)

= Morpho aurora =

Aurora morpho

Species of butterfly

Morpho aurora, the Aurora morpho, is a Neotropical butterfly found in Bolivia and Peru.

M. aurora is similar to Morpho portis in the shape of the wings and the arrangement of the black distal spots. Upper surface with light blue, distally darkening gloss. Under surface grey white, with mother-of-pearl gloss, basal area purple. The ocelli show through distinctly above and are yellow in the middle with white crescents and sharply ringed with black. On the forewing four or five, on the hindwing always four eyespots, the apical one sometimes doubled, being accompanied anteriorly by a halved eyespot. The species flies rather high; Garlepp met with it at Cocapata in Bolivia at elevations of about 2600 m.

== Etymology ==
Aurora is the goddess of dawn in Roman mythology.

== Subspecies ==
- Morpho aurora aurora Westwood, 1851; occurs in Bolivia and Peru
- Morpho aurora aureola Fruhstorfer, 1913; occurs in Peru
