= Morpho absoloni =

Scientific classification
- Domain: Eukaryota
- Kingdom: Animalia
- Phylum: Arthropoda
- Class: Insecta
- Order: Lepidoptera
- Family: Nymphalidae
- Genus: Morpho
- Species: M. absoloni

Binomial name
- Morpho absoloni May, 1924

Species of butterfly

Morpho absoloni is a Neotropical butterfly.

== Description ==
Morpho absoloni is a large butterfly with a wingspan of approximately 100 mm. The upperside of the male forewings is fluorescent metallic blue. There is a black mark at the apex of the wings which have a concave outer edge. The underside is brown with a line of ocelli.

== Distribution ==
This species is present in Brazil and Peru.
