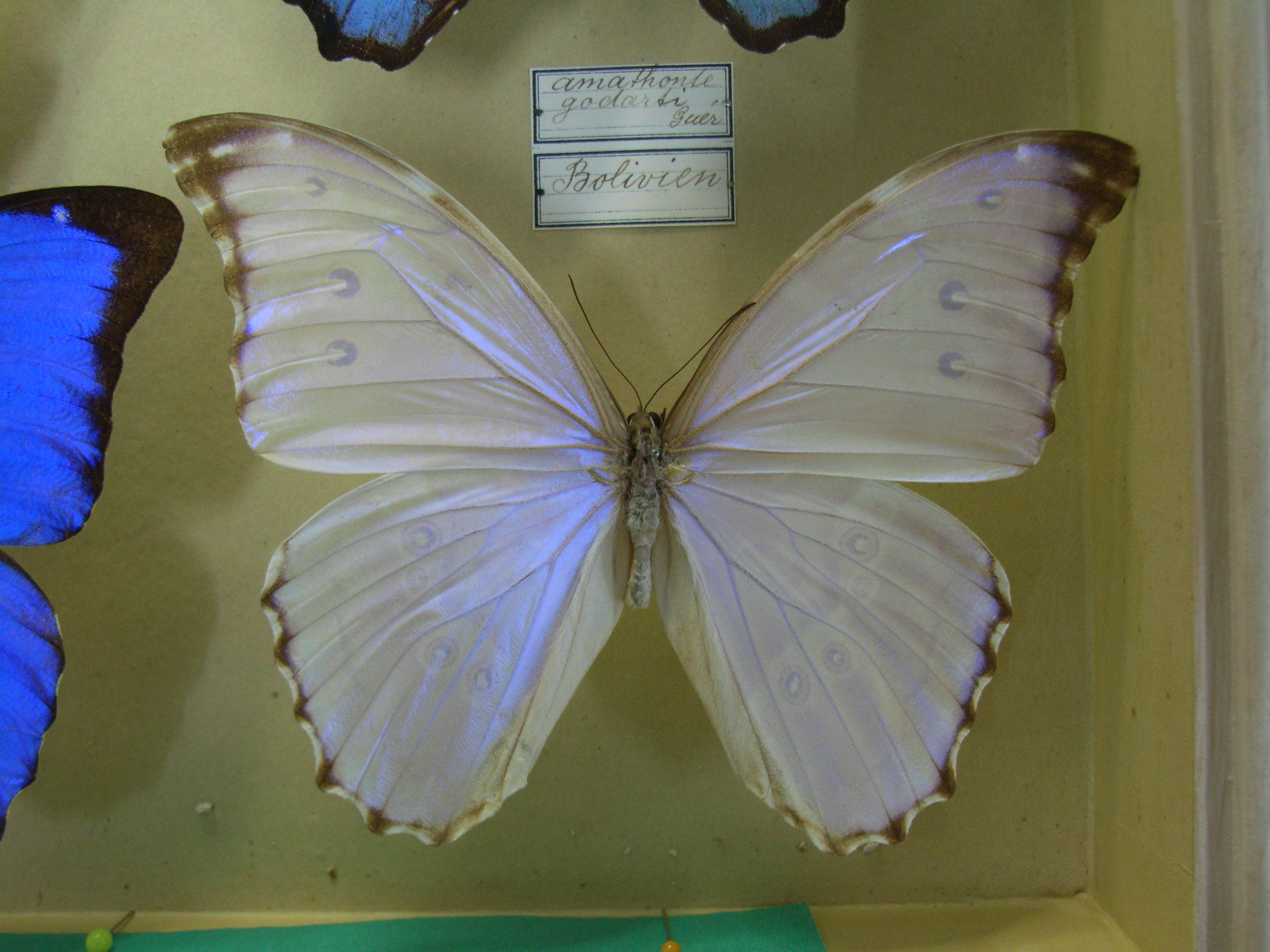
- Museum Wiesbaden

Scientific classification
- Domain: Eukaryota
- Kingdom: Animalia
- Phylum: Arthropoda
- Class: Insecta
- Order: Lepidoptera
- Family: Nymphalidae
- Genus: Morpho
- Species: M. godarti

Binomial name
- Morpho godarti (Guérin-Méneville, 1844)

= Morpho godarti =

Godart's morpho

Species of butterfly

Morpho godarti, or Godart's morpho, is a Neotropical butterfly found in Peru and Bolivia.

== Etymology ==
The butterfly was named to honour the French entomologist Jean Baptiste Godart.
