= Morpho uraneis =

Scientific classification
- Domain: Eukaryota
- Kingdom: Animalia
- Phylum: Arthropoda
- Class: Insecta
- Order: Lepidoptera
- Family: Nymphalidae
- Genus: Morpho
- Species: M. uraneis

Binomial name
- Morpho uraneis Bates, 1865

Synonyms
- Morpho (Cytheritis) f. neptunus Le Moult & Réal, 1962; Morpho (Cytheritis) uraneis zodiaca Le Moult & Réal, 1962; Morpho (Cytheritis) uraneis zodiaca f. macas Le Moult & Réal, 1962; Morpho (Cytheritis) uraneis biedermanni Le Moult & Réal, 1962; Morpho (Cytheritis) uraneis biedermanni f. carbonaria Le Moult & Réal, 1962

Species of butterfly

Morpho uraneis is a Neotropical butterfly. It is found in Brazil (Amazonas, Pará) and Ecuador.

== Description ==
Morpho uraneis is a large butterfly. The forewings have a concave outer edge. The upperside is dark iridescent blue, except for this it is very similar to Morpho eugenia and it has been placed as Morpho eugenia subspecies uraneis.

In 1913, Hans Fruhstorfer wrote: "M. uraneis Bates is an extraordinarily rare species; in addition to the type only three examples seem to be known, which were collected by Dr. Hahnel at Iquitos and Pebas. According to Staudinger uraneis has the upper surface blue with brilliant mother-of-pearl gloss and is larger and broader-winged. Its flight is more regular and not so rapid as that of adonis."
