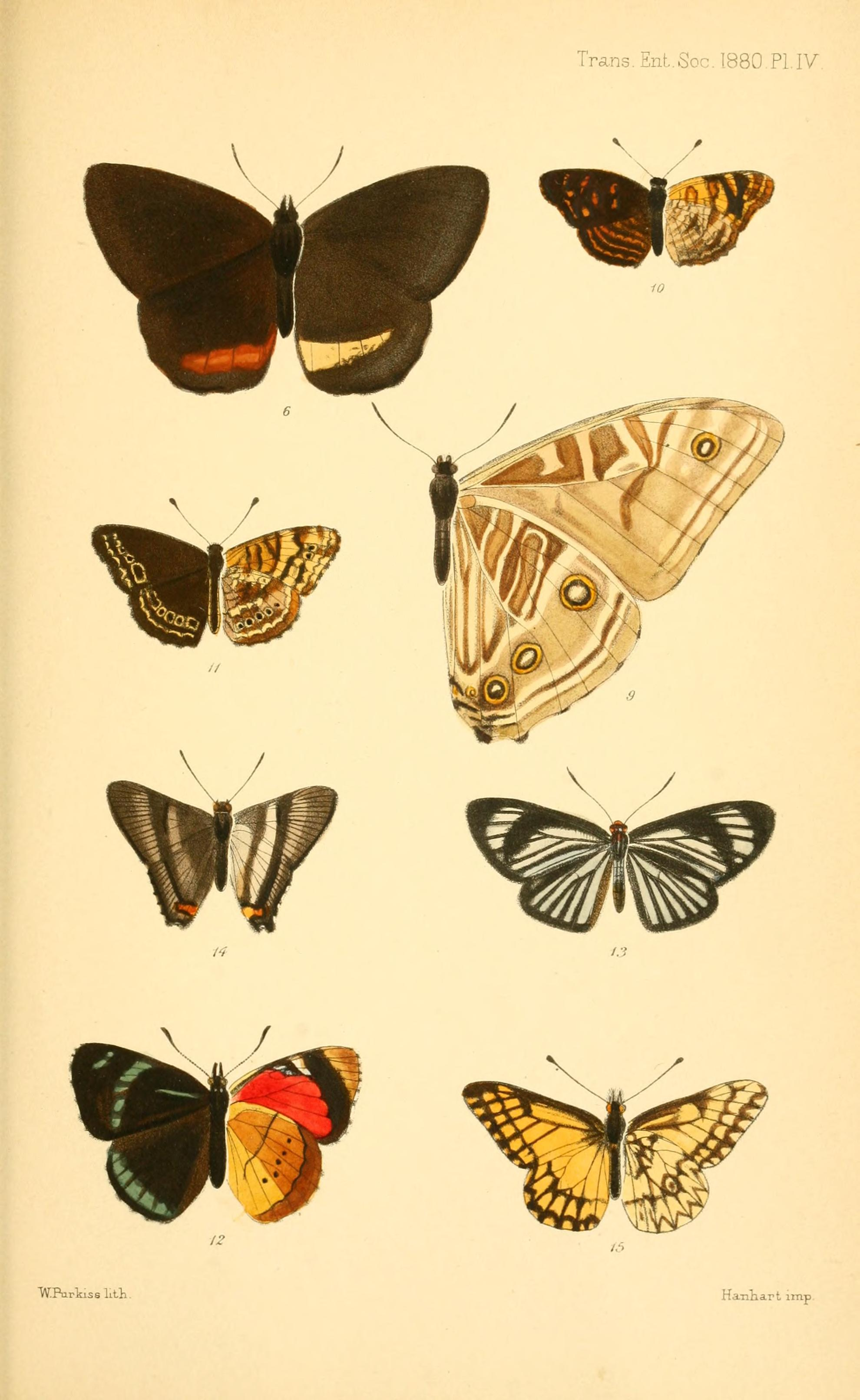
- Figure 9 (largest butterfly on plate, only one wing shown), underside, from the plate accompanying the original description

Scientific classification
- Kingdom: Animalia
- Phylum: Arthropoda
- Class: Insecta
- Order: Lepidoptera
- Family: Nymphalidae
- Genus: Morpho
- Species: M. rhodopteron

Binomial name
- Morpho rhodopteron Godman & Salvin, 1880

Synonyms
- Morpho rhodopteron var. nevadensis Krüger, 1925; Morpho (Cytheritis) schultzei Le Moult & Réal, 1962

= Morpho rhodopteron =

Species of butterfly

Morpho rhodopteron is a Neotropical butterfly known only from the Sierra Nevada de Santa Marta in Colombia.

With a wingspan of 7.5 cm (3 in). It is the smallest species in the genus Morpho.
