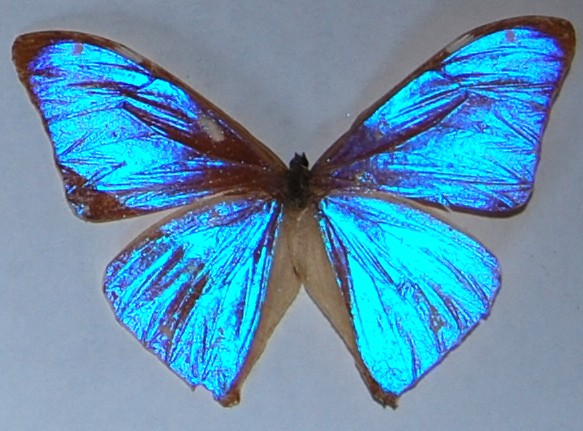
- Male

Scientific classification
- Kingdom: Animalia
- Phylum: Arthropoda
- Clade: Pancrustacea
- Class: Insecta
- Order: Lepidoptera
- Family: Nymphalidae
- Genus: Morpho
- Species: M. aega

Binomial name
- Morpho aega (Hübner, 1822)

= Morpho aega =

Aega morpho

Species of butterfly

Morpho aega, the Aega morpho, is a Neotropical butterfly found in Paraguay, Argentina and Brazil.

Morpho aega is a species group which may be composed of several species.

Many subspecies have been described.

Plate from Adalbert Seitz

== Description ==
M. aega, one of the best known and in the male one of the commonest Morphids, shows a tendency, within its relatively narrow range of distribution, to interesting geographical variation. The name-type, aega Hbn. (66 b), probably came from the state of Rio de Janeiro, although according to von Bonninghausen the species does not occur in the town of Rio itself, but only in the north-west of the province of this name, and is probably distributed as far as Sta. Catharina. The female was first figured by Staudinger; it differs from our figure (mellinia, 66 b) in the darker colouring, the smaller transcellular patches of the forewing and the far larger submarginal spots of the hindwing. — mellinia Fruhst. differs from females from Rio de Janeiro in the more extended black border of both wings and the much more broadly black thickening of the veins of the forewing. In addition on the forewing in the broader black spot at the apex of the cell and the larger yellow circumcellular patches. Lower median at its base, submedian in the middle, bordered with broad patches of black scales. The hindwing darker red-brown. Distal border more broadly black with the yellowish rounded patches considerably smaller. — bisanthe Fruhst. (66 b), with the type from Sta. Catharina, describes the southern form of the collective species, in the female recognizable at once by the almost uniformly large yellowish submarginal spots, which mostly extend from the anal angle to the apex, whilst in aega and mellinia they do not reach beyond the median part of the forewing. The circumcellular spots are larger and lighter. The black spot before the apex is narrower, more diffuse, and only extends to the middle of the anterior wall of the cell. The ground-colour of the yellow female much paler, on the hindwing without brown tinge; the submarginal patches of the forewing more uniform, forming a more complete row. The females are among the most variable Morphids and three principal forms may be distinguished, including the normal (most commonly occurring), predominantly brown-yellow female, analogous to that of mellinia, and probably the ancestral form, still recalling the Brassolids, thus phyletically the oldest. Besides this we have mixta Fruhst., with partial blue reflections on the forewing (66 b), and finally pseudocypris Fruhst. (66 c), in which the yellow-brown gives place to a dark or light blue, which overspreads the whole upper surface. Whilst the males before me from Rio de Janeiro, Parana and Blumenau show inter se no differences worth mentioning, the males of bisanthe from Rio Grande do Sul can be at once separated from their more northern representatives by the predominantly white-grey instead of purple-brown under surface, which in addition is traversed by more sharply defined, i.e. more strongly black-bordered and consequently more distinct, grey-white or pale yellow longitudinal bands. Also the bisanthe females are paler yellow beneath and in the form pseudocypris with more prominent light areas than in mellinia. Thus in the north Espírito Santo with an almost uniform hot, damp climate all the year round, which produces a continuous, vast forest area covering the still almost unknown interior of the province, has a deep-coloured, one might say rainy-season form. Rio Grande do Sul, on the contrary, with pronounced separation of the seasons and great extremes in temperature, produces, on account of the dry prairies extending from Argentina, which restrict the primeval forest to a relatively narrow tract in the eastern slopes of the coast-mountains, a pale race with all the characteristics of a product of a dry region. Mabilde says that bisanthe occurs for 10–15 days in the spring and 20–40 days in the autumn on forest-paths. Of the rare females about 10—15 are found to males Burmeister knew an aega race with blue females from the Missiones in the state of Argentina, discovered there by Carlos Berg

== Biology ==
The larvae feed on Gramineae (Arundo mitis, Bambusa, Bambusa trinii, Chusquea, Chusquea meyeriana, Merostachys claussenii)

== Etymology ==
Aega was a daughter of Helios and of such dazzling brightness that the Titans in their attack upon Olympus became frightened and requested their mother Gaia conceal her in the earth.
