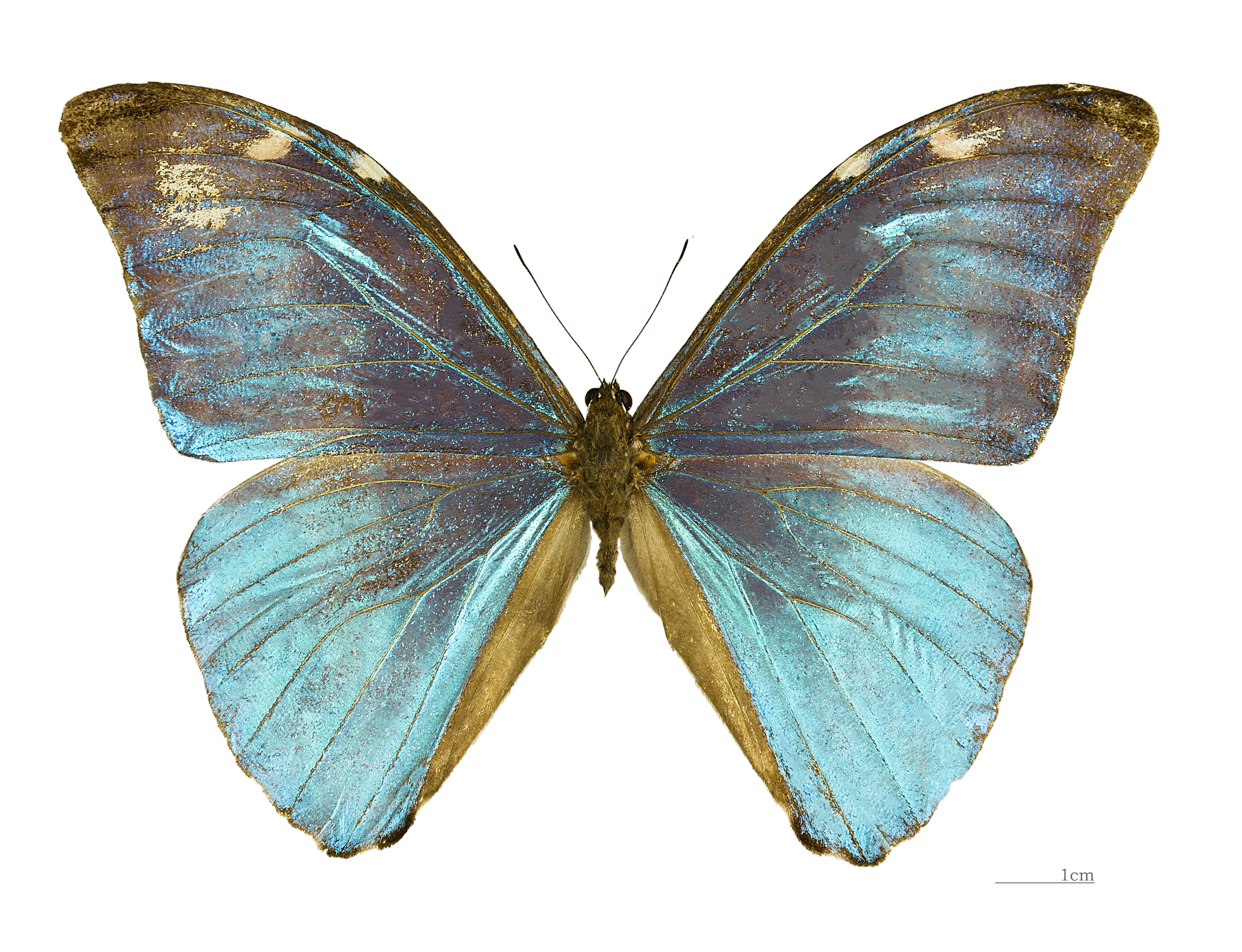
- Male - Muséum de Toulouse

Scientific classification
- Domain: Eukaryota
- Kingdom: Animalia
- Phylum: Arthropoda
- Class: Insecta
- Order: Lepidoptera
- Family: Nymphalidae
- Genus: Morpho
- Species: M. eugenia

Binomial name
- Morpho eugenia Deyrolle, 1860

= Morpho eugenia =

Eugene morpho

Species of butterfly

Morpho eugenia, the Eugene morpho, is a Neotropical butterfly found in French Guiana.

The name honours Empress Eugénie, the empress consort, as the wife of Napoleon III.

The male resembles the generally known Morpho aega, but the blue is duller and lighter. Forewing also above with the two white costal spots and with less black at the apex.

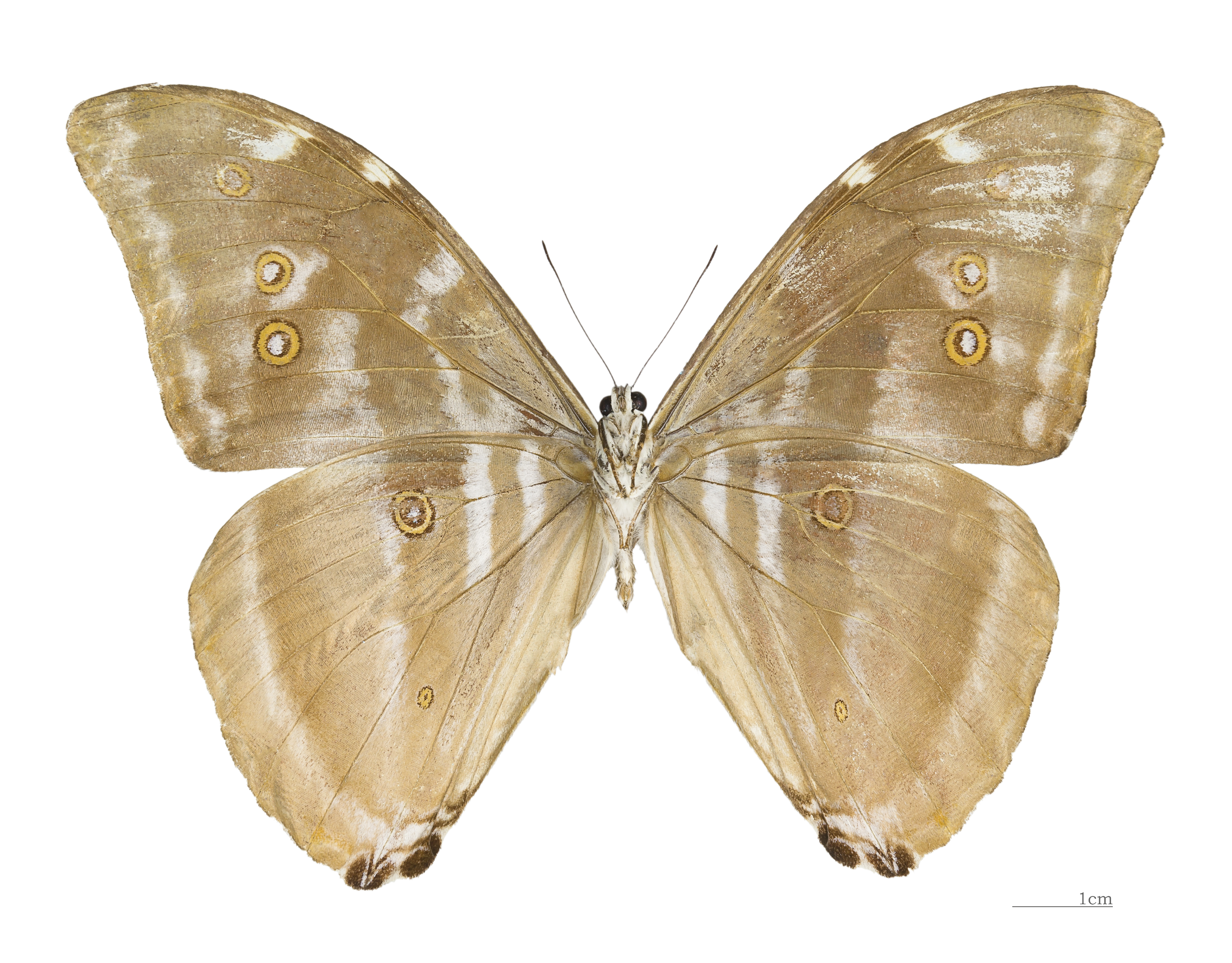
Male underside

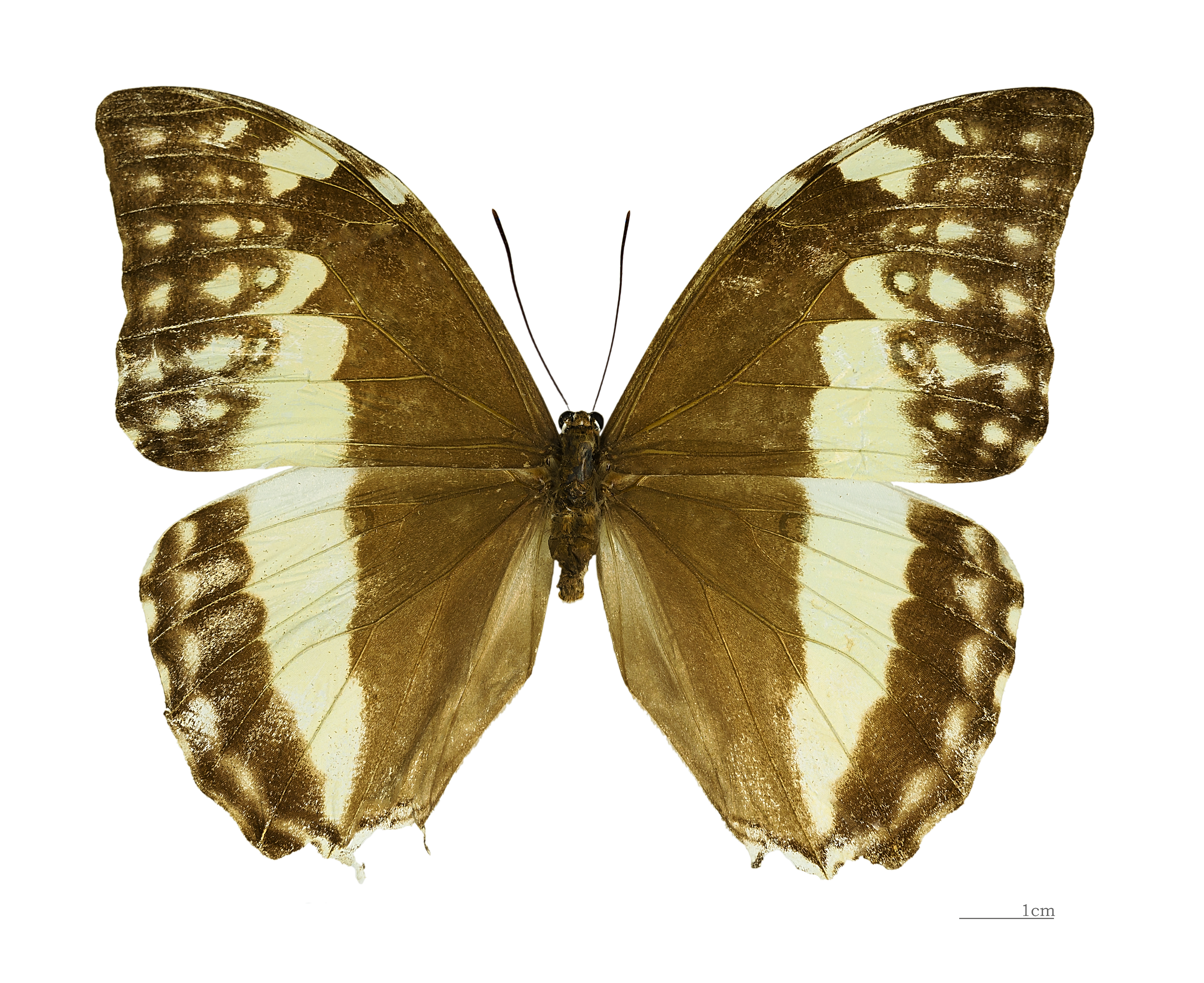
Female

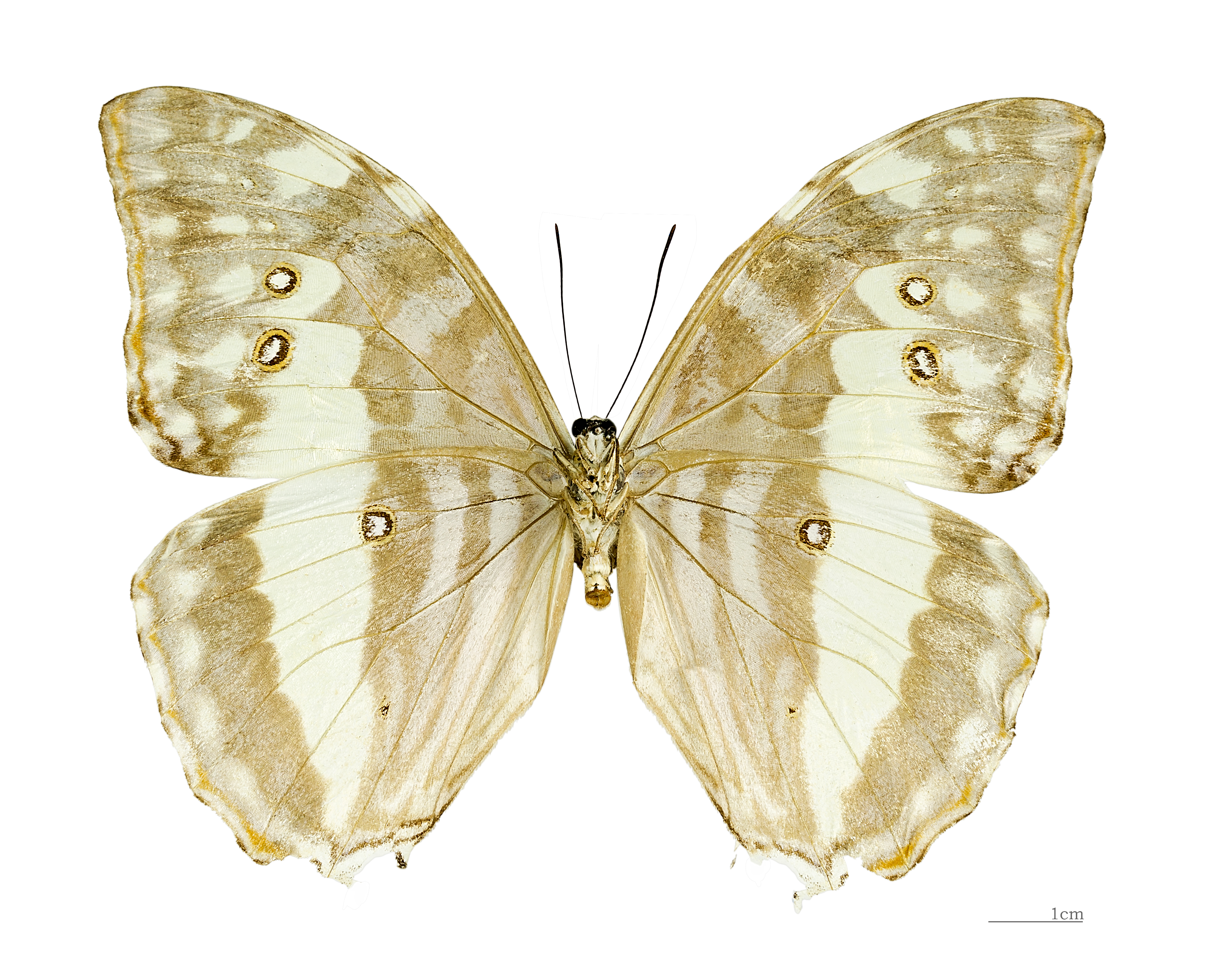
Female underside
