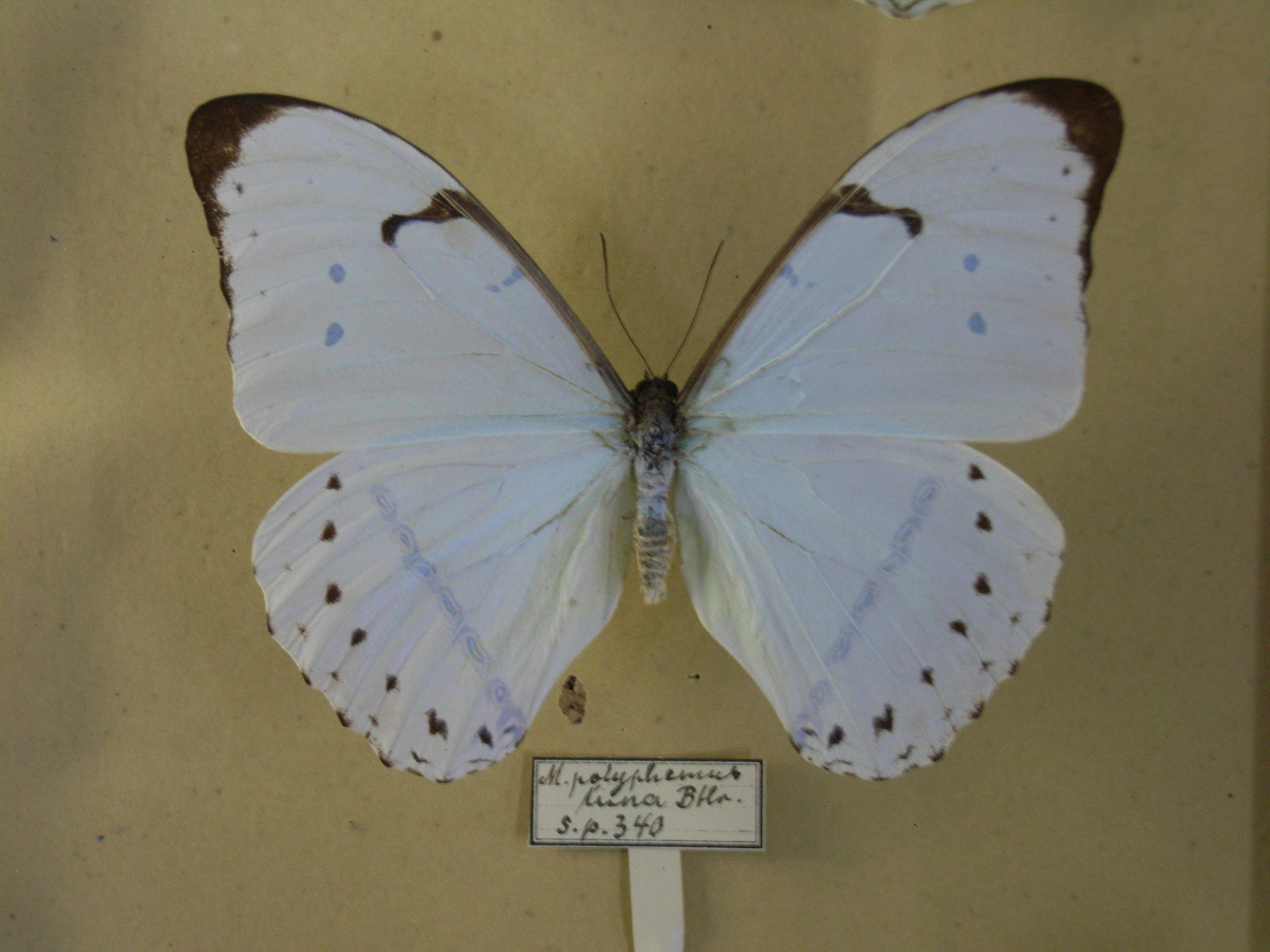
- Museum Wiesbaden

Scientific classification
- Kingdom: Animalia
- Phylum: Arthropoda
- Clade: Pancrustacea
- Class: Insecta
- Order: Lepidoptera
- Family: Nymphalidae
- Genus: Morpho
- Species: M. luna

Binomial name
- Morpho luna Butler, 1869

Synonyms
- Morpho thoosa Smyth, 1903; Morpho (Pessonia) luna niveina Le Moult & Réal, 1962; Morpho (Pessonia) luna niveina f. albina Le Moult & Réal, 1962; Morpho (Pessonia) luna luna f. subtuscolorata Le Moult & Réal, 1962

= Morpho luna =

Species of butterfly

Morpho luna is a Neotropical butterfly.

== Description ==
Morpho athena is a large white butterfly.

== Distribution ==
This species is present in Mexico, Honduras and Guatemala.

== Taxonomy ==
Morpho luna may be a subspecies of Morpho polyphemus and be called Morpho polyphemus luna.
