= Morpho laertes =

Scientific classification
- Kingdom: Animalia
- Phylum: Arthropoda
- Clade: Pancrustacea
- Class: Insecta
- Order: Lepidoptera
- Family: Nymphalidae
- Genus: Morpho
- Species: M. laertes

Binomial name
- Morpho laertes (Drury, 1782)

Synonyms
- Papilio laertes Drury, 1782; Papilio epistrophus Fabricius, 1796; Morpho catenarius Perry, 1811; Morpho eristrophis Hübner, 1816/1824; Morpho laertes eutropius Fruhstorfer, 1912; Morpho laertes nikolajewna Weber, 1951

Species of butterfly

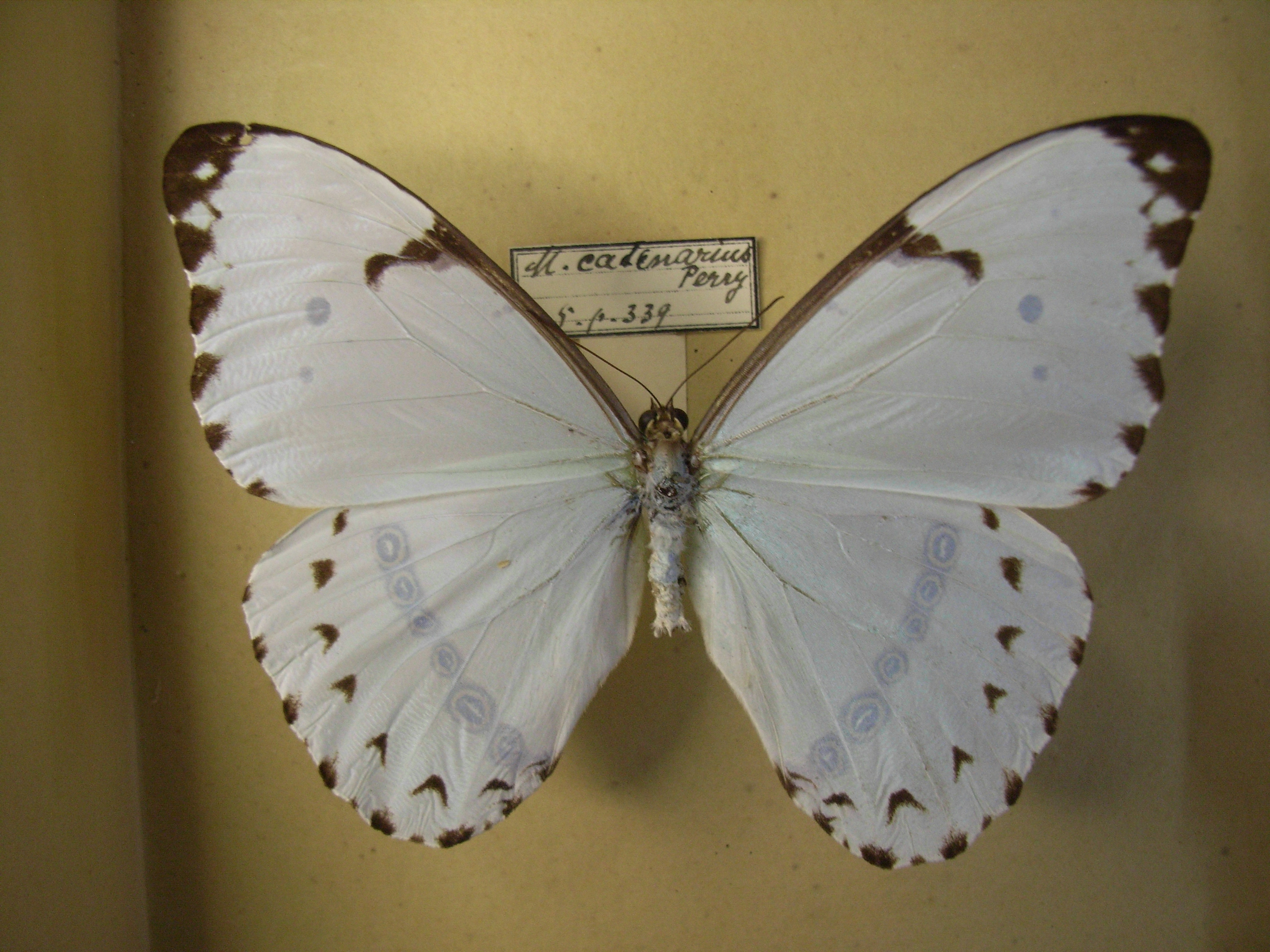
Morpho epistrophus catenaria

Morpho laertes (formerly Morpho epistrophus), the white morpho or epistrophus white morpho, is a Neotropical butterfly found in Brazil, Uruguay, Paraguay, and Argentina. The white morpho is native to the Atlantic Forest, where they are distributed throughout a landscape of multiple species.

== Description ==
[[File:Seitz5FaunaAmericanaPlate068 - Morpho.jpg|thumb|225px|Plate from Seitz showing undersides of M. laertes and subspecies argentinus]] In 1913, Hans Fruhstorfer wrote in Die Gross-Schmetterlinge der Erde:

Group Morpho F. (= Leonte Hbn.). Species with metallic gloss on the upper surface; upper discocellular short, middle strongly convex proximally, lower concave distally, in the obtuse angle directed towards the anterior median. Cell of the forewing considerably widened towards the apex. Uncus and its lateral clasps relatively slender, valve distally spined.

Morpho laertes is the best known of a small group of species that differ from all their allies by its chalky, milky, or silvery white ground-colour. M. laertes may be easily distinguished by the connected chain of narrow, oblong, ocellated median spots on the underside of the hindwing, which have mostly only indistinct white pupils and washed-out yellowish bordering. The bluish white colouring is brought out very well in the figure. The upper surface resembles the figured underside, except that the forewing continues narrowly margined with black to about the middle of the median area. Hindwing with some elongate black anteterminal and more distinct submarginal patches. M. laertes only inhabits the provinces of Rio de Janeiro and Espírito Santo and is very common both at Rio and Petropolis from January to March. Larvae nest on various forest-trees. It was first described by Burmeister. Arrangement of the bristles according to Dr. Wilhelm Müller are like Morpho hercules.

== Taxonomy ==
When first described in 1782 laertes was placed in the genus Papilio. The specimen was from Brasília. It is a valid name in The Global Lepidoptera Names Index.

Currently it is placed in the subgenus Pessonia (Le Moult & Réal 1962) of genus Morpho, along with the closely related species Morpho catenarius (Perry, 1811), Morpho luna (Butler), Morpho polyphemus (Dixey), and Morpho titei (Drury, 1770). It is now considered a junior synonym of Morpho laertes.

== Etymology ==
The name comes from Laërtes, a figure in Greek mythology. Epistrophus is a character in the Iliad.

== Subspecies ==
Subspecies in alphabetical order:

- Morpho epistrophus argentinus H. Fruhstorfer, 1907
- Morpho epistrophus catenaria Perry, 1811
- Morpho epistrophus epistrophus (J.C. Fabricius, 1796) = Morpho laertes Drury 1782
- Morpho epistrophus titei E. Le Moult & P. Réal, 1962

== Bibliography ==
- Blandin, P. 2007. The genus Morpho, Lepidoptera Nymphalidae. Part 3. The Subgenera Pessonia, Grasseia and Morpho and Addenda to Parts 1 & 2. Hillside Books, Canterbury
- Le Moult (E.) & Réal (P.) (1962–1963). "Les Morpho d'Amérique du Sud et Centrale." Editions du cabinet entomologique. E. Le Moult, Paris.
