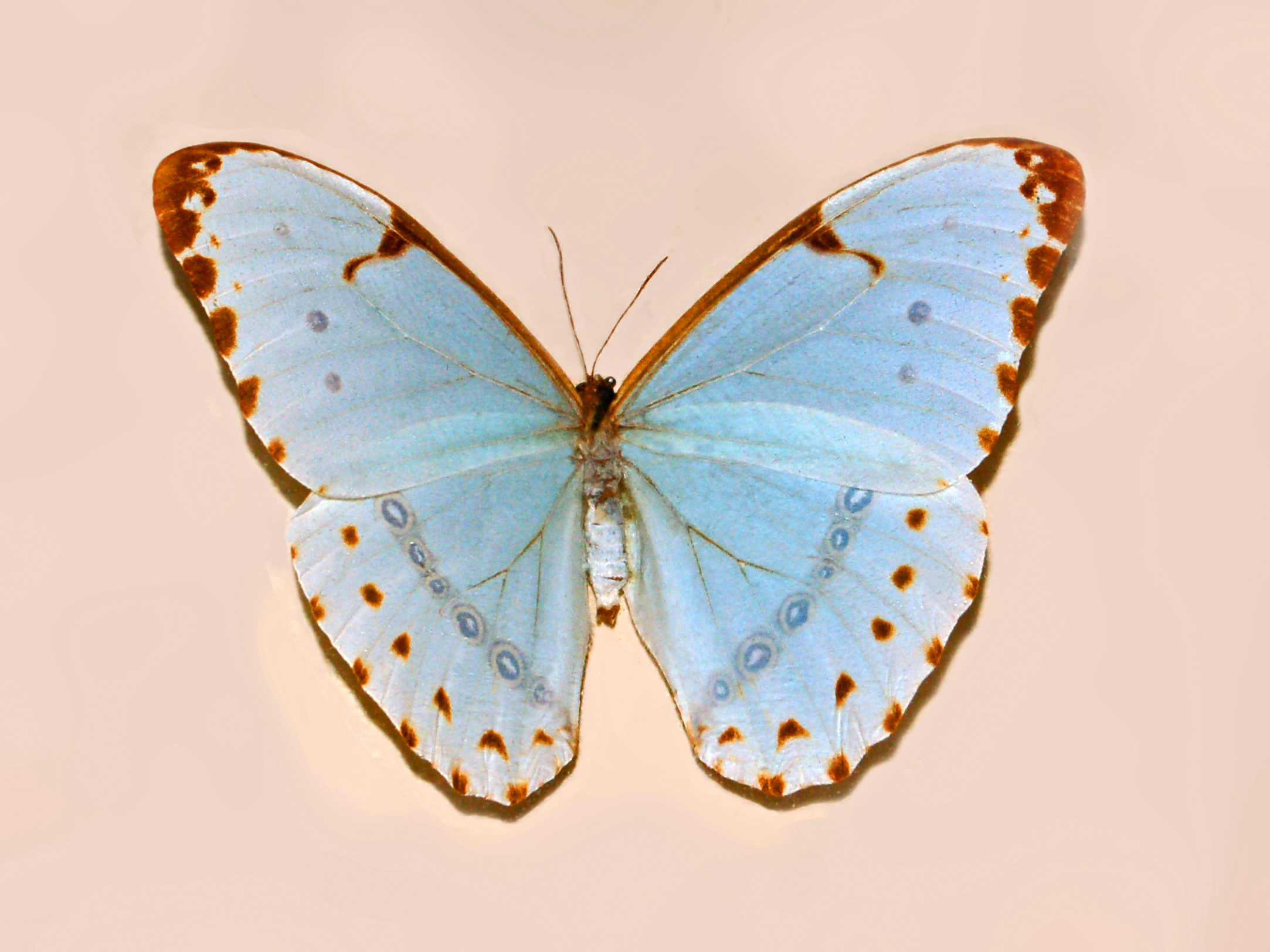
- From Brazil

Scientific classification
- Domain: Eukaryota
- Kingdom: Animalia
- Phylum: Arthropoda
- Class: Insecta
- Order: Lepidoptera
- Family: Nymphalidae
- Genus: Morpho
- Species: M. catenarius

Binomial name
- Morpho catenarius Perry, 1811

Synonyms
- Papilio catenaria Perry, 1811; Morpho catenaria; Morpho (Pessonia) laertes f. avicularia Le Moult & Réal, 1962; Morpho (Pessonia) laertes sachtlebeni Le Moult & Réal, 1962; Morpho (Pessonia) catenaria catenaria f. elataria Le Moult & Réal, 1962; Morpho (Pessonia) catenaria eutroparia Le Moult & Réal, 1962

= Morpho catenarius =

Species of butterfly

Morpho catenarius is a Neotropical butterfly belonging to the subfamily Morphinae of the family Nymphalidae. It is considered, by some authors, to be a subspecies of Morpho epistrophus.

== Description ==
Morpho catenarius has a wingspan of about 75–100 millimetres (3.0–3.9 in). This species lacks the usual bright blue coloration of many Morpho species. The translucent surfaces of the wings vary from a pale blue color to almost white. The edges of the wings show a series of black spots, while the hindwings are crossed by several small "eyes". Larvae feed on Scutia buxifolia (Rhamnaceae) and other plant species in the families Erythroxylaceae, Leguminosae, Sapindaceae and Euphorbiaceae.

== Distribution ==
This species is found in Brazil (Minas Gerais, São Paulo).
