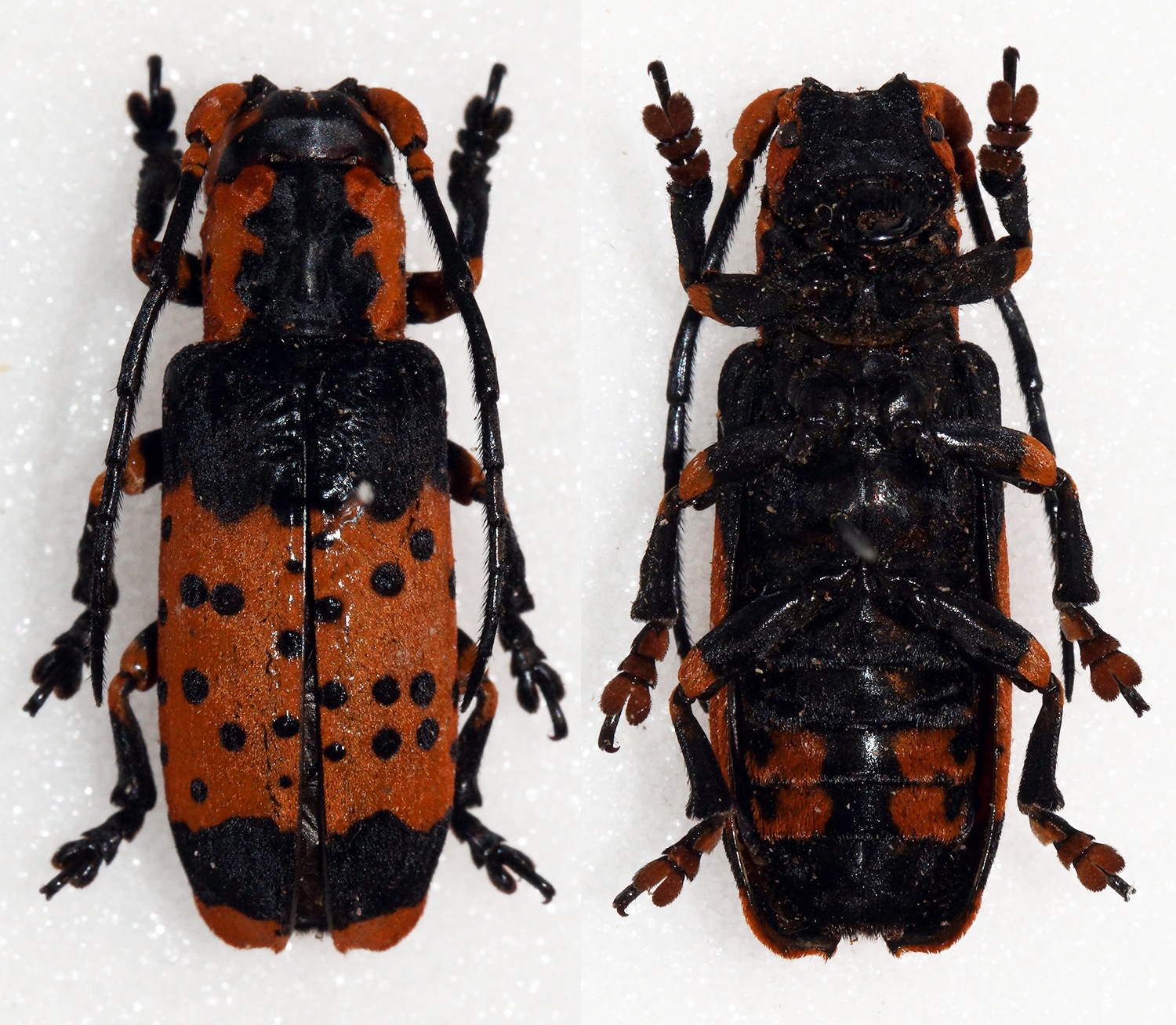

Scientific classification
- Kingdom: Animalia
- Phylum: Arthropoda
- Class: Insecta
- Order: Coleoptera
- Family: Cerambycidae
- Genus: Sthenias
- Species: S. varius

Binomial name
- Sthenias varius (Olivier, 1792)

Synonyms
- Lamia varia Olivier, 1792; Cerambyx crocatus Olivier, 1795; Thysanodes jucundus Newman, 1842

= Sthenias varius =

Species of beetle

Sthenias varius is a species of beetle in the family Cerambycidae. It was described by Guillaume-Antoine Olivier in 1792, originally under the genus Lamia. It is known from Philippines.
