= Sthenias poleti =

Scientific classification
- Domain: Eukaryota
- Kingdom: Animalia
- Phylum: Arthropoda
- Class: Insecta
- Order: Coleoptera
- Suborder: Polyphaga
- Infraorder: Cucujiformia
- Family: Cerambycidae
- Subfamily: Lamiinae
- Tribe: Pteropliini
- Genus: Sthenias
- Species: S. poleti

Binomial name
- Sthenias poleti Le Moult, 1938

Species of beetle

Sthenias poleti is a species of beetle in the family Cerambycidae. It was described by Eugène Le Moult in 1938. It is known from Gabon and the Democratic Republic of the Congo.
