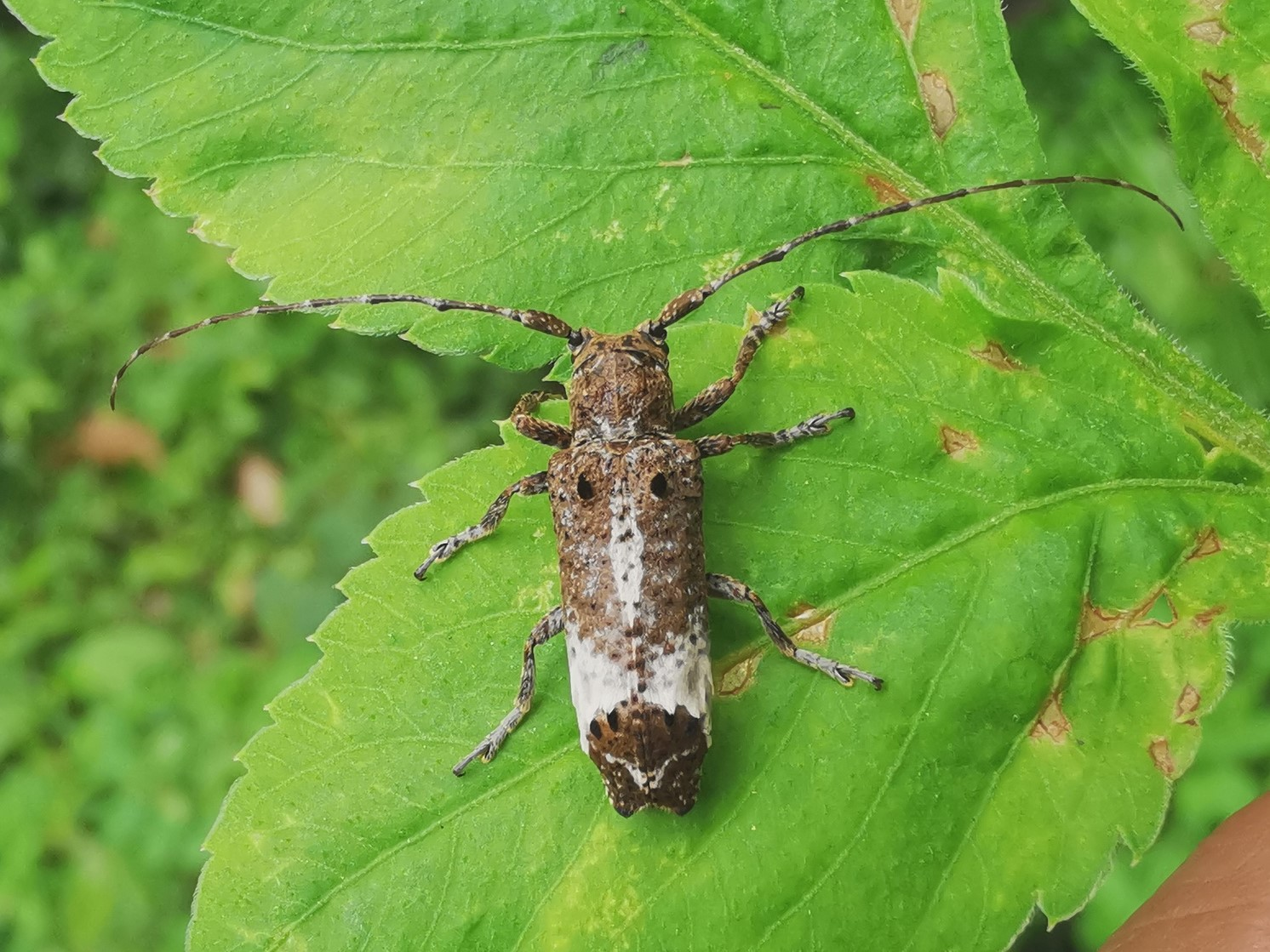

Scientific classification
- Kingdom: Animalia
- Phylum: Arthropoda
- Class: Insecta
- Order: Coleoptera
- Suborder: Polyphaga
- Infraorder: Cucujiformia
- Family: Cerambycidae
- Subfamily: Lamiinae
- Tribe: Pteropliini
- Genus: Sthenias
- Species: S. pseudodorsalis

Binomial name
- Sthenias pseudodorsalis Breuning, 1938

= Sthenias pseudodorsalis =

Species of beetle

Sthenias pseudodorsalis is a species of beetle in the family Cerambycidae. It was first described by Stephan von Breuning in 1938. It is known from India, Nepal, Bhutan, and Laos.
