= Georges Bernardi =

French entomologist (1922–1999)

Georges Bernardi (1922–1999) was a French entomologist, reading and speaking Russian, French and English. He was the only French representative to participate at the elaboration of the International Code of Zoological Nomenclature.

== Works ==
=== With Le Moult ===
When working at Eugène Le Moult's shop he wrote some important works in the journal Miscellanea Entomologica:

- 1944. Révision des Aporia du groupe d'Agathon, Miscellanea Entomologica, 41, pp. 69–77, 1 plate.
- 1947. Nomenclature de formes européennes de l'Euchloe ausonia, Miscellanea Entomologica, 44, pp. 1–24.
- 1947. Révision de la classification des espèces holarctiques des genres Pieris et Pontia, Miscellanea Entomologica, 44, pp. 65–80, 5 plates.
- 1947. La nomenclature de deux Limenitis européens, Miscellanea Entomologica, 44, pp. 81–86.

=== At the Paris Museum ===
More important works were:

- 1954. Révision des Pierinae de la faune malgache, 137 pages
- 1985. Le polymorphisme et le mimétisme de Papilio dardanus Brown, 50 pages, 3 plates (1 in colours), Bulletin de la société entomologique de France, 90, pp. 1106–1155 (with J. Pierre and T. H. Ngyuen).

As a director of thesis, he supervised the works of J. Plantrou on Charaxes and of Nguyen Thi Hong on the Apatura.
