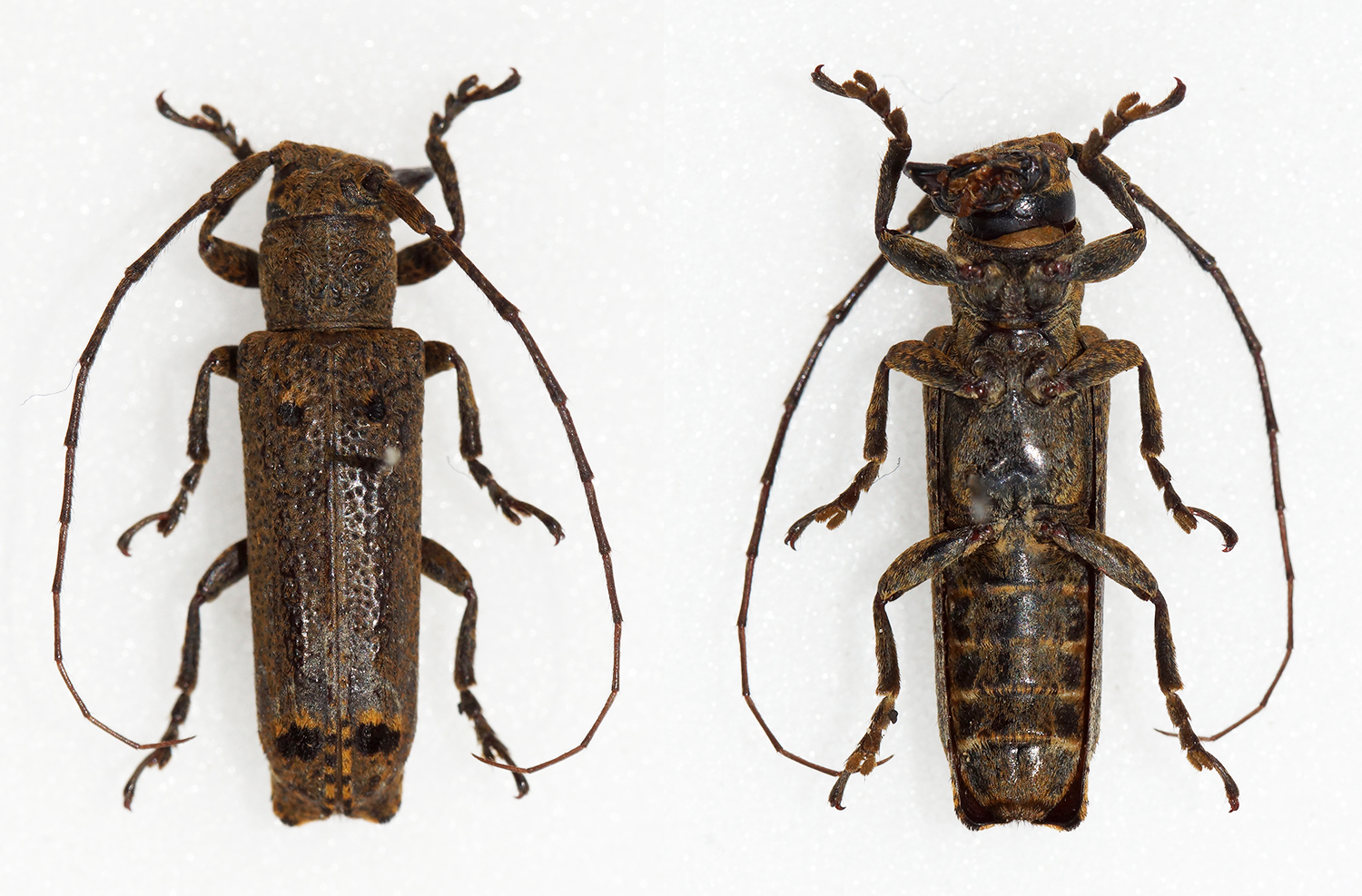

Scientific classification
- Kingdom: Animalia
- Phylum: Arthropoda
- Class: Insecta
- Order: Coleoptera
- Suborder: Polyphaga
- Infraorder: Cucujiformia
- Family: Cerambycidae
- Subfamily: Lamiinae
- Tribe: Pteropliini
- Genus: Sthenias
- Species: S. yunnanus

Binomial name
- Sthenias yunnanus Breuning, 1938

= Sthenias yunnanus =

Species of beetle

Sthenias yunnanus is a species of beetle in the family Cerambycidae. It was described by Stephan von Breuning in 1938. It is known from China.
