= Miscellanea Entomologica =

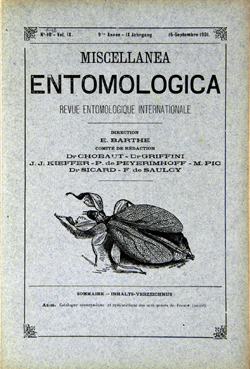
- Discipline: Entomology
- Language: French

Publication details
- History: 1892-1988
- Publisher: Eugène Barthe (France)
- Frequency: monthly

Standard abbreviations
- ISO 4: Misc. Entomol.

Indexing
- ISSN: 0750-7933
- OCLC no.: 13652156

Miscellanea Entomologica was a French entomological scientific journal. It was originally published by Eugène Barthe and established in 1892.

== Beginning ==
The first issue of Miscellanea Entomologica was published in a larger format (24 x 36cm), but immediately the following ones were smaller (18 x 24cm). The first year was published both in French and in German. The first issues consisted mainly of capture notes and announcements for the sale or exchange of insects.

== History ==
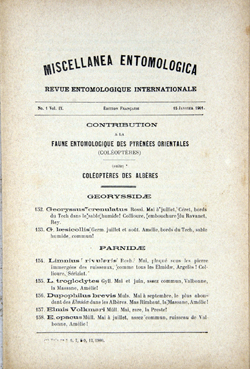
First page of the periodical

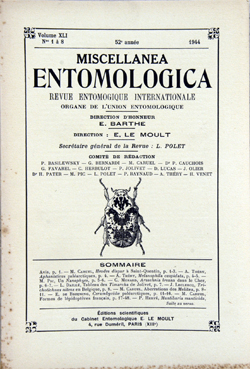
Miscellanea Entomologica, Le Moult publisher

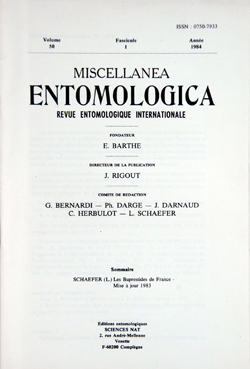
Miscellanea Entomologica, Sciences nat publisher

There were 3 different publishers:

=== Eugène Barthe (1892-1940) ===
When Barthe started Miscellanea Entomologica, he was 30. He had a great deal of difficulty finding enough subscribers to pay the costs of production and expedition- but 30 years later the publication was one of the most important in Europe. The main works published were on Coleoptera. The field of study was insects of France, the Rhine Valley with Switzerland, Belgium and the Netherlands. The publication included the magazine and many supplements published as irregular leaflets of 8 or 16 pages. A list of everything that appeared was compiled by G. Bernardi and O. Fabre (published as Le Moult & Bernardi). Later, another list was produced to help recognize leaflets published by Miscellanea Entomologica.

=== Eugène Le Moult (1943-1956) ===
In 1943, Le Moult continued the publication with the development of numerous articles on Lepidoptera. Thus were published many works by Georges Bernardi and Marcel Caruel, while Breuning published works on European Lamiinae. The last volume published by Le Moult was #48 in 1956.

=== Sciences Nat (1982-1988) ===
In 1982 Sciences Nat restarted the journal and published volumes 49 to 51. The publication committee was composed of eminent entomologists: Georges Bernardi, Philippe Darge, Jean Darnaud, Claude Herbulot and Léon Schaefer. Colour plates were included in each volume. The circulation was about 300 copies.

== Supplements ==
Barthe published under his own name one of the best books on European Coleoptera under the title "Faune Franco-Rhénane", which covers several families. Other authors wrote on the same subject: M. des Gozis, Dr. Auzat, H. du Buysson (Elateridae). Le Moult published the big book by Léon Schaefer on the Buprestidae of France and his work on Apatura.

== See also ==
Over a period of 97 years 51 volumes were published
