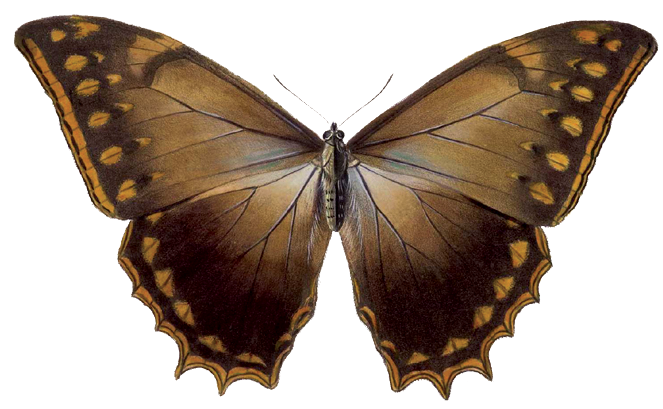
- Subspecies justitia Godman and Salvin from Biologia Centrali-Americanum (1879–1915)

Scientific classification
- Kingdom: Animalia
- Phylum: Arthropoda
- Clade: Pancrustacea
- Class: Insecta
- Order: Lepidoptera
- Family: Nymphalidae
- Genus: Morpho
- Species: M. theseus

Binomial name
- Morpho theseus (Deyrolle, 1860)

= Morpho theseus =

Theseus morpho

Species of butterfly

Morpho theseus, the Theseus morpho, is a Neotropical butterfly. It is found in Panama, Costa Rica, Mexico, Colombia, Peru, Ecuador, Venezuela, Honduras and Guatemala.

== Description ==
In 1913, Hans Fruhstorfer wrote: "Morpho theseus apparently replaces hercules in Central America and the Andean region. It is less constant than hercules, inclining to geographical and probably also to climatic variation, has somewhat narrower wings than hercules and is distinguished from all other Morphids by the long, pointed teeth of the hindwing." Note: Morpho amphitryon, which was considered a race of Morpho theseus by Fruhstorfer, also has the "pointed teeth" or scalloping.

Ground colour brown inclining to olive green, base only quite faintly suffused with whitish. Cell black brown at the extremity and with an inconspicuous whitish spot before the apex. Forewing with only two distinct rows of yellowish patches.

== Subspecies ==
Many subspecies have been described including

- Morpho theseus theseus Columbia
- Morpho theseus aquarius Butler, 1872 Butler, 1872 Costa Rica and Columbia.
- Morpho theseus juturna Butler, 1870 Columbia, Ecuador and northern Peru
- Morpho theseus justitiae Salvin & Godman, 1868 Costa Rica, Honduras and Guatemala
- Morpho theseus oaxacensis Le Moult & Réal, 1962 Mexico
- Morpho theseus pacificus Krüger, 1925 Columbia and Ecuador
- Morpho theseus perlmani Venezuela
- Morpho theseus schweizeri (Maza, 1987) Mexico.
- Morpho theseus triangulifera Le Moult & Réal, 1962 Ecuador
- Morpho theseus yaritanus Fruhstorfer, 1913 Venezuela

== Etymology ==
Theseus was a legendary king of Athens.

== Gallery ==
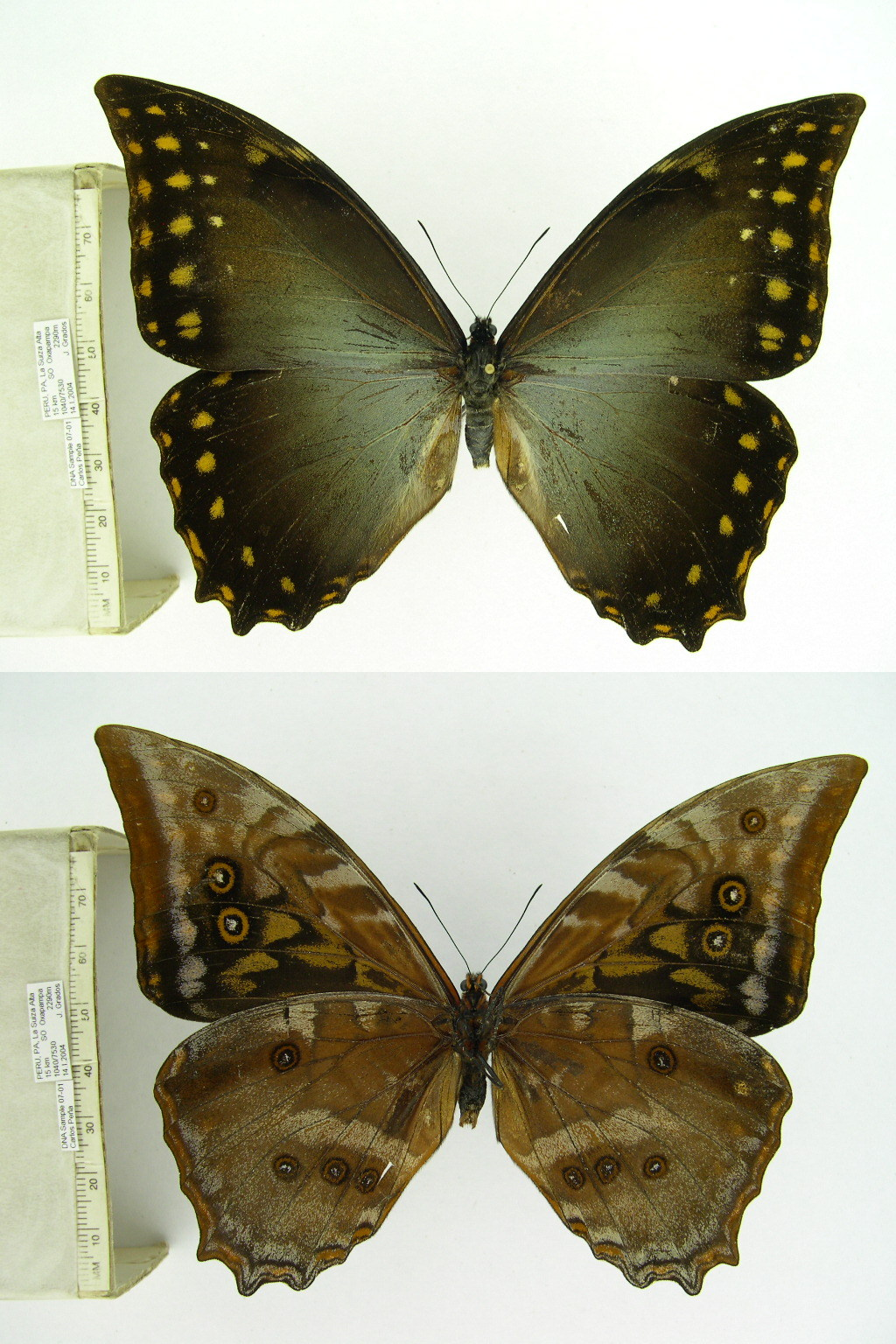
both sides

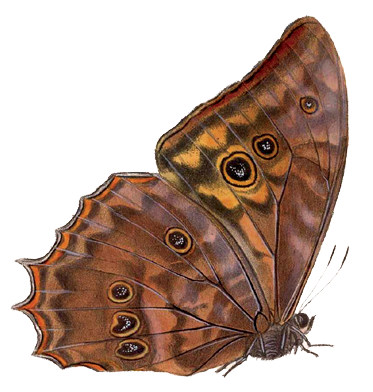
underside

plate from Seitz Die Gross-Schmetterlinge der Erde

== Related Species (Species Group) ==
- Morpho telemachus
