= Sthenias partealbicollis =

Scientific classification
- Kingdom: Animalia
- Phylum: Arthropoda
- Class: Insecta
- Order: Coleoptera
- Suborder: Polyphaga
- Infraorder: Cucujiformia
- Family: Cerambycidae
- Subfamily: Lamiinae
- Tribe: Pteropliini
- Genus: Sthenias
- Species: S. partealbicollis

Binomial name
- Sthenias partealbicollis Breuning, 1968

Synonyms
- Sthenias (Albosthenias) partealbicollis Breuning, 1968

Species of beetle

Sthenias partealbicollis is a species of beetle in the family Cerambycidae. It was described by Stephan von Breuning in 1968.
