= Epistrophus =

Epistrophus may refer to:

- Epistrophus (Greek mythology), any of several legendary characters
- Epistrophus (weevil), a weevil genus in the tribe Hylobiini
- Epistrophus white morpho (Morpho epistrophus), a butterfly of South America
