= Sthenias borneanus =

Scientific classification
- Kingdom: Animalia
- Phylum: Arthropoda
- Class: Insecta
- Order: Coleoptera
- Suborder: Polyphaga
- Infraorder: Cucujiformia
- Family: Cerambycidae
- Subfamily: Lamiinae
- Tribe: Pteropliini
- Genus: Sthenias
- Species: S. borneanus

Binomial name
- Sthenias borneanus Breuning, 1982

Species of beetle

Sthenias borneanus is a species of beetle in the family Cerambycidae. It was described by Stephan von Breuning in 1982. It is known from Borneo.
