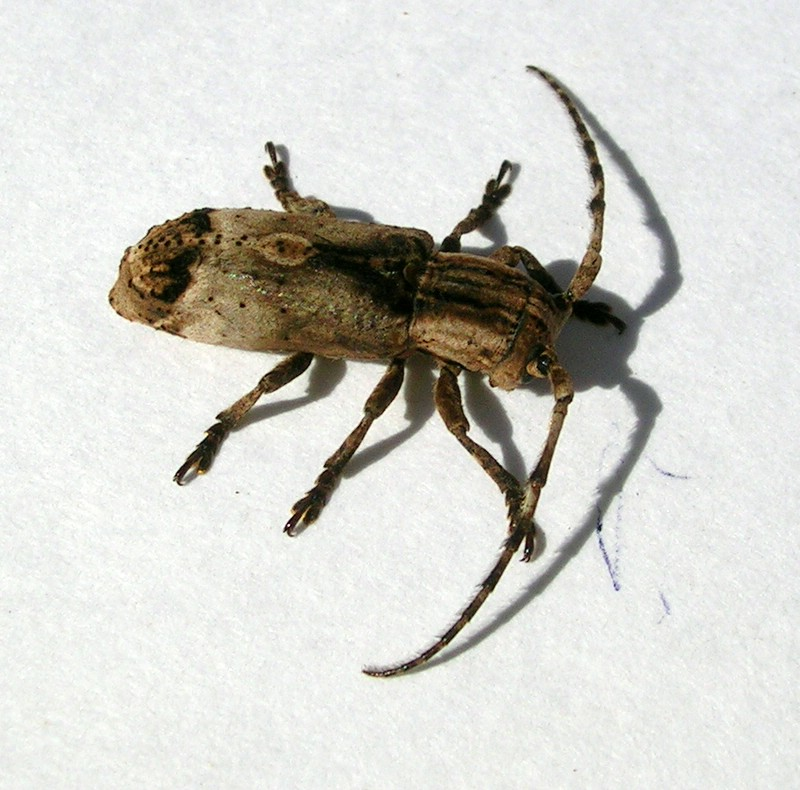

Scientific classification
- Kingdom: Animalia
- Phylum: Arthropoda
- Clade: Pancrustacea
- Class: Insecta
- Order: Coleoptera
- Suborder: Polyphaga
- Infraorder: Cucujiformia
- Family: Cerambycidae
- Genus: Sthenias
- Species: S. grisator

Binomial name
- Sthenias grisator ( Fabricius, 1787)

Synonyms
- Lamia grisator Fabricius, 1787

= Sthenias grisator =

Species of beetle

Sthenias grisator is a species of beetle in the family Cerambycidae. It was described by Johan Christian Fabricius in 1787, originally under the genus Lamia. It is known from India. It feeds on Erythrina variegata, Manihot utilissima, Morus alba, Tabernaemontana alba and Vitis vinifera.
