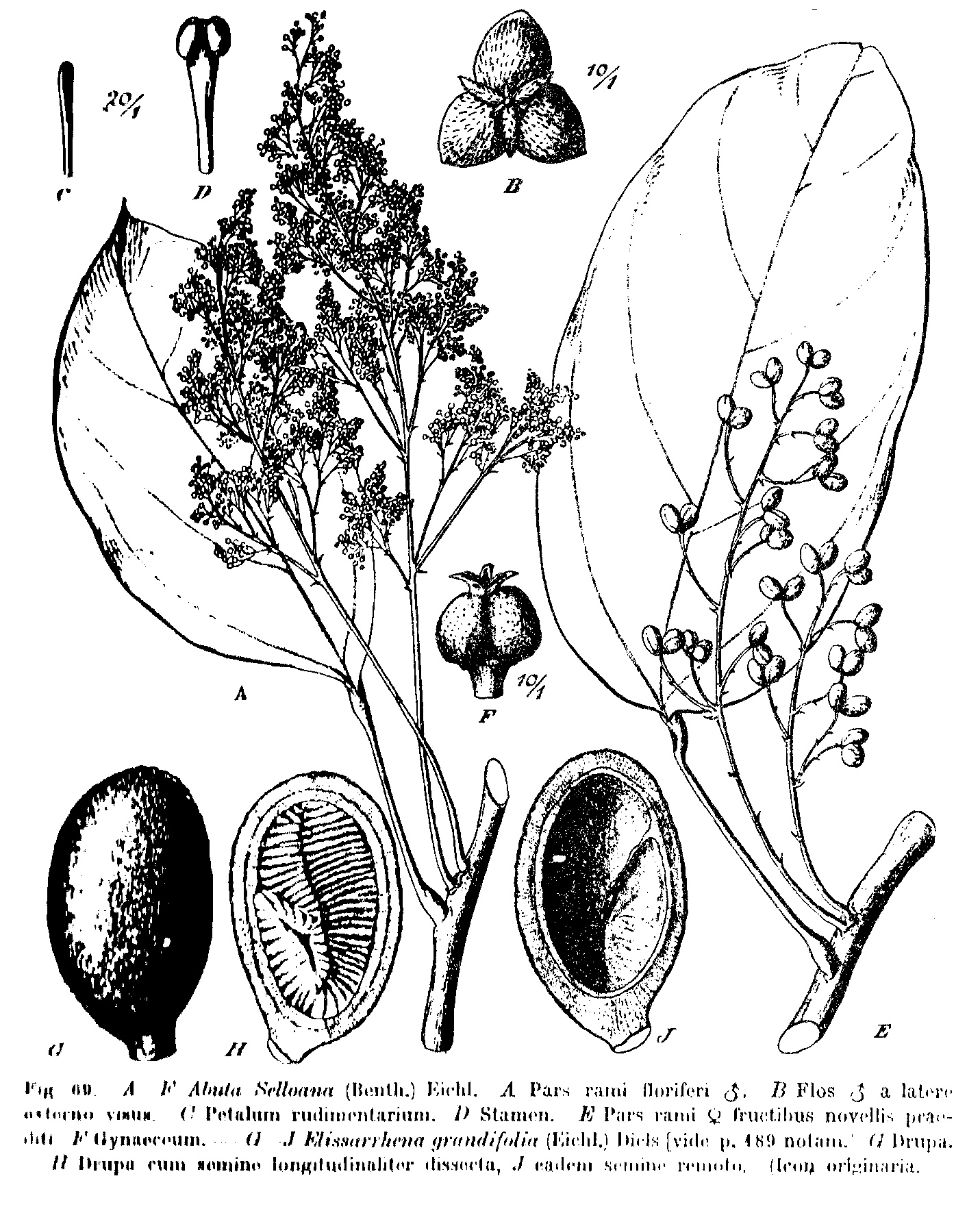
- Illustration

Scientific classification
- Kingdom: Plantae
- Clade: Embryophytes
- Clade: Tracheophytes
- Clade: Spermatophytes
- Clade: Angiosperms
- Clade: Eudicots
- Order: Ranunculales
- Family: Menispermaceae
- Genus: Abuta
- Species: A. selloana

Binomial name
- Abuta selloana Eichler

Synonyms
- Cissampelos ovata Vell.

= Abuta selloana =

Species of flowering plant

Abuta selloana is a species of flowering plant in the family Menispermaceae. It is a perennial vine.

The species is native to Brazil, and is eaten by parrots and capuchin monkeys. It was first described in 1864.

== Distribution ==
The species is native to the wet tropical biome of Brazil. It is present at elevations of up to 600 metres (2,000 ft).

== Ecology ==
Abuta selloana is eaten by birds, including the cobalt-rumped parrotlet, the scaly-headed parrot, and the plain parakeet. It is also eaten by two species of capuchin (the black capuchin and the tufted capuchin).

It hosts the butterfly species Morpho richardus and Morpho hercules.

== Nomenclature ==
The name Abuta selloana was first published by August W. Eichler, in 1864. In Portuguese, the species is known as uva-do-mato or cipó-bala.
