= Sthenias madurae =

Scientific classification
- Domain: Eukaryota
- Kingdom: Animalia
- Phylum: Arthropoda
- Class: Insecta
- Order: Coleoptera
- Suborder: Polyphaga
- Infraorder: Cucujiformia
- Family: Cerambycidae
- Subfamily: Lamiinae
- Tribe: Pteropliini
- Genus: Sthenias
- Species: S. madurae

Binomial name
- Sthenias madurae Boppe, 1914

Species of beetle

Sthenias madurae is a species of beetle in the family Cerambycidae. It was described by Boppe in 1914. It is known from India.
