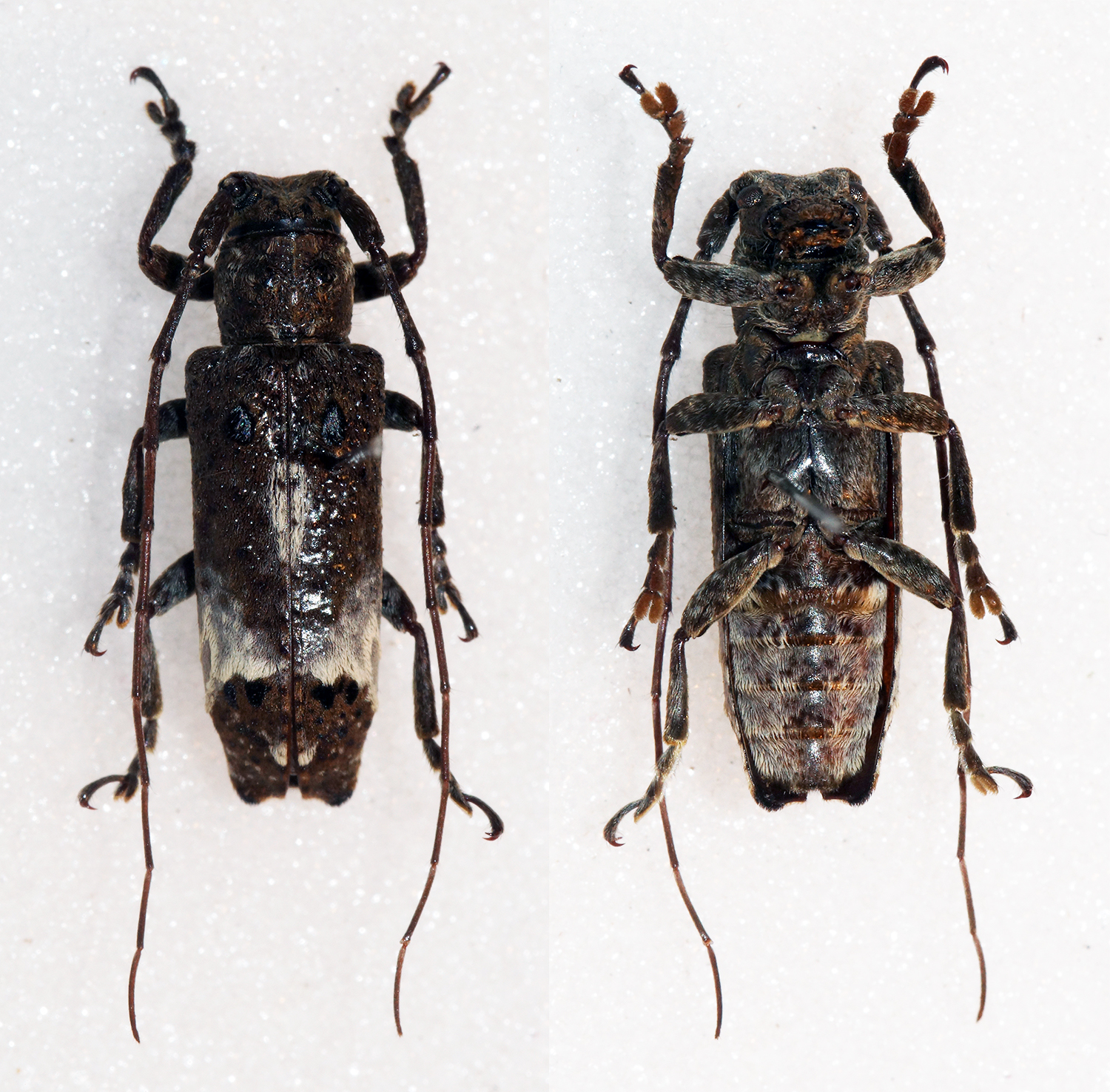

Scientific classification
- Kingdom: Animalia
- Phylum: Arthropoda
- Class: Insecta
- Order: Coleoptera
- Suborder: Polyphaga
- Infraorder: Cucujiformia
- Family: Cerambycidae
- Subfamily: Lamiinae
- Tribe: Pteropliini
- Genus: Sthenias
- Species: S. gahani

Binomial name
- Sthenias gahani (Pic, 1912)

Synonyms
- Anaches gahani Pic, 1912

= Sthenias gahani =

Species of beetle

Sthenias gahani is a species of beetle in the family Cerambycidae. It was described by Maurice Pic in 1912. It is known from China.
