= Morpho amphitryon =

Scientific classification
- Kingdom: Animalia
- Phylum: Arthropoda
- Class: Insecta
- Order: Lepidoptera
- Family: Nymphalidae
- Genus: Morpho
- Species: M. amphitryon

Binomial name
- Morpho amphitryon Staudinger, 1887

Synonyms
- Morpho (Iphimedeia) theseus amphitrion f. azurita Fruhstorfer, 1913; Morpho hercules antaeus Röber, 1927; Morpho (Iphimedeia) amphitrion amphitrion f. persion Le Moult & Réal, 1962; Morpho amphitryon duponti Duchêne, 1985; Iphimedeia amphitryon susarion Fruhstorfer, 1913; Morpho amphitrion cinereus f. malva Duchêne, 1985; Morpho amphitrion cinereus f. blandini Duchêne, 1985

Species of butterfly

Morpho amphitryon is a Neotropical butterfly.

== Description ==
Morpho amphitryon is a very large butterfly with a wingspan of 150–160 mm. The top of the wings is a blue grey metallic colour with a wide grey border embellished by a submarginal row of white spots. The outer edge of the forewing is concave and the hindwings have a scalloped edge. "amphitrion Stgr. [as race of Morpho theseus], from Chanchamayo, South Peru, has the forewing much elongated, with the cell blue-grey. Males also occur with the upper surface suffused with blue-white throughout."

== Habitat ==
Morpho amphitryon lives in Andean montane forests at altitudes from 700 to 2000 metres above sea level.

== Status ==
Morpho amphitryon is a "scarce" or rare species.

== Subspecies ==
- M. a. amphitryon (Peru)
- M. a. azurita Duchêne et Blandin, 2009
- M. a. susarion Fruhstorfer, 1913 (Bolivia)
- M. a. cinereus Duchêne, 1985 (Peru)

== Distribution ==
This species is present in Bolivia and Peru. The northernmost population is in the mountain chain which forms the border between the Amazonas and San Martín departments. It is a Tropical Andes species.

== Related Species (Species Group) ==
- Morpho hercules
- Morpho richardus
