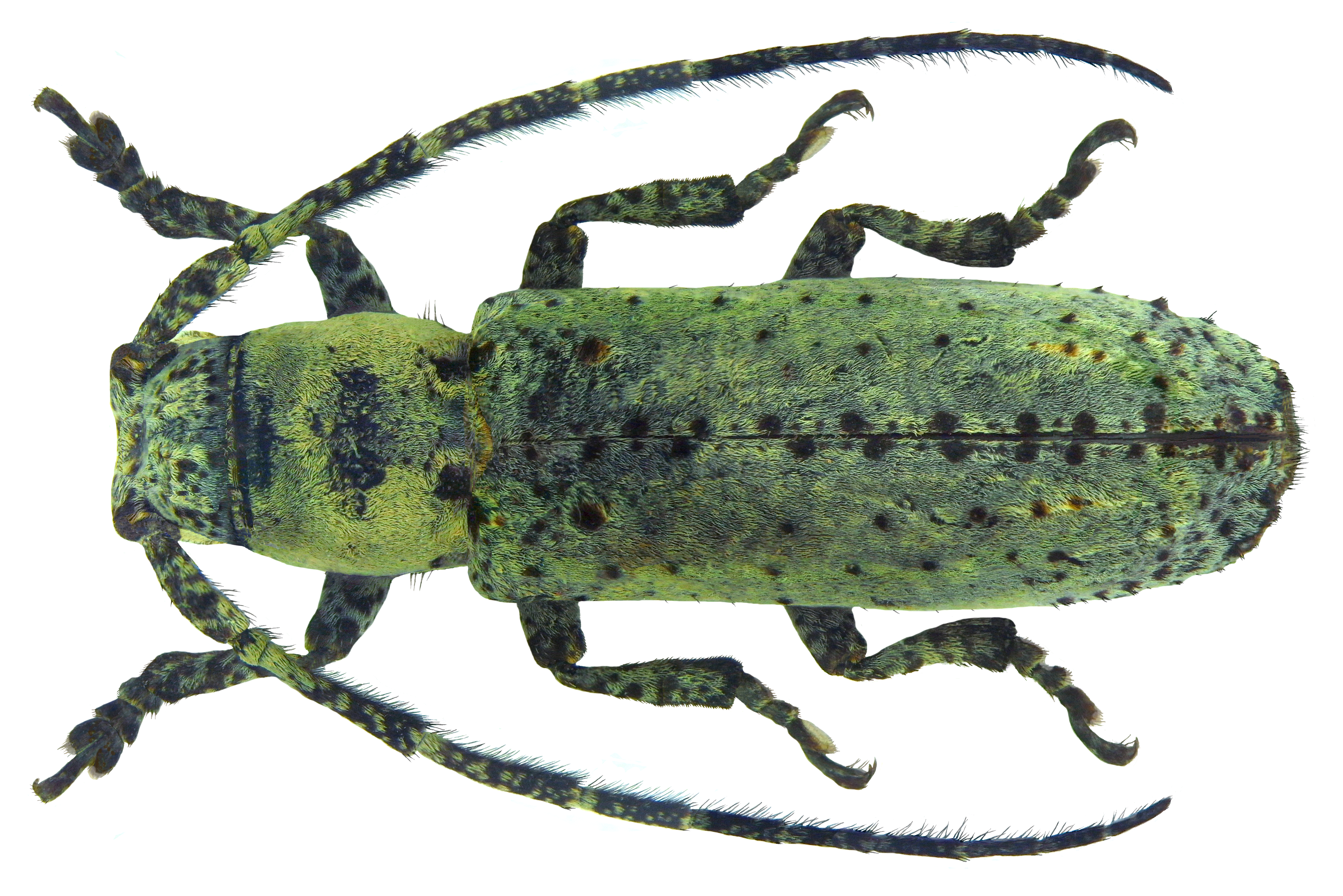

Scientific classification
- Domain: Eukaryota
- Kingdom: Animalia
- Phylum: Arthropoda
- Class: Insecta
- Order: Coleoptera
- Suborder: Polyphaga
- Infraorder: Cucujiformia
- Family: Cerambycidae
- Subfamily: Lamiinae
- Tribe: Pteropliini
- Genus: Sthenias
- Species: S. damarensis

Binomial name
- Sthenias damarensis Adlbauer, 2011

Synonyms
- Sthenias cylindrator var. deleticia Breuning & Teocchi, 1982

= Sthenias damarensis =

Species of beetle

Sthenias damarensis is a species of beetle in the family Cerambycidae. It was described by Adlbauer in 2011. It is known from Namibia.
