= Sthenias franciscanus =

Scientific classification
- Kingdom: Animalia
- Phylum: Arthropoda
- Clade: Pancrustacea
- Class: Insecta
- Order: Coleoptera
- Suborder: Polyphaga
- Infraorder: Cucujiformia
- Family: Cerambycidae
- Subfamily: Lamiinae
- Tribe: Pteropliini
- Genus: Sthenias
- Species: S. franciscanus

Binomial name
- Sthenias franciscanus J. Thomson, 1865

Synonyms
- Sthenias franciscana Thomson, 1865 (misspelling)

Species of beetle

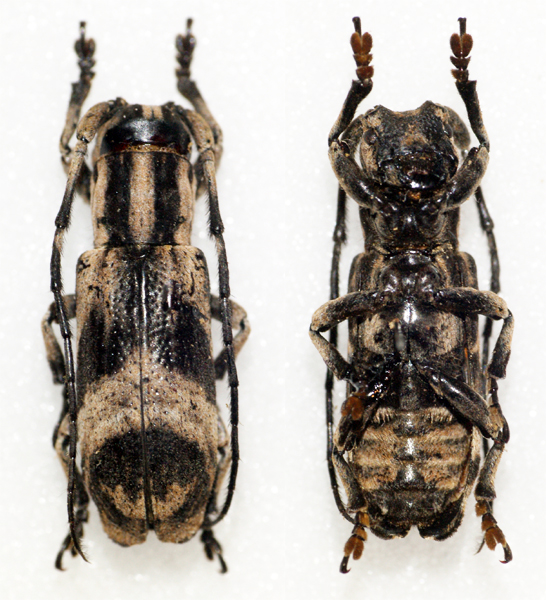

Sthenias franciscanus is a species of beetle in the family Cerambycidae. It was described by James Thomson in 1865, originally spelled as "Sthenias franciscana". It is known from Laos, Malaysia, China, Borneo and Sumatra.
