= Sthenias maculiceps =

Scientific classification
- Domain: Eukaryota
- Kingdom: Animalia
- Phylum: Arthropoda
- Class: Insecta
- Order: Coleoptera
- Suborder: Polyphaga
- Infraorder: Cucujiformia
- Family: Cerambycidae
- Subfamily: Lamiinae
- Tribe: Pteropliini
- Genus: Sthenias
- Species: S. maculiceps

Binomial name
- Sthenias maculiceps Gahan, 1890

Species of beetle

Sthenias maculiceps is a species of beetle in the family Cerambycidae. It was described by Charles Joseph Gahan in 1890. It is known from Sri Lanka and India.
