= Sthenias angustatus =

Scientific classification
- Kingdom: Animalia
- Phylum: Arthropoda
- Class: Insecta
- Order: Coleoptera
- Suborder: Polyphaga
- Infraorder: Cucujiformia
- Family: Cerambycidae
- Subfamily: Lamiinae
- Tribe: Pteropliini
- Genus: Sthenias
- Species: S. angustatus

Binomial name
- Sthenias angustatus Pic, 1925

Synonyms
- Sthenias angustata Pic, 1925 (misspelling)

Species of beetle

Sthenias angustatus is a species of beetle, part of the family Cerambycidae. It was discovered and described by Maurice Pic in 1925.
