= Morpho richardus =

Richard's morpho
- Centre butterfly, top row, among others from Morpho. Plate from Adalbert Seitz.

Scientific classification
- Kingdom: Animalia
- Phylum: Arthropoda
- Clade: Pancrustacea
- Class: Insecta
- Order: Lepidoptera
- Family: Nymphalidae
- Genus: Morpho
- Species: M. richardus

Binomial name
- Morpho richardus Fruhstorfer, 1898

Species of butterfly

Morpho richardus, or Richard's morpho, is a Neotropical butterfly found only in Minas Gerais, Brazil.

== Description ==
Male indefinite greenish, female of yellowish bronze green. Both above and beneath like a small M. hercules. Forewing with three rows of submarginal yellow dots. The patch before the apex of the cell broadly dull gold yellow, with scattered black scales. Discal area of the forewing yellowish. Distal margin rather narrow, brown black, base of both wings light green. Under surface: forewing with four small, elongate ocelli of about uniform size, with narrow black irises. Proximally to the ocelli there are three very large, triangular grey-yellow median spots. Underside of the hindwing predominantly red brown with violet sheen. Median band grey violet. Length of the forewing 58 mm.

== Biology ==
The larva feeds on Abuta selloana.

== Related Species (Species Group) ==
- Morpho amphitryon
- Morpho hercules
