= Sthenias tonkineus =

Scientific classification
- Kingdom: Animalia
- Phylum: Arthropoda
- Class: Insecta
- Order: Coleoptera
- Suborder: Polyphaga
- Infraorder: Cucujiformia
- Family: Cerambycidae
- Subfamily: Lamiinae
- Tribe: Pteropliini
- Genus: Sthenias
- Species: S. tonkineus

Binomial name
- Sthenias tonkineus Pic, 1925

Synonyms
- Sthenias tonkinea Pic, 1925 (misspelling)

Species of beetle

Sthenias tonkineus is a species of beetle in the family Cerambycidae. It was described by Maurice Pic in 1925. It is known from Vietnam.
