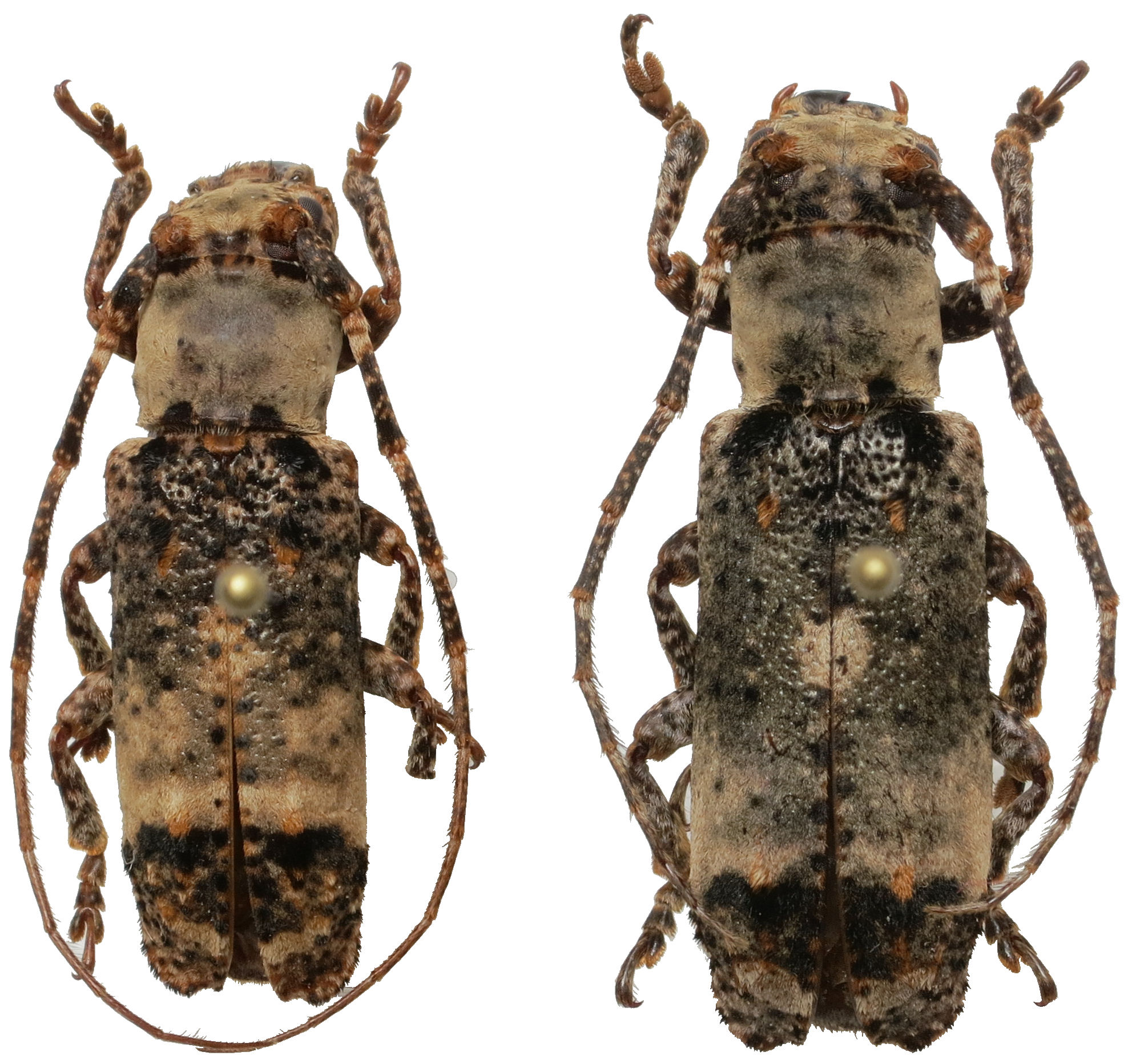
- In Togo

Scientific classification
- Domain: Eukaryota
- Kingdom: Animalia
- Phylum: Arthropoda
- Class: Insecta
- Order: Coleoptera
- Suborder: Polyphaga
- Infraorder: Cucujiformia
- Family: Cerambycidae
- Subfamily: Lamiinae
- Tribe: Pteropliini
- Genus: Sthenias
- Species: S. cylindrator

Binomial name
- Sthenias cylindrator ( Fabricius, 1801)

Synonyms
- Lamia cylindrator Fabricius, 1801; Sthenias verticalis Chevrolat, 1857; Sthenias mioni Guerin, 1840; Chalarus leucaspis Fahraeus, 1872

= Sthenias cylindrator =

Species of beetle

Sthenias cylindrator is a species of beetle in the family Cerambycidae. It was described by Johan Christian Fabricius in 1801. It has a wide distribution throughout Africa. It feeds on Coffea canephora and Nerium oleander.

== Subspecies ==
- Sthenias cylindrator cylindrator (Fabricius, 1801)
- Sthenias cylindrator ater Téocchi, 1997
