= Sthenias gracilicornis =

Scientific classification
- Domain: Eukaryota
- Kingdom: Animalia
- Phylum: Arthropoda
- Class: Insecta
- Order: Coleoptera
- Suborder: Polyphaga
- Infraorder: Cucujiformia
- Family: Cerambycidae
- Subfamily: Lamiinae
- Tribe: Pteropliini
- Genus: Sthenias
- Species: S. gracilicornis

Binomial name
- Sthenias gracilicornis Gressitt, 1937

Species of beetle

Sthenias gracilicornis is a species of beetle in the family Cerambycidae. It was described by Gressitt in 1937.
