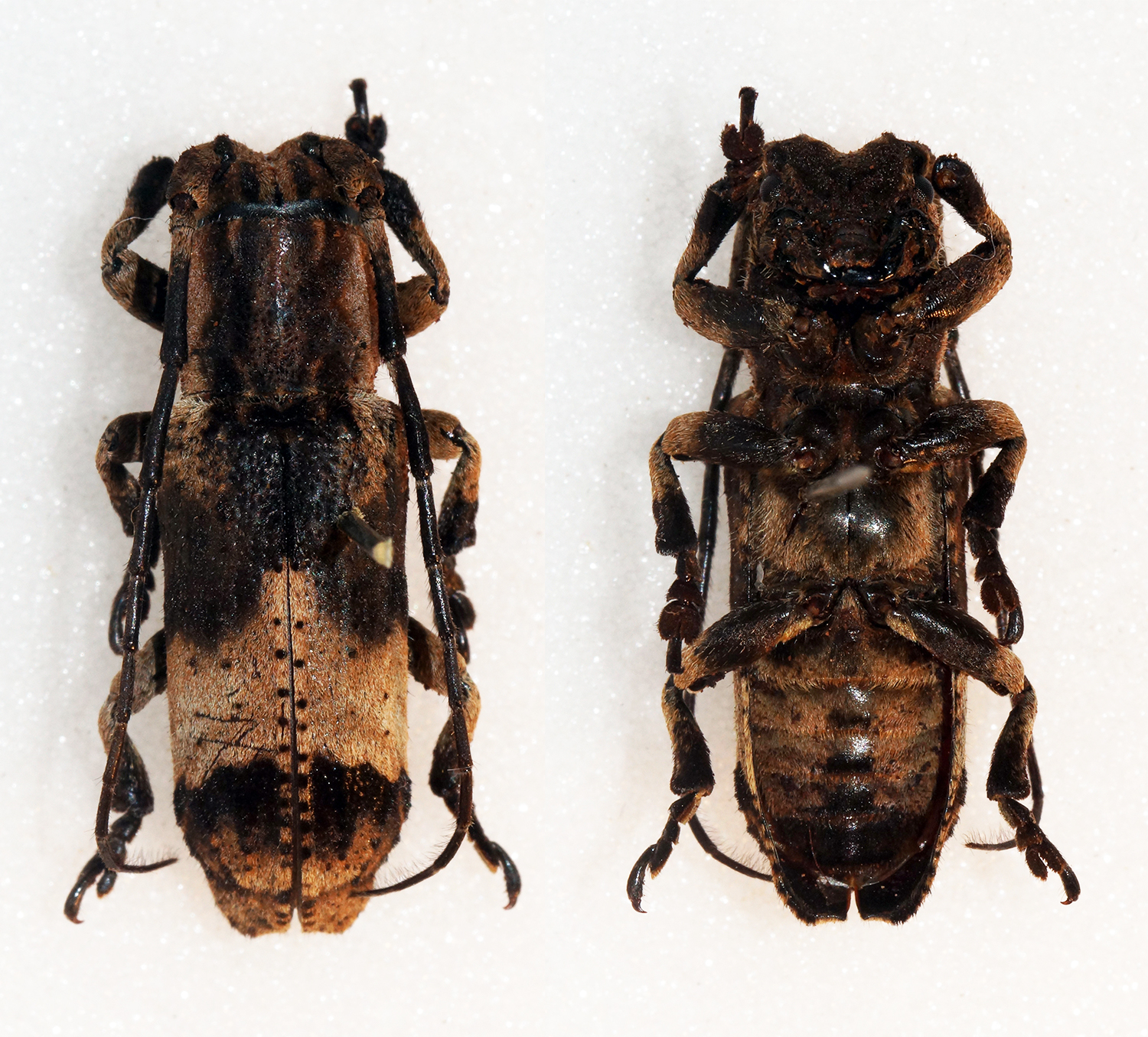

Scientific classification
- Domain: Eukaryota
- Kingdom: Animalia
- Phylum: Arthropoda
- Class: Insecta
- Order: Coleoptera
- Suborder: Polyphaga
- Infraorder: Cucujiformia
- Family: Cerambycidae
- Subfamily: Lamiinae
- Tribe: Pteropliini
- Genus: Sthenias
- Species: S. pascoei

Binomial name
- Sthenias pascoei Ritsema, 1888

Synonyms
- Sthenias grisator (Fabricius, 1787) (misidentification)

= Sthenias pascoei =

Species of beetle

Sthenias pascoei is a species of beetle in the family Cerambycidae. It was described by Coenraad Ritsema in 1888. It is known from Sumatra and Malaysia.
