= Pierre Réal =

French entomologist

Pierre Réal (1922 – 13 December 2009) was a French entomologist. He specialised in Lepidoptera.

He was a professor at the Faculty of Besançon.

== Works ==
His best known work is the book he wrote with Le Moult on the genus Morpho, published as a supplement to the journal Novitates Entomologicae.

A list of 29 of his works is given by J. C. Robert.

== Genera and species he described ==
1953

- Anoplocnephasia
- Brachycnephasia
- Cnephasia alternella interjunctana
- Cnephasia alternella parvana
- Cnephasia alternella peyerimhoffi
- Cnephasia alternella pseudochrysantheana
- Cnephasia alternella rectilinea
- Cnephasia alternella siennicolor
- Cnephasia alternella vulgaris
- Cnephasia alticola decaryi
- Cnephasia alticola juncta
- Cnephasia bizensis
- Cnephasia canescana griseana
- Cnephasia canescana grisescana
- Cnephasia canescana montserrati
- Cnephasia canescana venansoni
- Cnephasia communana caprionica
- Cnephasia communana lucia
- Cnephasia communana pseudorthoxyana
- Cnephasia communana seminigra
- Cnephasia conspersana albicans
- Cnephasia conspersana gallicana
- Cnephasia conspersana pseudoalternella
- Cnephasia cottiana buvati
- Cnephasia cottiana pyrenaea
- Cnephasia incanana infuscata
- Cnephasia interjecta mediocris
- Cnephasia joannisis dumonti
- Cnephasia legrandi
- Cnephasia longana minor
- Cnephasia obsoletana algerana
- Cnephasia osseana alpicola
- Cnephasia osseana alpicolana
- Cnephasia osseana borreoni
- Cnephasia osseana pratana
- Cnephasia osseana pseudolongana
- Cnephasia osseana solfatarana
- Cnephasia pascuana pseudocommuana
- Cnephasia penziana alpestris
- Cnephasia penziana clarana
- Cnephasia penziana livonica
- Cnephasia sedana mediterranea
- Cnephasia wilkinsoni directana
- Eana cyanescana
- Eana filipjevi
- Eana viardi

1951

- Cnephasia ecullyana
- Cnephasia orthoxyana
- Cnephasia orthoxyana confluentana
- Cnephasia orthoxyana reducta
- Cnephasia orthoxyana styx
- Cnephasia rielana
- Hypostephanuncia

1952

- Cnephasia interjecta confluens
- Cnephasia obsoletana cleuana
- Cnephasia obsoletana pseudotypica
- Cnephasia sedana meridionalis
- Cnephasia wilkinsoni

1988

- Coccidiphila charlierella
- Leptidea lorkovicci, becoming Leptidea reali Reissinger, 1989
- Micopterix liogierella
- Micopterix vallebonella

== Species named after him ==
- Leptidea reali Reissinger, 1989
