= Novitates Entomologicae =

Novitates entomologicae
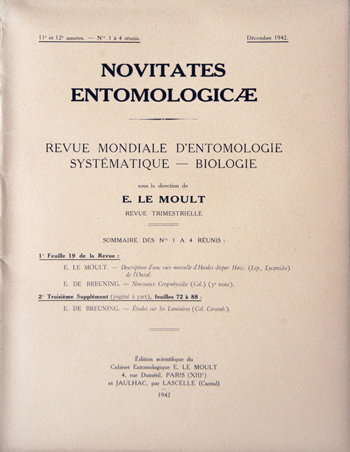
- Discipline: Entomology
- Language: French

Publication details
- History: 1931-1944
- Publisher: Eugène Le Moult (France)

Standard abbreviations
- ISO 4: Novit. Entomol.

Indexing
- ISSN: 0996-004X
- OCLC no.: 477589226

Novitates Entomologicae was a French entomological journal. It was published by Eugène Le Moult and established in 1931.

== Production ==
The size of the publication was very large: 25 × 33 cm, recalling something like the publications of Émile Deyrolle.

== Authors ==
These are mainly Le Moult himself on Lepidoptera and Coleoptera, (A.) Thierry on Buprestidae, P. Basilewsky on Carabidae and Stephan von Breuning on Cerambycidae.

== Main works ==
The best known works are those of Le Moult on the genus Prepona with four-colour plates and the ones of Breuning: Études sur les Lamiaires.

Études sur les Lamiaires were published in two parts. The first one has 568 pages and the second 615 pages. The special interest of these monographs are the numerous illustrations: 582 and 367 figures. This has been rarely the case in the other Breunings' works.
