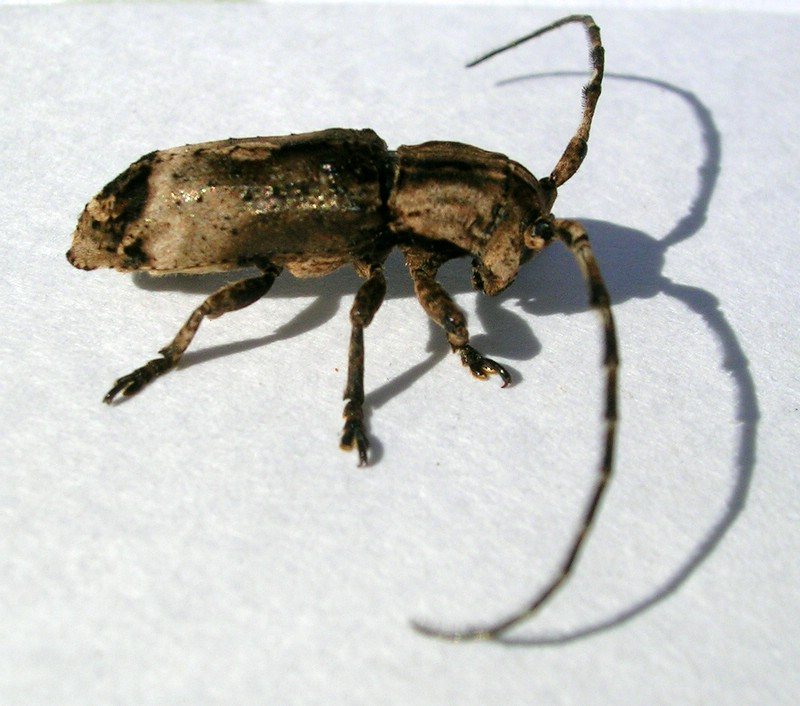
- Sthenias

Scientific classification
- Domain: Eukaryota
- Kingdom: Animalia
- Phylum: Arthropoda
- Class: Insecta
- Order: Coleoptera
- Suborder: Polyphaga
- Infraorder: Cucujiformia
- Family: Cerambycidae
- Subfamily: Lamiinae
- Tribe: Pteropliini
- Genus: Sthenias; Laporte, 1840

Synonyms
- Albosthenias Breuning, 1961; Anomamomus Fåhraeus, 1872; Chalanus Fåhraeus, 1872; Chalarus Fåhraeus, 1872; Stenias Guérin-Méneville, 1849; Thysanodes Newman, 1842

= Sthenias (beetle) =

Genus of beetles

Sthenias is a genus of flat-faced longhorns in the beetle family Cerambycidae. There are more than 20 described species in Sthenias, found mainly in Sub-Saharan Africa and southern Asia.

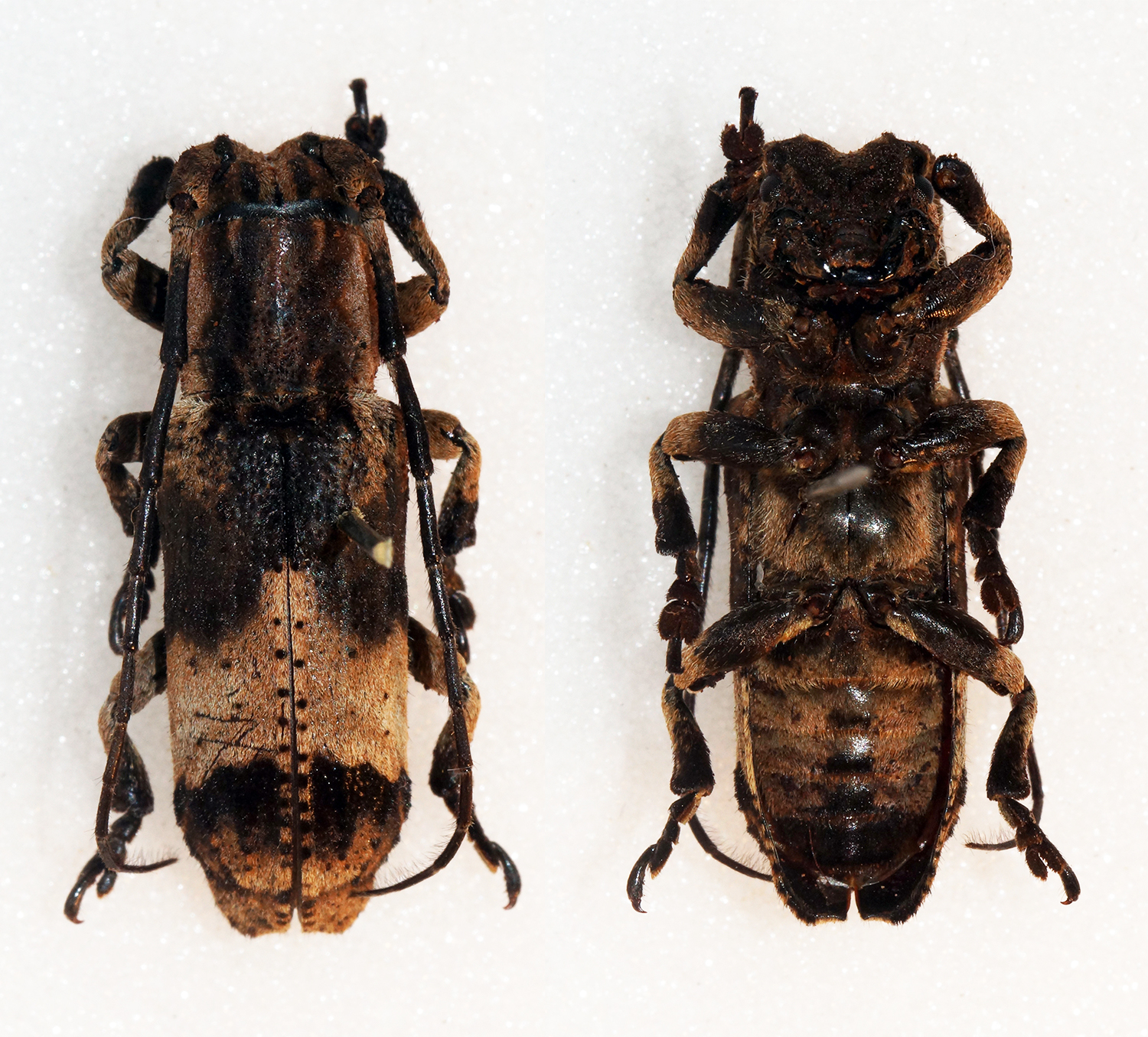
Sthenias pascoei

== Species ==
These 28 species belong to the genus Sthenias:

- subgenus Albosthenias Breuning, 1961
  - Sthenias albicollis Gahan, 1890
  - Sthenias microphthalmus Breuning, 1956
  - Sthenias partealbicollis Breuning, 1968
- Sthenias angustatus Pic, 1925
- Sthenias borneanus Breuning, 1982
- Sthenias burmanensis Breuning, 1938
- Sthenias crocatus (Olivier, 1800)
- Sthenias cylindrator (Fabricius, 1801)
- Sthenias damarensis Adlbauer, 2011
- Sthenias franciscanus Thomson, 1865
- Sthenias gahani (Pic, 1912)
- Sthenias gracilicornis Gressitt, 1937
- Sthenias gracilis Breuning, 1938
- Sthenias grisator (Fabricius, 1787)
- Sthenias javanicus Breuning, 1940
- Sthenias longeantennatus Breuning, 1938
- Sthenias maculiceps Gahan, 1890
- Sthenias madurae Boppe, 1914
- Sthenias pascoei Ritsema, 1888
- Sthenias persimilis Breuning, 1938
- Sthenias pictus Breuning, 1938
- Sthenias poleti Le Moult, 1938
- Sthenias pseudodorsalis Breuning, 1938
- Sthenias pseudodorsaloides Breuning, 1968
- Sthenias puncticornis Fairmaire, 1891
- Sthenias schmidi Adlbauer, 2021
- Sthenias tonkineus Pic, 1925
- Sthenias yunnanus Breuning, 1938
