= Eugène Barthe =

French entomologist (1862–1945)

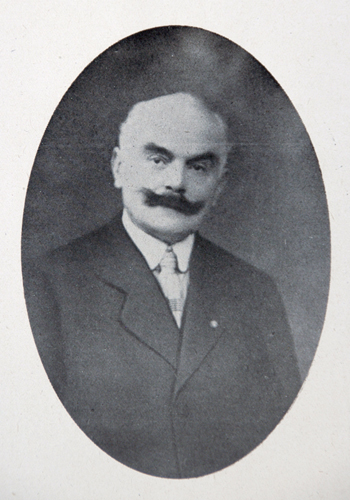
Eugène Barthe

Eugène Barthe (1862–1945) was a French entomologist. While living in Vienne (Isère), he created the journal Miscellanea Entomologica. In 1918, he moved into his father's house in Castanet-Tolosan (Haute-Garonne), where a street was later named in his honour. As well as editing the journal, he also wrote several books which act as supplements to the journal. These covered the beetle fauna of France and the Rhine Valley.

== Works ==
- 1896 – Catalogus Coleopterorum Galliae et Corsicae, 220 pages
- 1909–1924 – Faune Franco-Rhénane. Carabidae, 536 pages
- 1920–1936 – Faune Franco-Rhénane. Adephaga, 472 pages, 815 figures
- 1922 – Faune Franco-Rhénane. Liodidae, 119 pages
- 1926 – Faune Franco-Rhénane. Heteroceridae, 35 pages, 22 figures
- 1926 – Faune Franco-Rhénane. Georyssidae, 12 pages, 9 figures
- 1927 – Faune Franco-Rhénane. Dryopidae, 74 pages
- 1928 – Faune Franco-Rhénane. Throscidae, 23 pages, 10 figures
- 1928 – Faune Franco-Rhénane. Cerophytidae, Eucnemidae, 48 pages
- 1931 – Faune Franco-Rhénane. Cicindelidae, 41 pages, 23 figures
