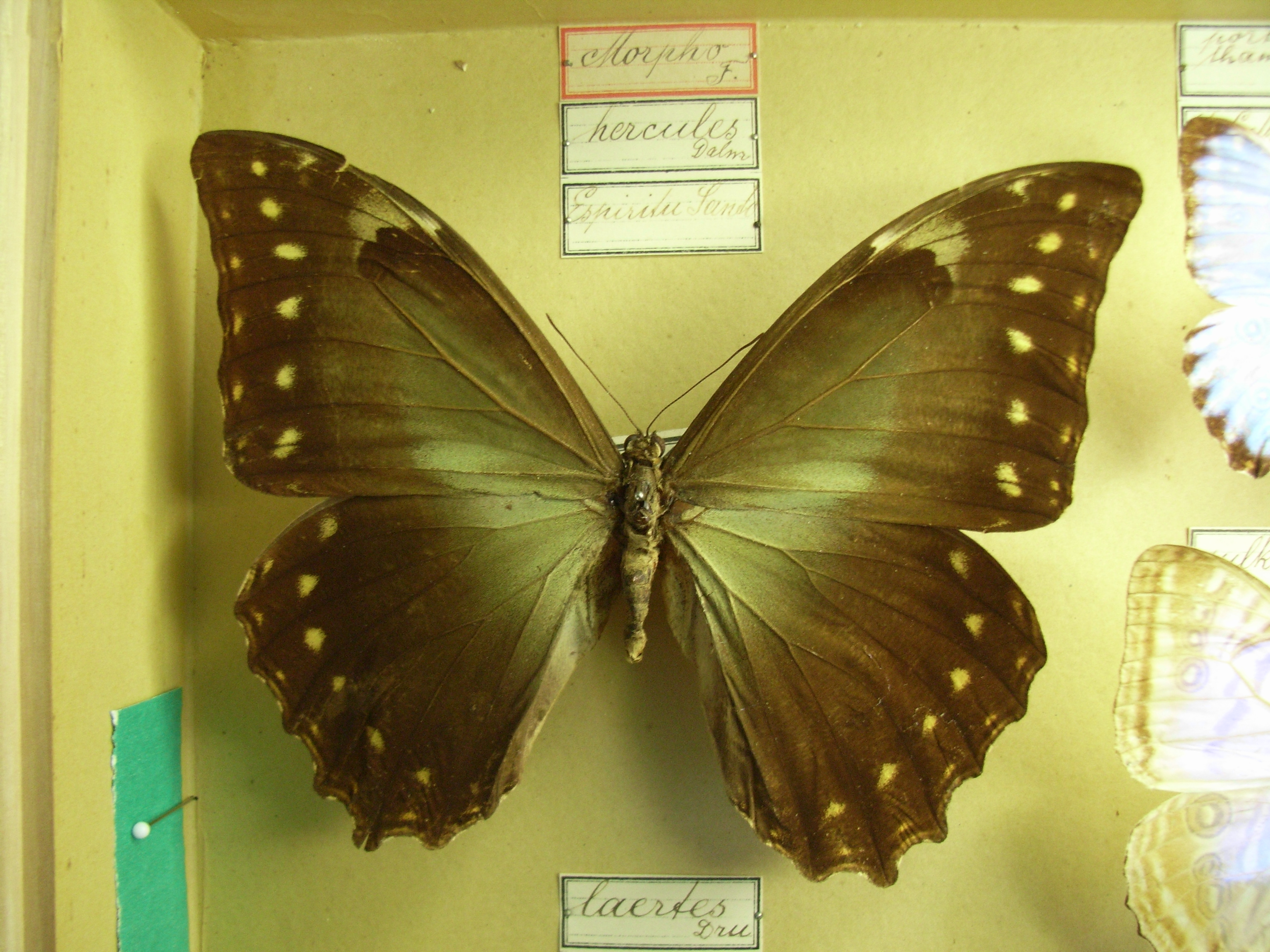
- Museum Wiesbaden

Scientific classification
- Kingdom: Animalia
- Phylum: Arthropoda
- Clade: Pancrustacea
- Class: Insecta
- Order: Lepidoptera
- Family: Nymphalidae
- Genus: Morpho
- Species: M. hercules

Binomial name
- Morpho hercules (Dalman, 1823)

= Morpho hercules =

Hercules morpho

Species of butterfly

Morpho hercules, the Hercules morpho, is a Neotropical butterfly found in Brazil and Paraguay.

== Description ==
The upper surface is grey green. The forewing has two rows of submarginal yellow dots, of which the proximal are considerably broader than the antemarginal. The patch before the apex of the cell is narrow, dark green, and subobsolete. The cell is black green. The discal area is glossy dark green. The distal border is broad, and deep black. The base of the forewing is dark, and the base of the hindwing is a somewhat lighter sea green.

The under surface of the forewing has two very large rounded ocelli between the medians, and two much smaller ones between the upper radial and the upper median. The proximal median spots are narrow, and irregular. The discal spot is black. The cell has two very broad white longitudinal bands, which are posteriorly confluent. The hindwing is predominantly red brown, with a silver-white median band about 3 mm in breadth. There are three anal ocelli with black irises.

== Subspecies and forms ==
- Morpho hercules diadema Fruhstorfer, 1905
- Morpho hercules itatiaya Weber, 1944
- Morpho hercules viridus Weber, 1944
- Morpho hercules f. irideus Zikán, 1935
- Morpho hercules f. violina Rousseau-Decelle, 1935
- Morpho hercules virida f. subtusdealbata Le Moult & Réal, 1962

== Biology ==
The larva feeds on Menispermaceae (Abuta selloana) and Musaceae.

== Etymology ==
It is named for the mythological hero Hercules.

== Related Species (Species Group) ==
- Morpho amphitryon
- Morpho richardus

== Gallery ==
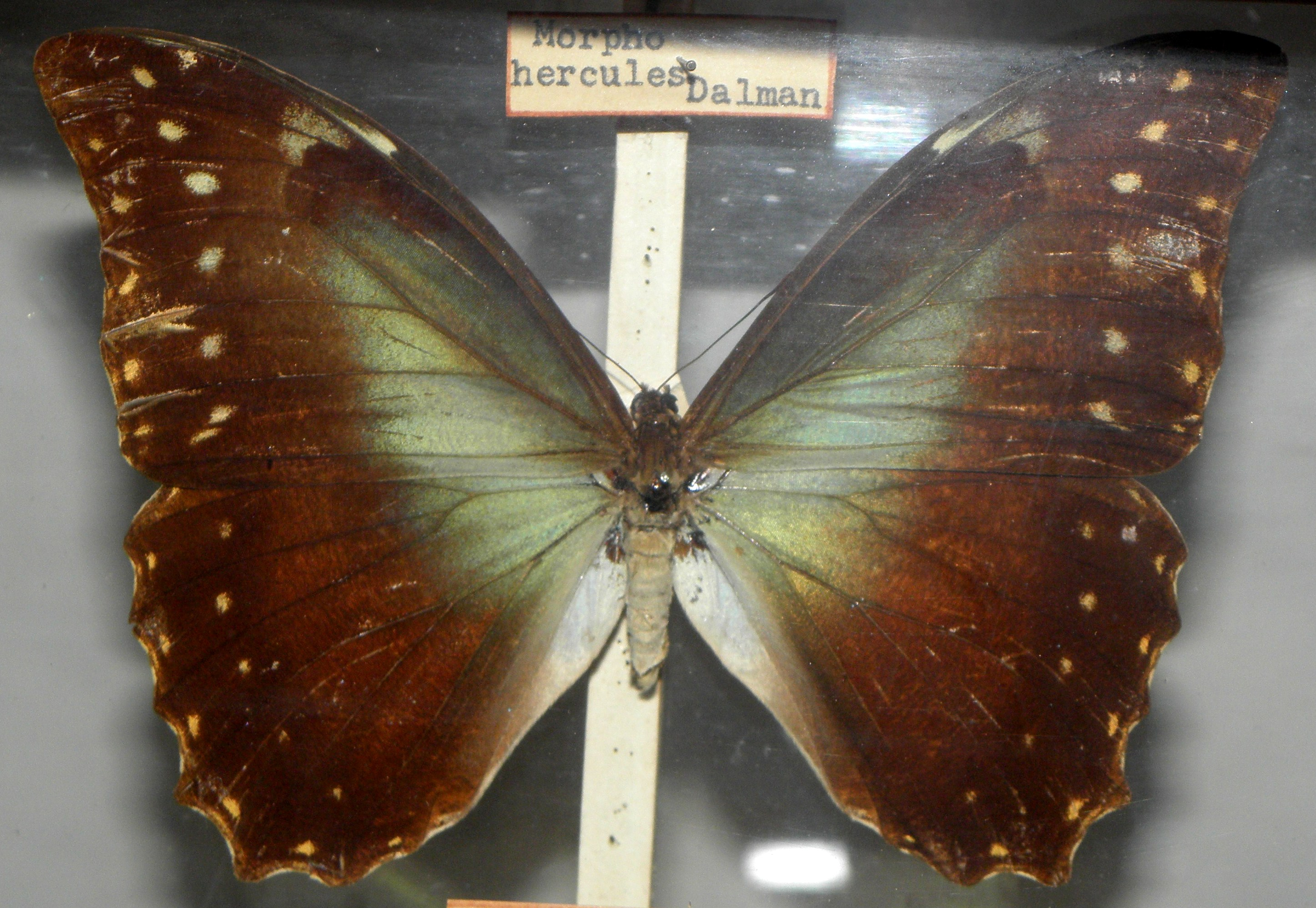
upperside

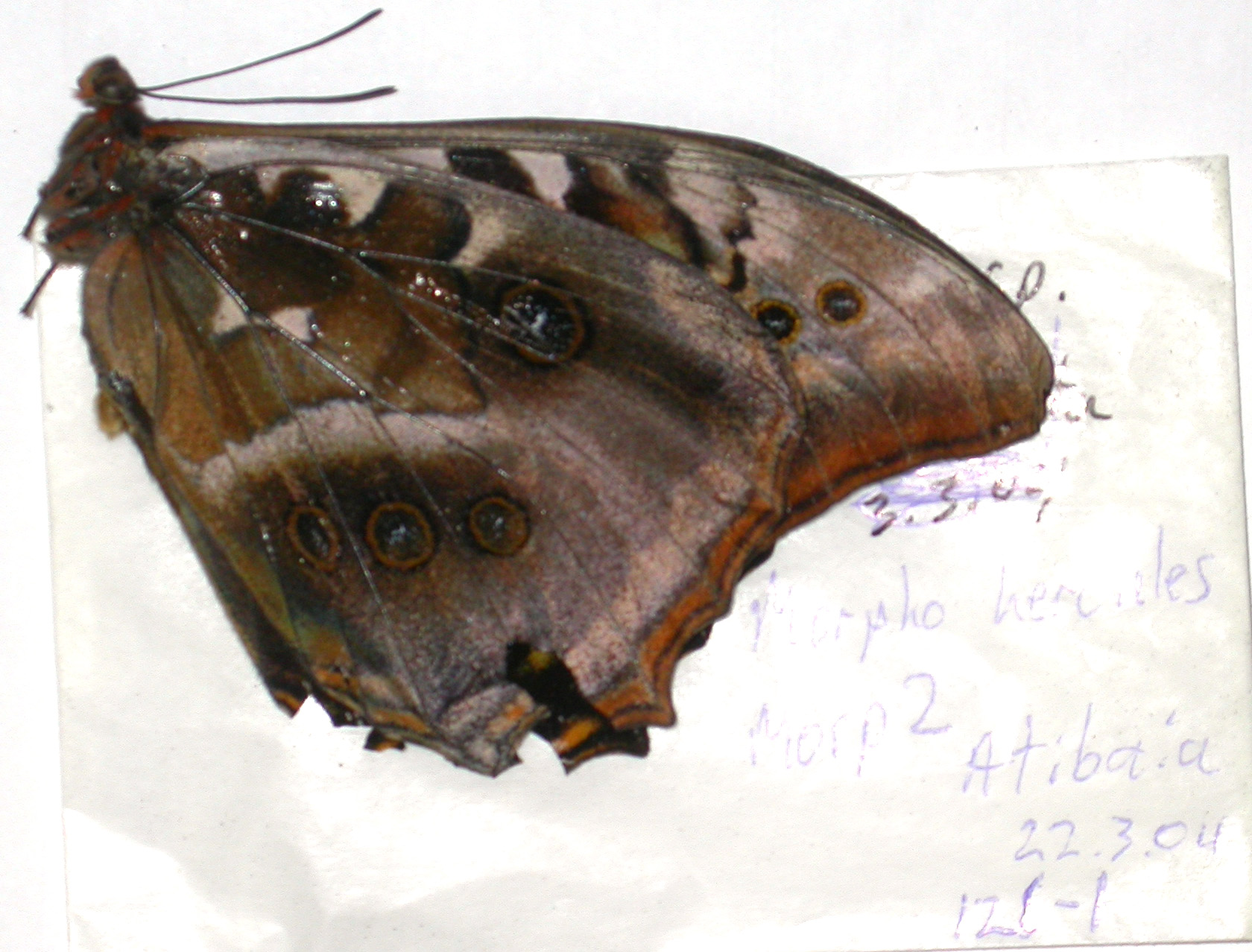
underside

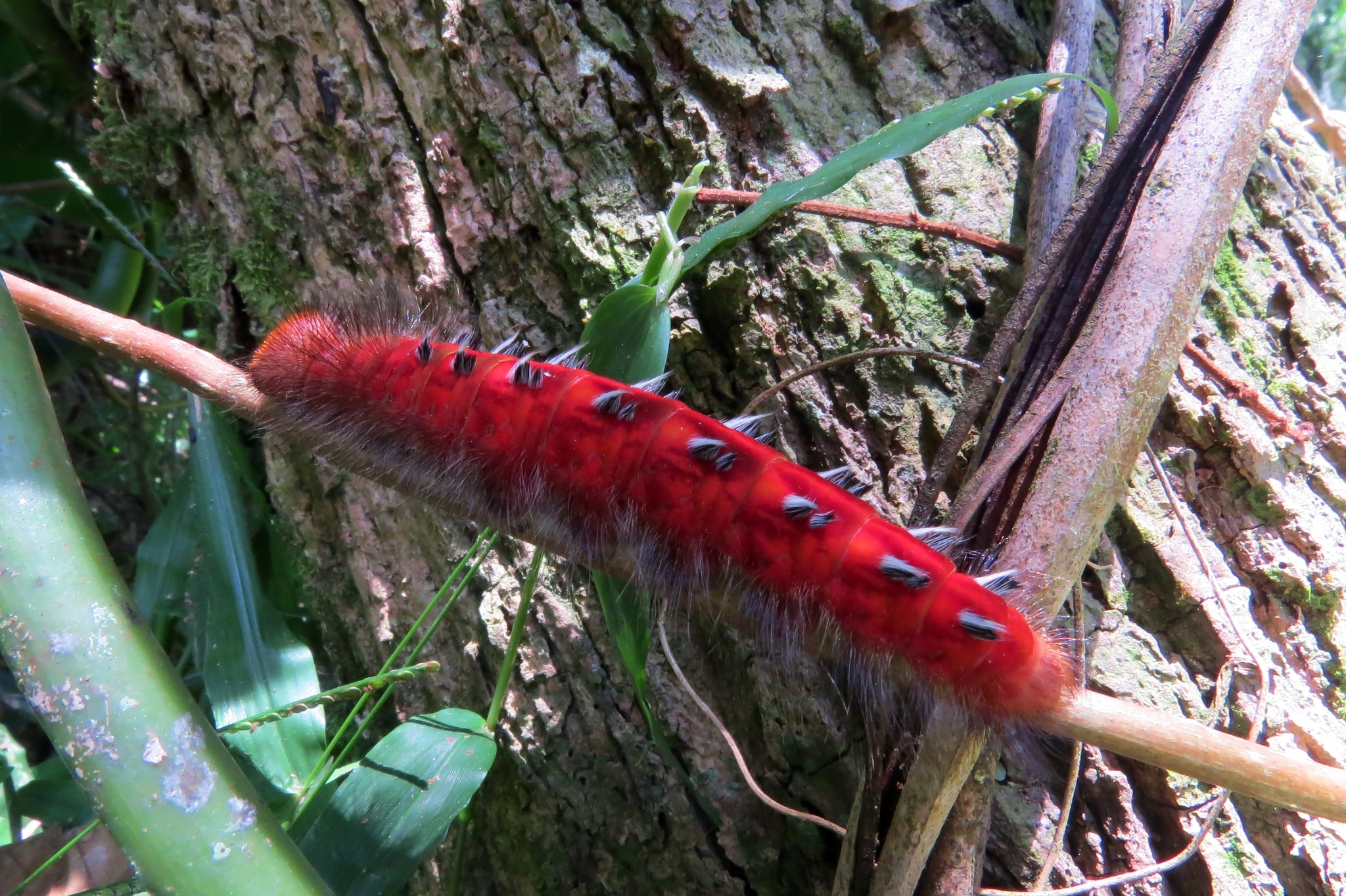
larva

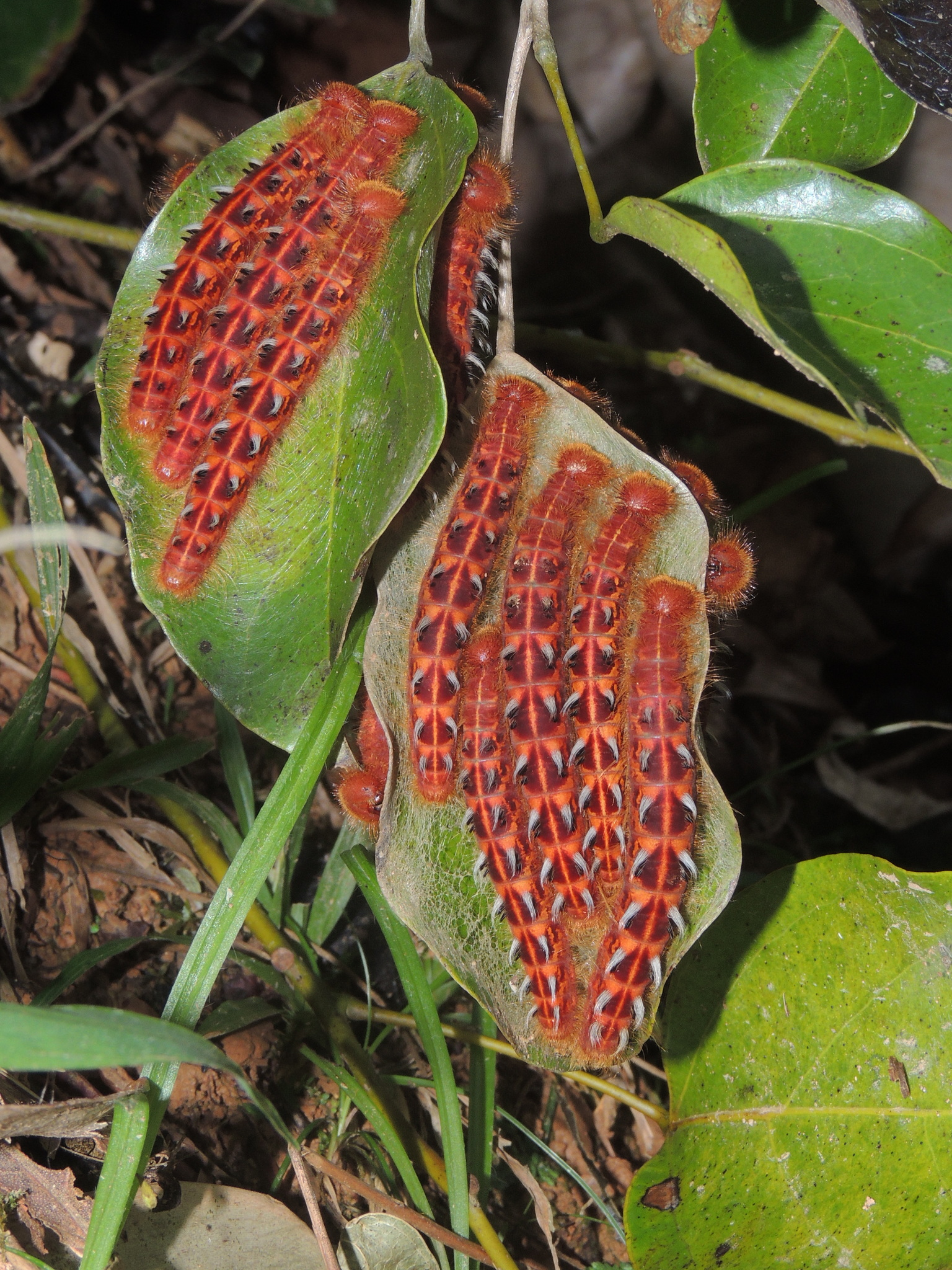
groups of early instar larvae

Morpho hercules diadema in Seitz
