= Eugène Le Moult =

French naturalist and entomologist

Eugène Le Moult (31 December 1882, Quimper – 26 January 1967, Paris) was a French naturalist and entomologist specialised in butterflies; hunter, businessman and collector.

Le Moult grew up in the tropical prison colony of French Guiana, where his cash-strapped organic-farmer father had taken a post to develop the road network. Here the adolescent discovered the beauty of the area's Morpho butterflies, and set about hunting and selling them to mainland France.

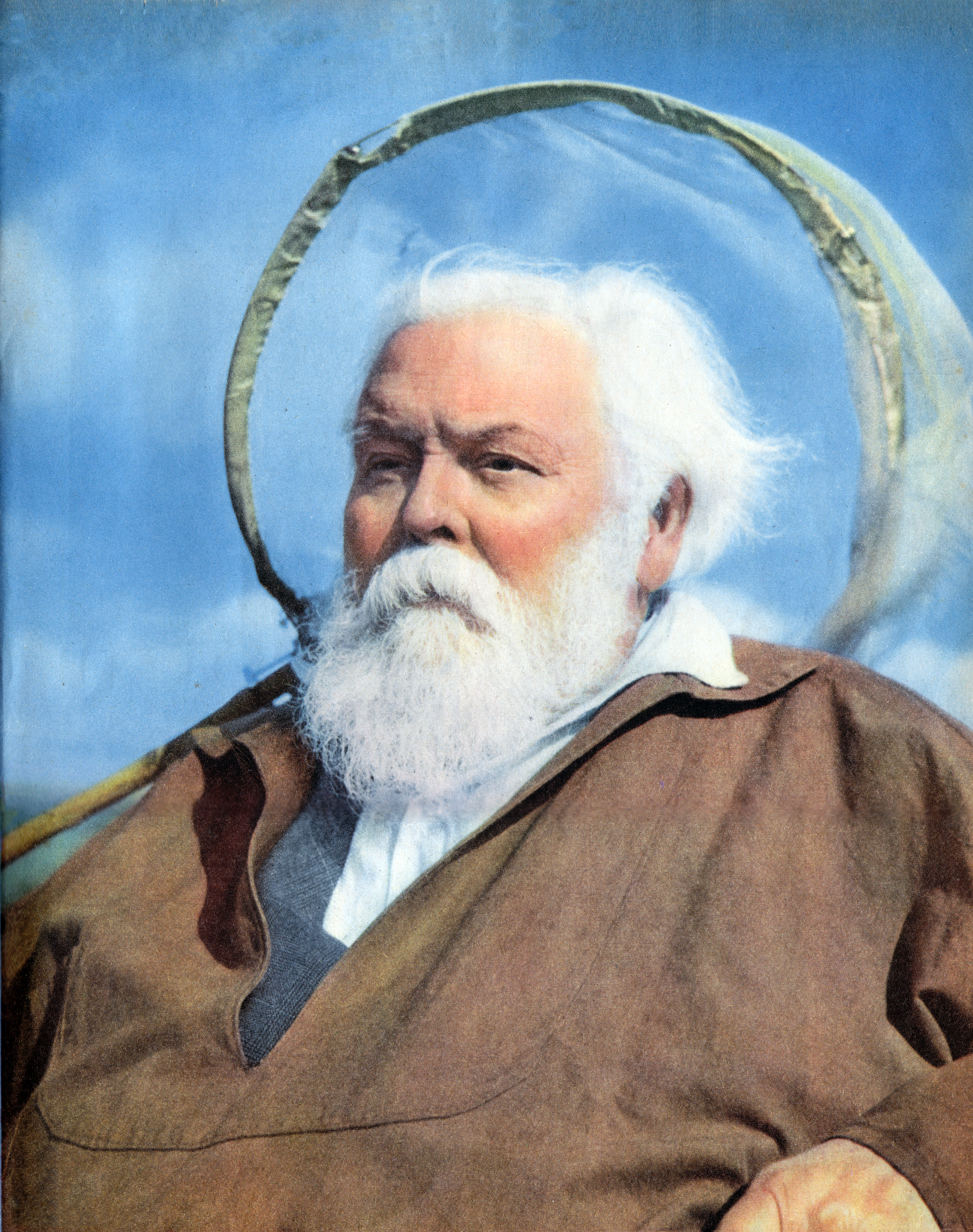
Portrait of Eugène Le Moult in the style of a Christian saint, a butterfly-net substituting the halo

French Guiana's only butterfly exporter from 1903 to 1920, Le Moult turned his business into the country's third largest industry, after gold and precious woods. To enlarge his collection he started to recruit hunters. In Guyana, at the time, the question of labour was simple: you had to use convicts. Therefore, for those men in "striped shirts", hunting butterflies became the prize for good conduct. The Steve McQueen/Dustin Hoffman movie Papillon references this.

Three years after moving back to Paris in 1908, Le Moult had the fourth largest collection of butterflies in the world, after those in museums in Washington and London. Hirohito (Showa Emperor of Japan), Sergei Khrushchev (son of the Soviet premier) and Vladimir Nabokov (author of Lolita) were amongst his Parisian cabinet's clients. In fifty years, 20 million insects passed through his business, of which a thousand carry his name: the "Le Moulti".

Le Moult was a renowned specialist of Morpho butterflies, and wrote—in association with Pierre Réal—the first revision of the taxon: Les Morpho d'Amérique du Sud et Centrale, Paris 1962–1963. This two-volume work with 20 plates in colour and 62 in black and white was until recently the classic monograph on the butterfly subfamily Morphinae. Seventy-five species are placed in eight subgenera, and the work generated 409 new names and made 750 names available as subspecific and varietal names. This is far more than most Morpho specialists accept and the motivation may have been commercial (Le Moult published his own work). It is, however, a meticulous species-level classification, describes dozens of subgeneric taxa, illustrates the adults and male genitalia for all species, and gives an account of type specimens. Le Moult also ensured the publication of journals Miscellanea Entomologica (founded by Eugène Barthe (1862–1945) and continued by Sciences Nat) and Novitates Entomologicae from 1931 to 1946. But above all he published a French edition of the work of Adalbert Seitz (1860–1938) under the title Les Macrolépidoptères du Globe in 16 volumes and 4 supplements.

Le Moult's exploits were popular in French mass market publications of the mid-1950s, including an extensive article in Paris Match 2 March 1955 and a four-page graphic short story on his adventures in Tintin of 24 May 1956.

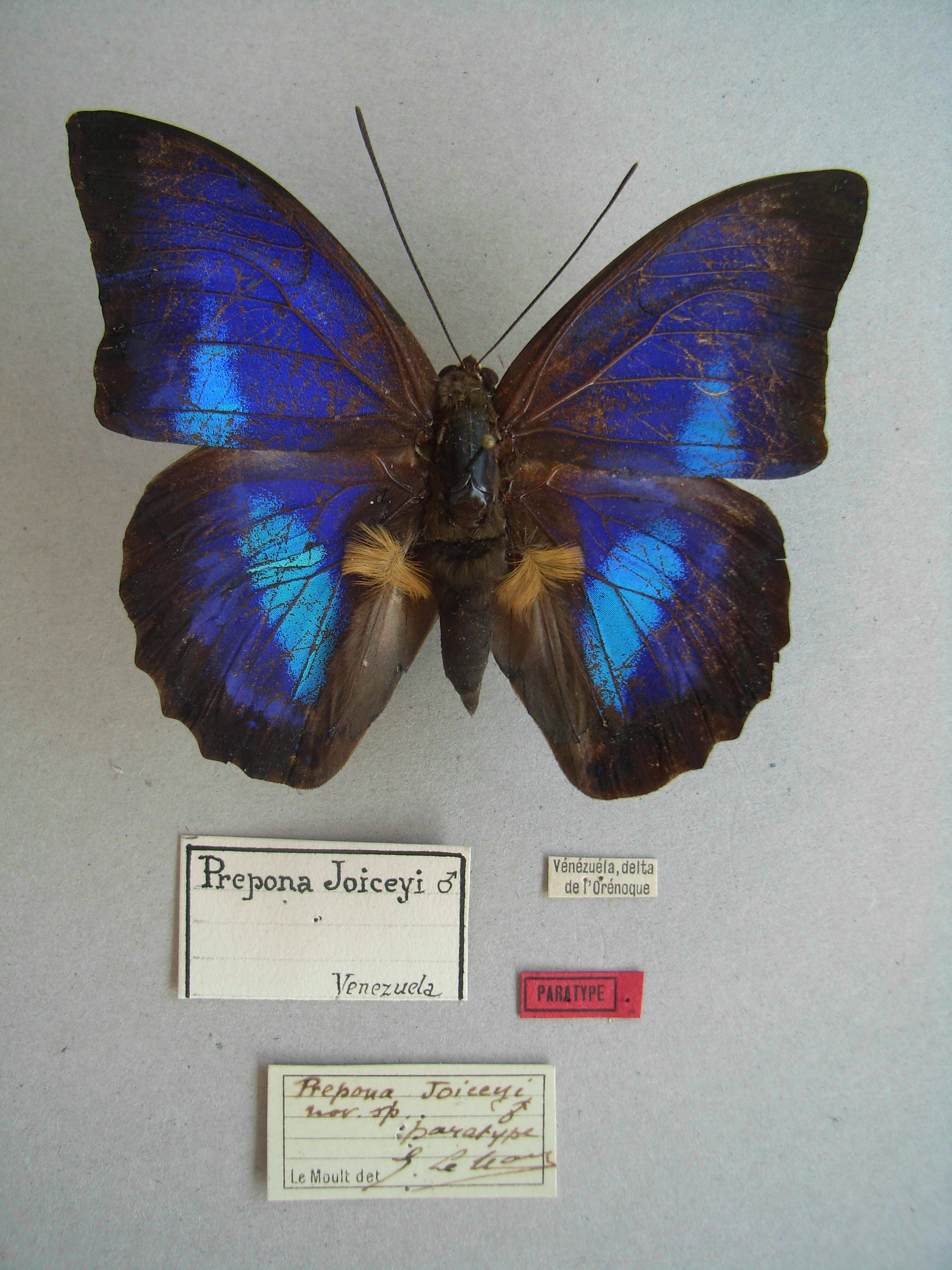
Paratype of Prepona joiceyi Le Moult, 1932. Now considered the a junior synonym of Prepona laertes louisa Butler, 1870. Many more paratypes were sold than were mentioned in the description.

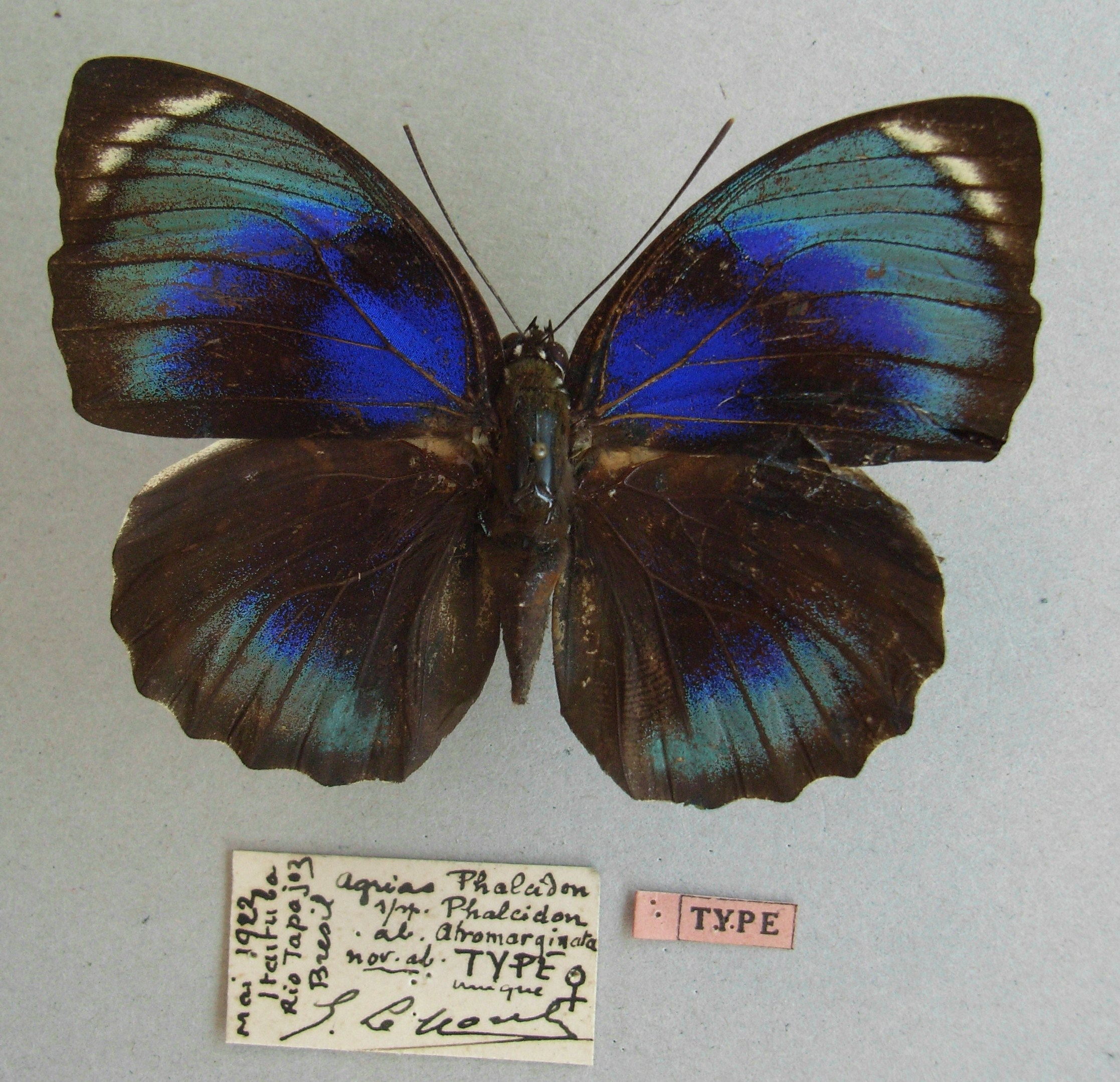
Holotype of aberration atromarginata of Agrias phalcidon phalcidon. Four names. Very expensive.

== Works ==
Partial list

- Etudes sur les Prepona: lépidoptères rhopalocères américains E. Le Moult, Paris: Novitates Entomologicae, 1932–1933.
- Révision du genre Helicopis (Erycinidae) E. Le Moult, Paris: Novitates Entomologicae, 1939.
- Revision de la classification des Apaturinae de l'ancien monde: suivie d'une monographie de plusieurs genres E. Le Moult, Paris: Editions scientifiques du Cabinet entomologique E. Le Moult. 1950-.
- with P. Réal Les Morpho d'Amérique du Sud et Centrale. E. Le Moult, Paris: Editions scientifiques du Cabinet entomologique E. Le Moult. 1962–1963.

== Collections ==
- World Cerambycidae, Royal Belgian Institute of Natural Sciences, Brussels.
- Buprestidae, Bostrichidae, ex parte Cerambycidae, Curculionidae, Scarabaeidae, Elateridae Thünen-Institut for Wood Research, Hamburg
- African material in the Royal Central African Museum, Tervuren.
