= Stephan von Breuning (entomologist) =

Austrian entomologist (1894–1983)

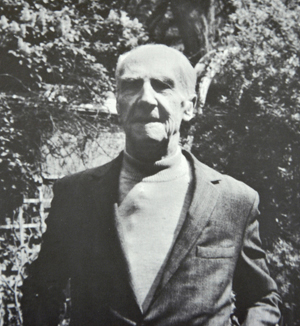
- Born: 21 November 1894; Vienna, Austria-Hungary
- Died: 11 March 1983 (aged 88); Paris, France
- Known for: Études sur les Lamiaires
- Scientific career
- Fields: Entomology

Stephan von Breuning (21 November 1894 – 11 March 1983) was an Austrian entomologist who specialised in the study of beetles (coleopterology), particularly those within the Carabus, Calosoma and Ceroglossus, all of which them are genera of the Carabidae family (ground beetles) and Cerambycidae (longhorn beetles).

== Career ==
As an amateur working on the rich collections of the Muséum national d'Histoire naturelle in Paris, France, von Breuning described 7,894 taxa of Cerambycidae.

== Works ==
The complete list of von Breuning's entomological works is published in the Bulletin de la Société Sciences Nat, number 41. Among his most famous works there are the Monographie Der Gattung Carabus, published between 1932 and 1934 by Troppau, Schlesien, Cechoslovak Republik, and Études sur les Lamiaires, published in Novitates Entomologicae, 1934–1946.

== Personal life ==
Von Breuning and his wife lived in a small studio at the top of an old building on rue Durantin, Paris 18ème.
