= Blue morpho =

Blue morpho may refer to several species of distinctly blue butterfly under the genus Morpho, including:

- Morpho achilles (Achilles morpho)
- Morpho cypris (Cypris blue morpho)
- Morpho didius (Didius blue morpho)
- Morpho helenor (Helenor blue morpho)
- Morpho menelaus (Menelaus blue morpho)
- Morpho peleides (Peleides blue morpho)
- Morpho rhetenor (Rhetenor blue morpho)

== Other uses ==
- The Blue Morpho, a character in the animated adventure-comedy series The Venture Bros
- Blue Morpho (album), 2026 album by Ed O'Brien, or the title song
- "Blue Morpho", a song by King Gizzard & the Lizard Wizard from Butterfly 3000
