= Blue butterfly =

Blue butterfly may refer to:

== Butterflies ==
- Lycaenidae, a family of butterflies
  - Polyommatinae, a subfamily consisting of the blue butterflies
    - Common blue (Polyommatus icarus)
    - Large blue (Phengaris arion)
    - Small blue (Cupido minimus)
  - Euphilotes, a subfamily consisting of blue butterflies
    - El Segundo Blue (Euphilotes battoides)
- Blue morpho (disambiguation), several species in the genus Morpho

== Other uses ==
- The Blue Butterfly, Canadian film
- Blue Butterfly (album), JPOP album
