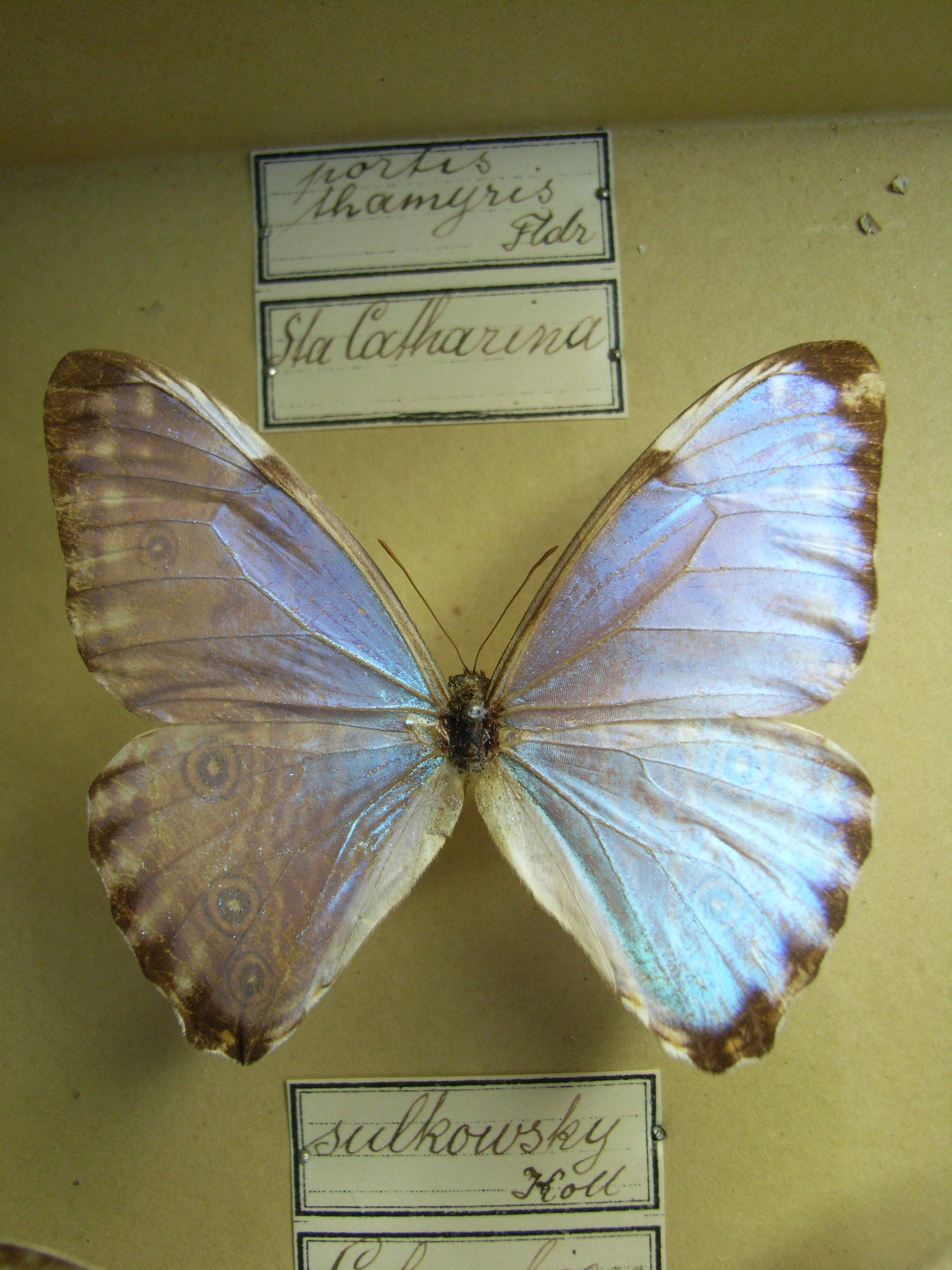

Scientific classification
- Domain: Eukaryota
- Kingdom: Animalia
- Phylum: Arthropoda
- Class: Insecta
- Order: Lepidoptera
- Family: Nymphalidae
- Genus: Morpho
- Species: M. portis

Binomial name
- Morpho portis (Hübner, 1821)

= Morpho portis =

Species of butterfly

Morpho portis is a Neotropical butterfly. It is found in Brazil, Uruguay, Venezuela, Colombia, Peru, and Paraguay. Several subspecies and many forms have been described. The larvae feed on Gramineae (Bambusa and Chusquea meyeriana).

== Description ==
M. portis is the oldest name for a pretty species, which has generally found its way into collections under the name M. cytheris Godart. M. portis may be regarded as the type of a small group which embraces species with the sexes alike, in contrast to the forms of the adonis group with highly differentiated, multicolored females. The two subspecies can be separated with certainty.

M. p. portis Hübner according to von Bönninghausen is never found in the plains, but only at higher elevations of the Sierra Geral, as at Petrópolis and Novo Friburgo in the state of Rio de Janeiro, where it is by no means common. The upper surface differs from that of the southern branch-race in its unusually delicate light blue color, shot throughout with glossy reflections, and which only distally darkens somewhat towards violet.

M. p. sidera Fruhstorfer denotes a form without apical ocellus on the underside of the hindwing, which bears pale yellow instead of reddish-brown longitudinal bands on an unusually light ground and in addition has the silver bands nearly twice as broad as in normal M. portis.

M. p. thamyris Felder is sufficiently characterized by the broader black border of the forewing and the darker blue gloss of the upper surface, bears beneath somewhat larger and more uniform ocelli, broader and more intensively red-brown longitudinal bands and consequently reduced silver stripes. The female is rather rare, larger than the male, adorned with larger anteterminal and submarginal white crescents and small longitudinal stripes and with the wings more rounded. This elegant Morphid is very local in Sta. Catharina, but common in suitable localities (timber forests overgrown with bamboo and intersected by large rivers), M. p. thamyris flies chiefly in the afternoon from 3 to 4 o'clock, when M. anaxibia is already disappearing into the shade of the woods. The butterflies fly slowly, scarcely 1 to 2 meters above the ground, and are fond of resting with closed wings on bamboo twigs. Also on the high lying country of Lages I met with M. p. thamyris in the damp woods of the valleys and the primeval forests on the Alto Uruguay. Flies principally in March. In Rio Grande according to Mabilde two generations occur, the first flying for 15–20 days in the spring, the second for nearly a month in the autumn.

M. p. psyche Felder of which I have the type before me through the kindness of the directors of the Tring Museum, seems to be due to discoloration. Upper surface darker blue than in M. portis; distal border of the forewing broader, more uniform. Under surface: ocelli as in M. portis, but the silvery longitudinal band suppressed, the wings themselves faded into a lighter brown. Brazil.

== Subspecies ==
- M. p. portis Brazil (Rio de Janeiro, Espírito Santo, São Paulo, Minas Gerais)
- M. p. thamyris C. & R. Felder, 1867 Paraguay, Brazil (Santa Catarina, Mato Grosso, São Paulo, Rio Grande do Sul) - disputed rank
