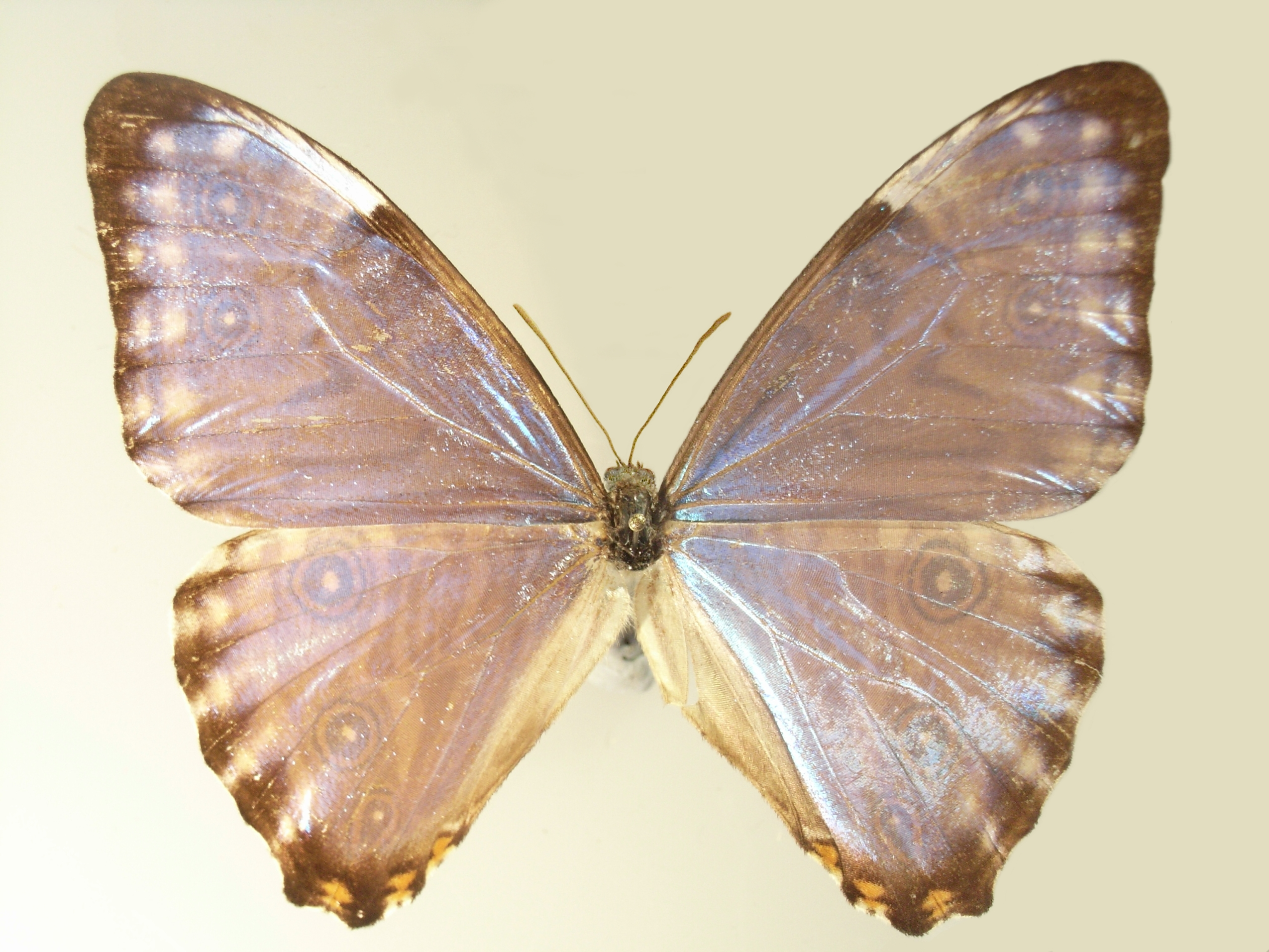
- Male

Scientific classification
- Kingdom: Animalia
- Phylum: Arthropoda
- Clade: Pancrustacea
- Class: Insecta
- Order: Lepidoptera
- Family: Nymphalidae
- Genus: Morpho
- Species: M. thamyris

Binomial name
- Morpho thamyris C. & R. Felder, 1867

= Morpho thamyris =

Thamyris morpho

Species of butterfly

Morpho thamyris, the Thamyris morpho, is a Neotropical butterfly found in Paraguay and Brazil (Santa Catarina, Mato Grosso, São Paulo, Rio Grande do Sul).

Many subspecies have been described.

== Etymology ==
Thamyris was a singer in Greek mythology who was so proud of his skill that he boasted he could outsing the Muses. His story is told in the Iliad.

== Taxonomy ==
Some authors consider Morpho thamyris to be a subspecies of Morpho portis (Hübner, [1821])
