= Morpho cypris =

Cypris morpho
- Male

Scientific classification
- Kingdom: Animalia
- Phylum: Arthropoda
- Clade: Pancrustacea
- Class: Insecta
- Order: Lepidoptera
- Family: Nymphalidae
- Genus: Morpho
- Species: M. cypris

Binomial name
- Morpho cypris (Westwood, 1851)

Species of butterfly

Morpho cypris, the Cypris morpho, is a Neotropical butterfly. It is found in Panama, Costa Rica, Nicaragua, Colombia, Venezuela, Trinidad and Tobago and Ecuador. Several subspecies and many forms have been described.

== Description ==
Plate from Adalbert Seitz showing a male and female.

Lower image, female

Morpho cypris replaces M. rhetenor in Colombia and Central America and one might strictly speaking unite it with the latter as a geographical branch unless the anatomy shows essential differences, M. cypris is here, however, kept separate on account of the rounded shape of the forewing and the somewhat more vertically placed white median band of the upper surface, M. cypris and M. helena outshine even the other Morphids in their incomparable gloss and according to Schatz 'M. cypris in particular is a true gem, unequalled in its brilliance throughout the whole of nature'.

According to the fall of the light the blue of this incomparable insect shows a more violet or more greenish gloss and the delicate white band a yellowish tone or more of a tinge of rose colour. This is due to the fact that their wings have iridescence. This means that depending on the viewing angle of the wings, the wings will change colour. This happens because of the interaction of light and nanostructures on the wings. The blue is of such ethereal purity and such intensive lustre that all the other colours appear faded or dull in comparison. Only the Malayo-Australian Ornithoptera can outrival the Morphids, adding as they do to the brilliance of their golden green colouring the further charm of a quite distinguished form and wing contour. The scaling itself, as in M. rhetenor, remains fixed, but the interference scales are wanting in the normal females so that these are of the primitive yellowish ochreous (brassolid) ground colour common to all the species of the M. adonis group.

== Etymology ==
Cypris is another name for Aphrodite, the beautiful Greek goddess of love.
