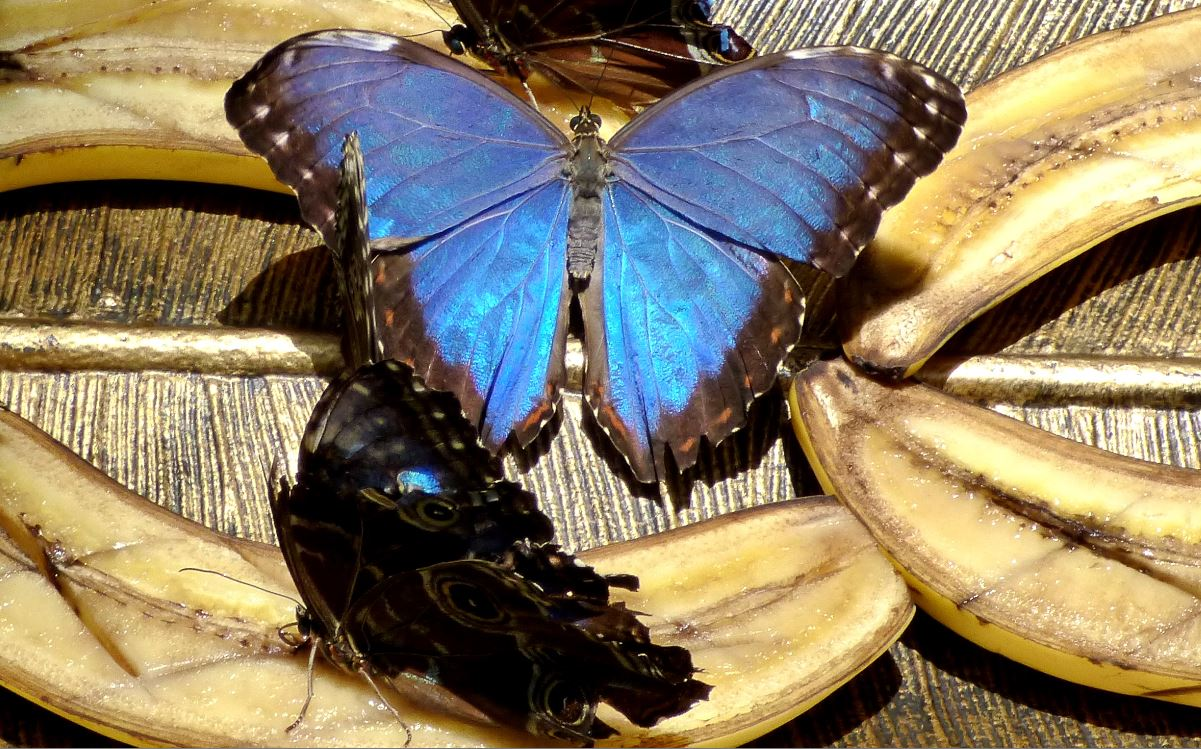

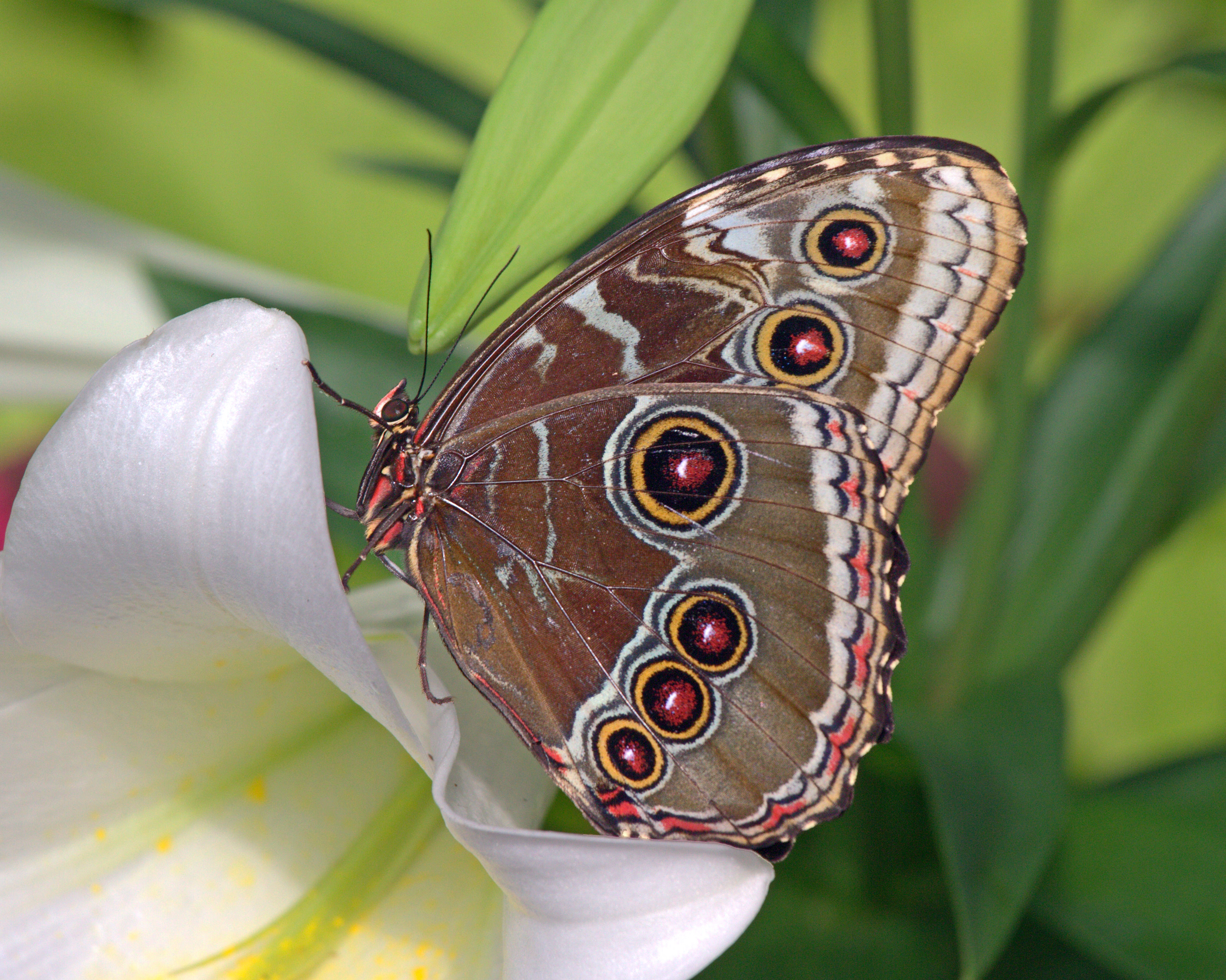

Scientific classification
- Kingdom: Animalia
- Phylum: Arthropoda
- Clade: Pancrustacea
- Class: Insecta
- Order: Lepidoptera
- Family: Nymphalidae
- Genus: Morpho
- Species: M. peleides

Binomial name
- Morpho peleides Kollar, 1850

Synonyms
- Morpho confusa Le Moult & Réal, 1962; Morpho hyacinthus inderivata Le Moult & Réal; Morpho helenor peleides

= Morpho peleides =

Peleides blue morpho

Species of butterfly

Morpho peleides, the Peleides blue morpho, or the common morpho, is an iridescent tropical butterfly.

== Taxonomy ==
Most authorities believe that Morpho peleides is a subspecies of Morpho helenor, and is sometimes referred to as Morpho helenor peleides. Thirteen subspecies of Morpho peleides have been described, including Morpho peleides chococanus, Morpho peleides limpida, and Morpho peleides zela.

== Description ==
M. peleides are considered large butterflies, with adult wingspan measuring between 5–8 inches. Some subspecies, such as Morpho peleides hyacinthus, are smaller than the average M. peleides subspecies.

=== Wings ===
Morpho species can be recognized by the bright blue color featured on the dorsal side of their wings. The iridescent blue is caused by light reflection and interference from the layered scales on the wings surface. Each scale has ridged stripes which cause this interference. M. peleides have two types of scales; cover and ground. Ground scales show more intense iridescence than cover scales.

The ventral sides of M. peleides wings are brown, red, and white, with distinct eyespots. These eyespots can serve as intimidation to predators, or as protection from predators when acting as camouflage. Additional examples of the difference between the ventral and dorsal side of M. peleides wings can be seen here.

M. peleides wing structure is unique, as their micro-nanostructure allows their wings to be almost completely superhydrophobic.

=== Sexual dimorphism ===
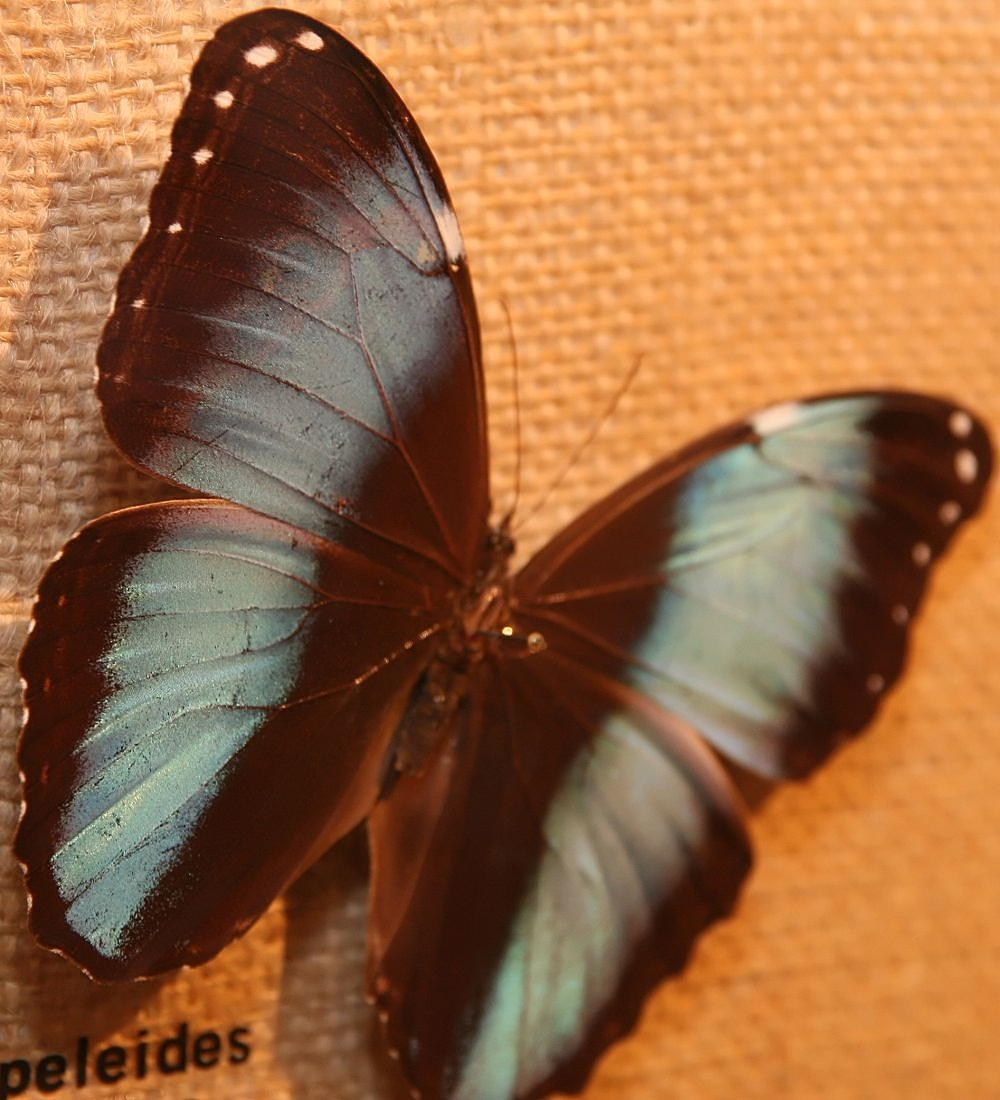
Female M. peleides

Morpho peleides have low sexual dimorphism in both wing pattern and overall size. On males, the blue iridescence on the dorsal side of the wings extends to within a centimeter of the wing margin, where the margin is black, with 5–6 white spots. Females have a similar wing patter, however the black margins are twice as wide. Female M. peleides are slightly larger than their male counterparts. Examples of sexual dimorphism within the species can be seen at the butterflies of America website.

== Habitat ==
Morpho peleides is the most geographically spread species of Morpho butterflies. M. peleides live throughout Central America, Mexico, and Paraguay. M. peleides live primarily in montane areas and tropical wetland forests, however some subspecies, including M. peleides limpida in Costa Rica, are mostly confined to primary and secondary growth forests.

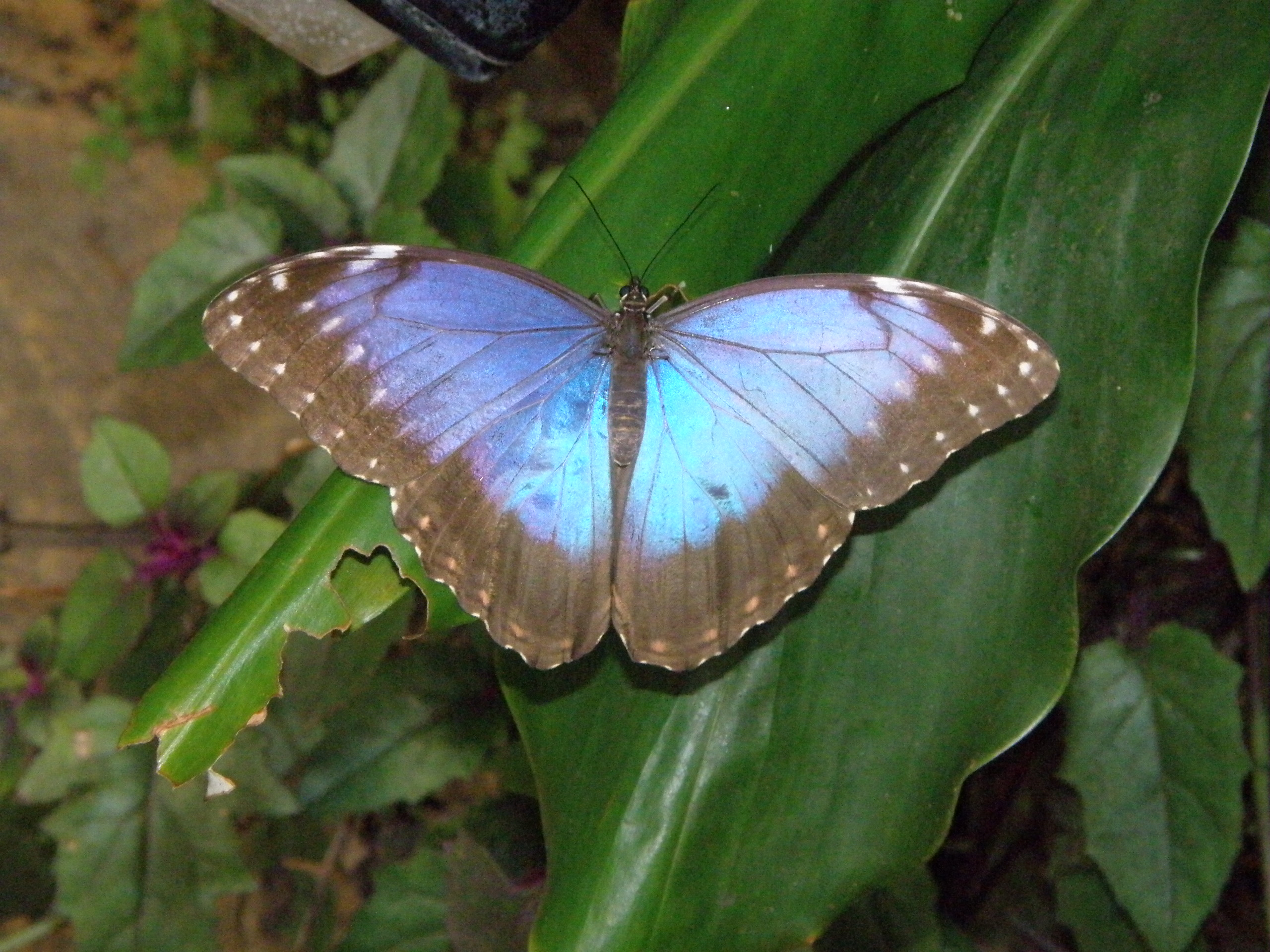
Male M. peleides

== Hearing ==
Tympanal hearing organs of butterflies are morphologically diverse, and Morpho peleides have been studied thoroughly as they have particularly unusual tympanal morphology. M. peleides hearing organ is called the Vogel organ, which is located on the ventral side of the forewing. The Vogel organ has a separate inner and outer membrane. These membranes vibrate differently, and are thought to be a method to expand the range of frequencies M. peleides can detect. M. peleides are capable of both amplitude and frequency discrimination due to their unique Vogel organ. It is thought that M. peleides unique hearing organs are adapted to be able to detect to avian predators.

== Lifecycle ==
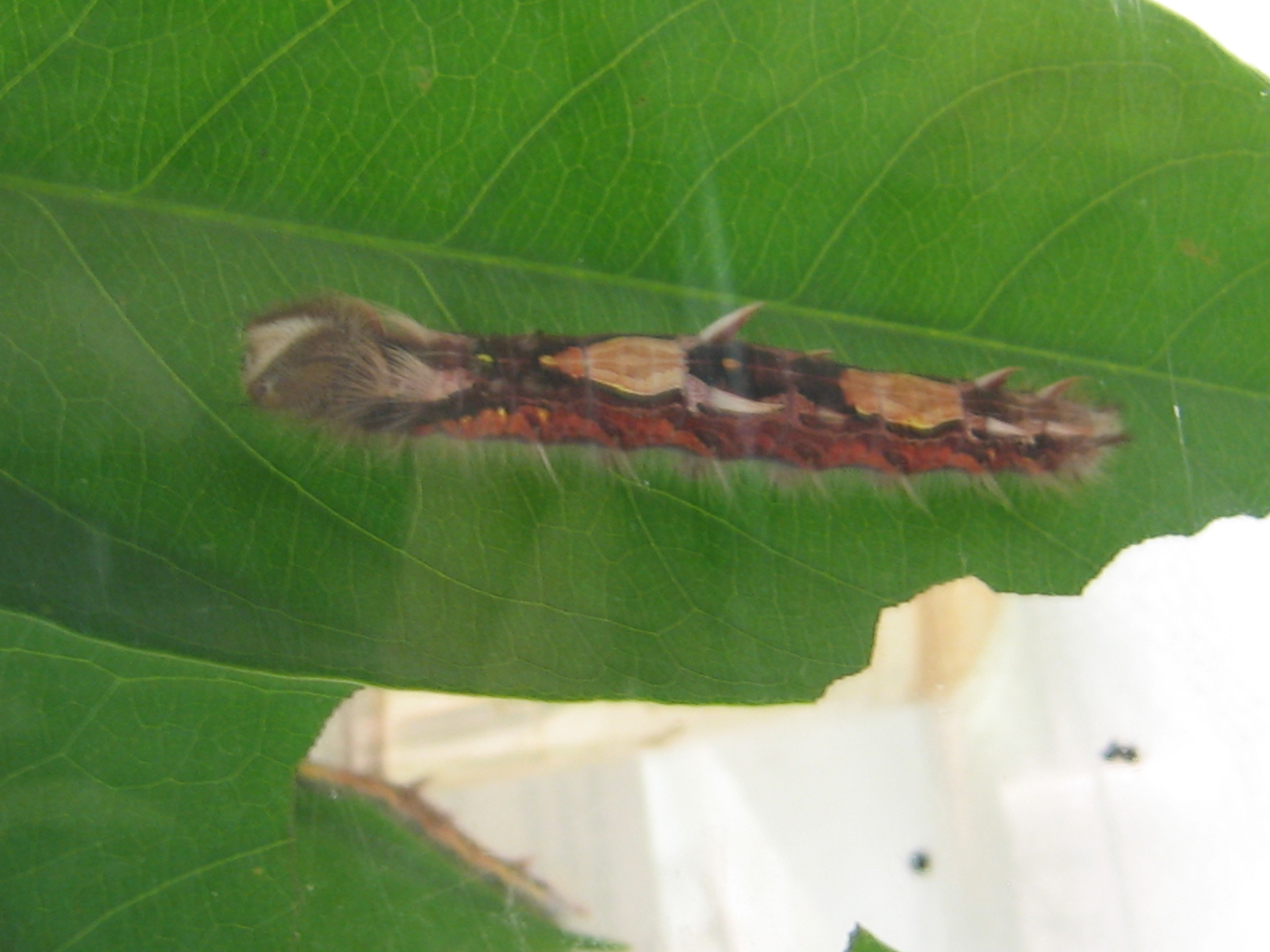
Fifth instar M. peleides larva.

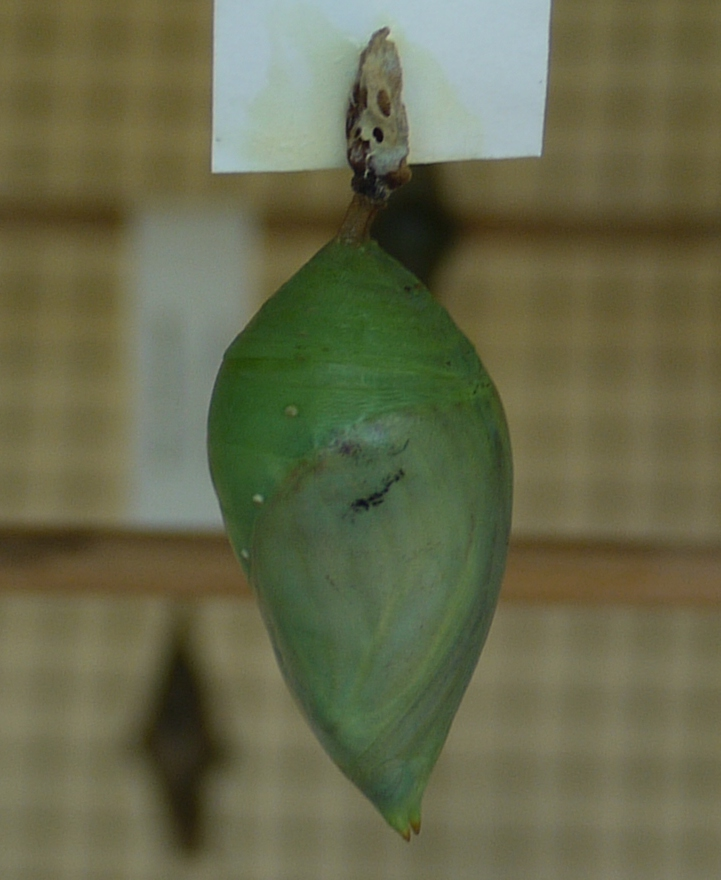
M. peleides chrysalis

Lepidoptera undergo complete metamorphosis, with larvae, pupae, and adult stages. The eggs of Morpho peleides are 1–2 millimeters in diameter, and are green in color with brown spots. Depending on the subspecies, the egg stage may last between 7–16 days. M. peleides eggs are susceptible to mold, as well as egg parasitism by Oonencytrus wasps. The larval stage of M. peleides has five instars, and can grow from 5.25 millimeters in length after hatching, to 74–93 millimeters at their final instar (depending on subspecies). At early instars, larva appear greenish yellow with marron patches, with tufts of red and white hair. At later stages, the body turns brown. The larval stage lasts approximately 40–50 days total. Larvae of all instars are vulnerable to Tachinid parasites. The prepupal stage lasts three days. During this stage, the entire body changes to a green color, except for the tufts of hair. Afterwards, the pupa stage lasts 14 days. During metamorphosis, the larvae loses a large amount of fat.

Host plants for M. peleides are limited to eight species, including both flowering and non-flowering plants. Some of the host plants include Machaerium seemannii, Mucuna urens, and various species of Inga and Lonchocarpus.

=== Larval behavior ===
Immediately after hatching, larvae will consume its empty egg shell for nutrients. Larvae of Morpho peleides are exclusively dawn and dusk feeders, however younger larvae within the first two instars feed earlier in the evening and later in the morning than older larvae. When not feeding, larvae are fully inactive. Movement is associated exclusively with feeding, and larvae are only mobile when moving from resting positions to feeding sites. Resting and feeding sites are rarely on the same leaf. When not feeding, larvae will build silken mats to rest on. Larvae will always return to the same mat after feeding periods.

=== Reproduction ===
In courtship, male M. peleides will chase the female in a circular pattern. Copulation can last anywhere from eight hours to three days. Females will lay eggs singularly, however may lay up to five eggs per day. Eggs are laid on the dorsal surfaces of older leaves, and especially leaves that are heavily shaded.

== Diet ==
Unlike most butterflies M. peleides do not feed from flower nectar. Adult M. peleides are frugivores, feeding from decayed or rotting fruit. However, if fruit is unavailable, they have been known to feed on tree sap from Samanea trees. The proboscis tip of M. peleides has a brush-shaped appearance, which is thought to be a morphological adaptation to consuming rotting fruit, rather than nectar.

Larvae of M. peleides feed on plants such as Patagonia pyramidata and Paullinia pinnata, depending on the subspecies. The diet of larva plays a major role in determining sterol composition in the adult butterfly later on in life.

== Photographs ==
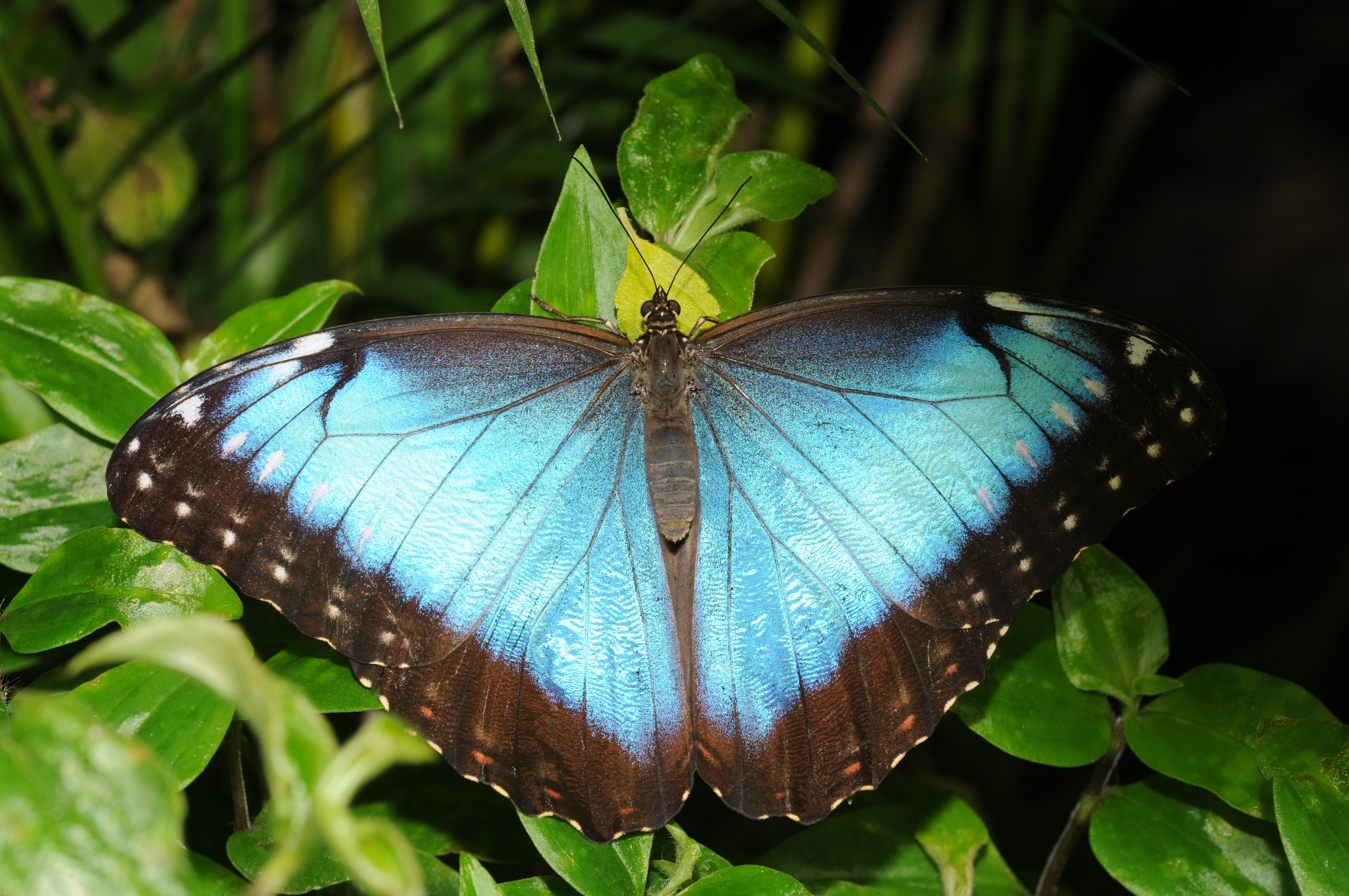
Dorsal view of M. peleides

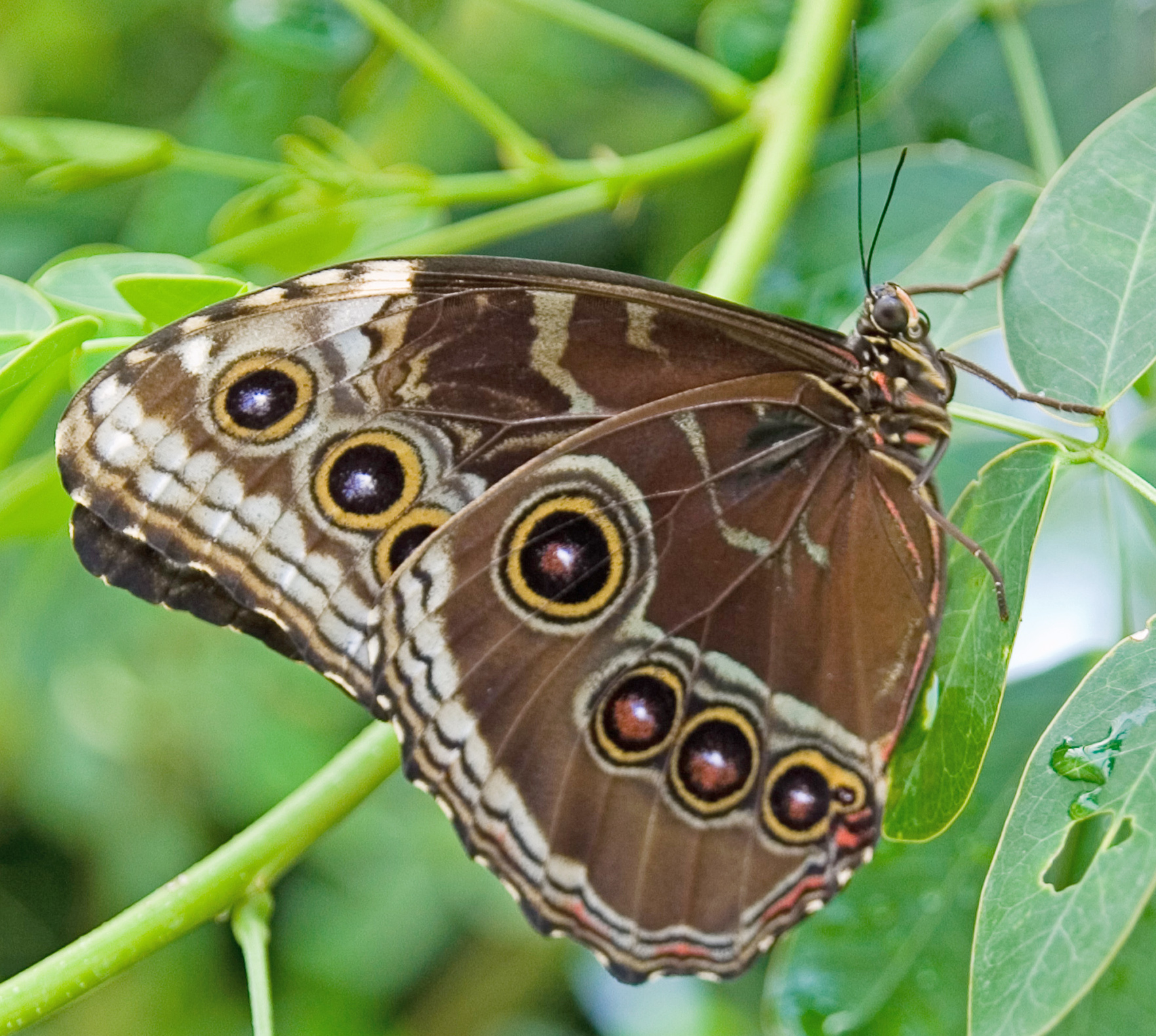
Ventral side of M. peleides

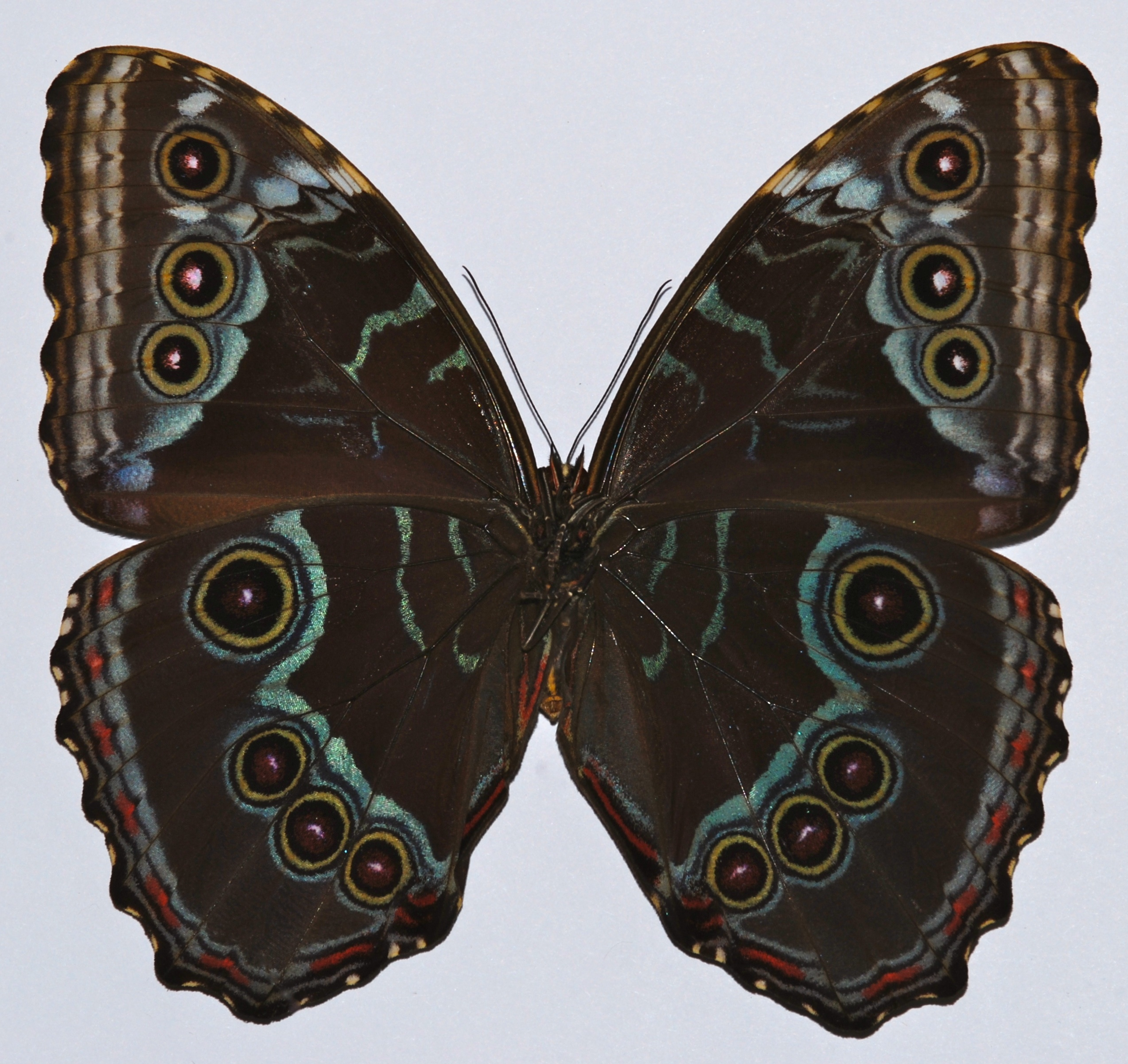
Ventral side of M. peleides
