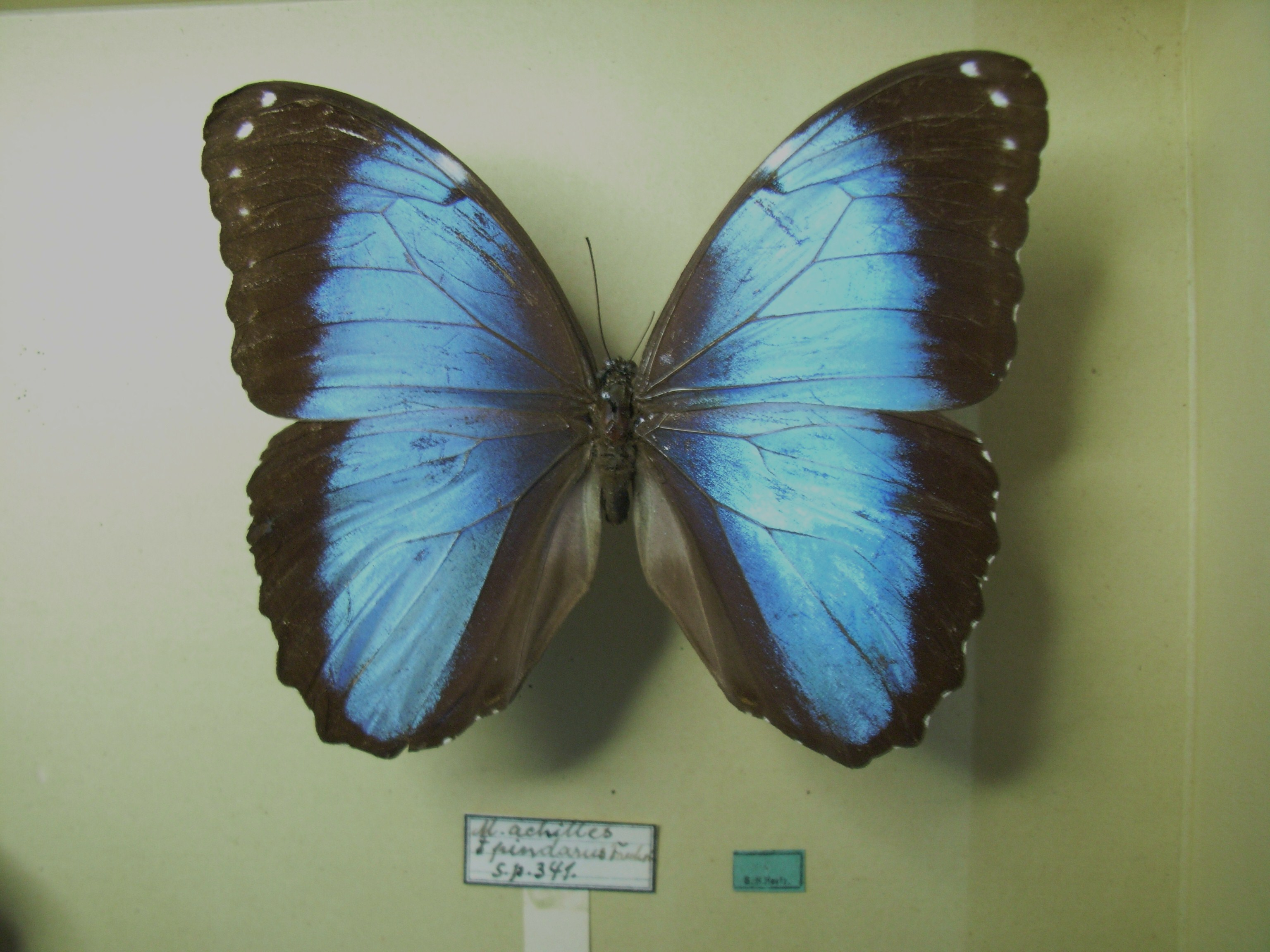
- Morpho helenor pindarus dorsal view
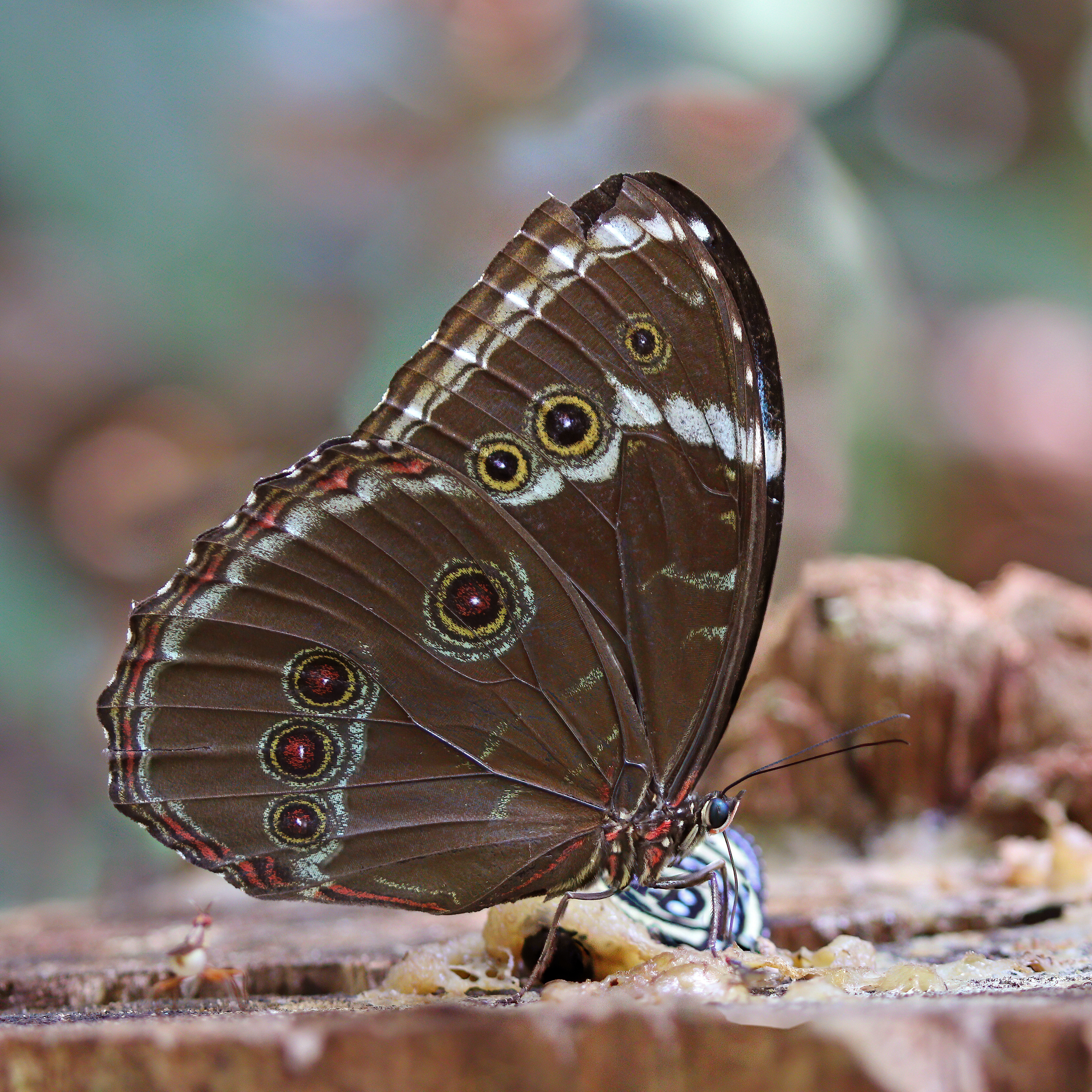
- Morpho helenor helenor ventral view

Scientific classification
- Kingdom: Animalia
- Phylum: Arthropoda
- Clade: Pancrustacea
- Class: Insecta
- Order: Lepidoptera
- Family: Nymphalidae
- Genus: Morpho
- Species: M. helenor

Binomial name
- Morpho helenor (Cramer, 1776)

Subspecies
- Many (see section below)

= Morpho helenor =

Helenor blue morpho

Species of butterfly

Morpho helenor, also known as the Helenor blue morpho or common blue morpho, is a Neotropical butterfly found throughout Central and South America from Mexico to Argentina. It is a species group that may or may not be several species. Many subspecies have been described.

== Biology ==
The larvae of subspecies Morpho helenor achillaena have been recorded as feeding on Genipa americana, Inga, Machaerium, Platymiscium, Wisteria, Trifolium, Arachis and Robinia.

== Subspecies ==
Listed alphabetically:

- M. h. achillaena (Hübner, [1823])
- M. h. achillides C. & R. Felder, 1867
- M. h. anakreon Fruhstorfer, 1910
- M. h. charapensis Le Moult & Réal, 1962
- M. h. coelestis Butler, 1866
- M. h. cortone Fruhstorfer, 1913
- M. h. corydon Guenée, 1859
- M. h. guerrerensis Le Moult & Réal, 1962
- M. h. helenor (Cramer, 1776)
- M. h. insularis Fruhstorfer, 1912
- M. h. leontius C. & R. Felder, 1867
- M. h. macrophthalmus Fruhstorfer, 1913
- M. h. maculata Röber, 1903
- M. h. marajoensis Le Moult & Réal, 1962
- M. h. marinita Butler, 1872
- M. h. montezuma Guenée, 1859
- M. h. narcissus Staudinger, 1887
- M. h. octavia Bates, 1864
- M. h. papirius Hopffer, 1874
- M. h. peleides Kollar, 1850 now also described in Morpho peleides
- M. h. peleus Röber, 1903
- M. h. pindarus Fruhstorfer, 1910
- M. h. popilius Hopffer, 1874
- M. h. rugitaeniatus Fruhstorfer, 1907
- M. h. telamon Röber, 1903
- M. h. theodorus Fruhstorfer, 1907
- M. h. tucupita Le Moult, 1925
- M. h. ululina Le Moult & Réal, 1962
- M. h. violaceus Fruhstorfer, 1912
- M. h. zonaras Fruhstorfer, 1912

== Gallery ==
Plate from Adalbert Seitz. Top left are Morpho helenor limpidus Butler, 1872, from Costa Rica and Morpho helenor hyacinthus Butler, 1866, from Honduras.

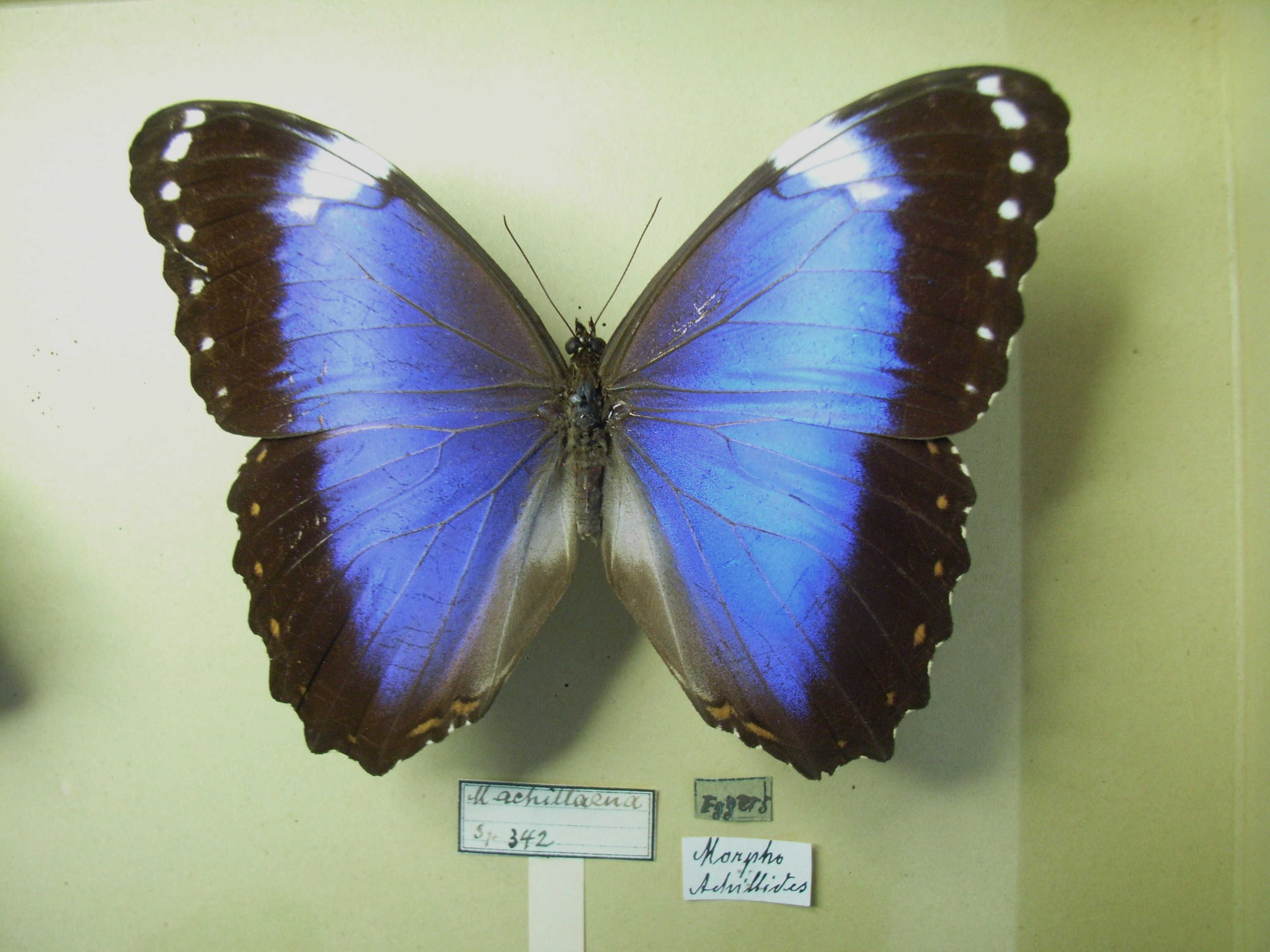
Morpho helenor achilleana

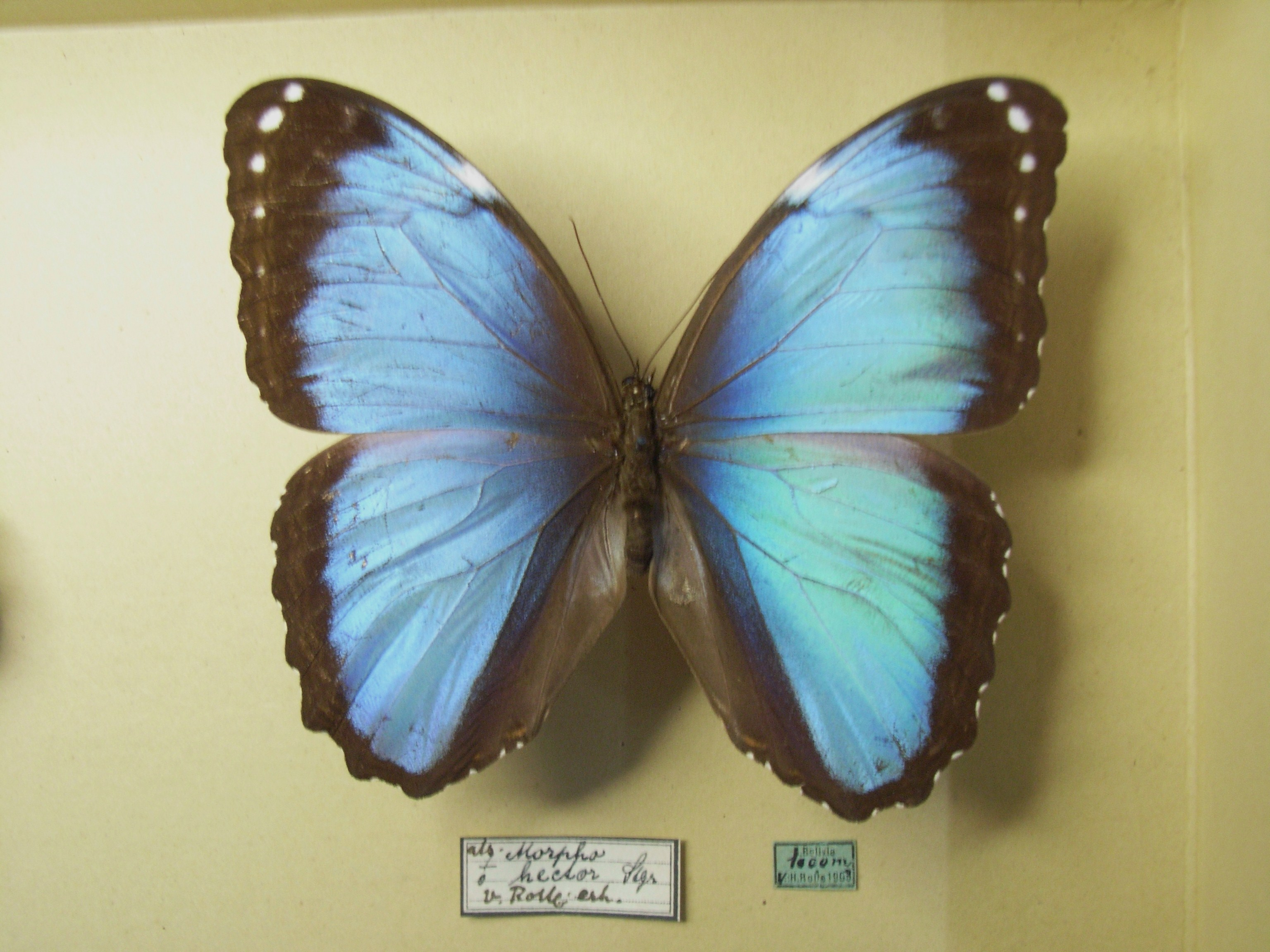
Morpho helenor hector

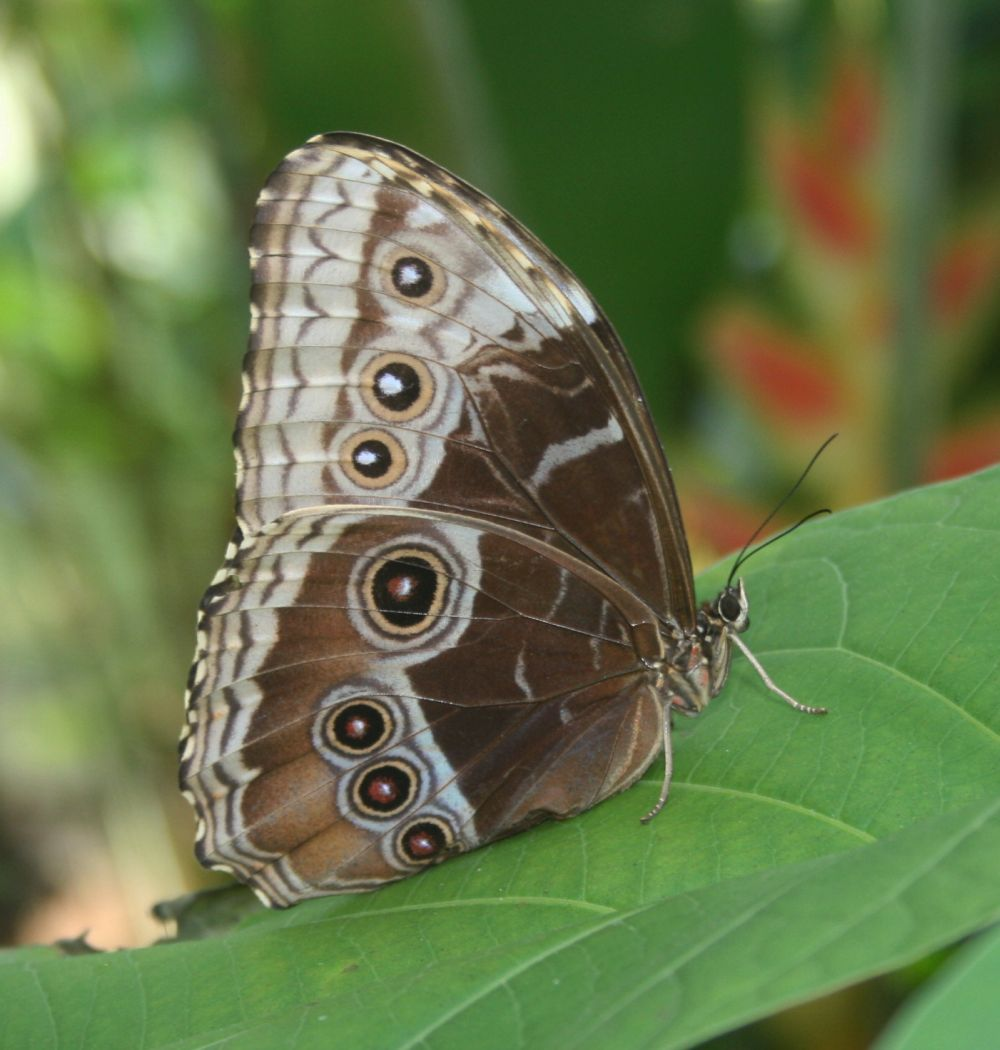
Morpho helenor marinita

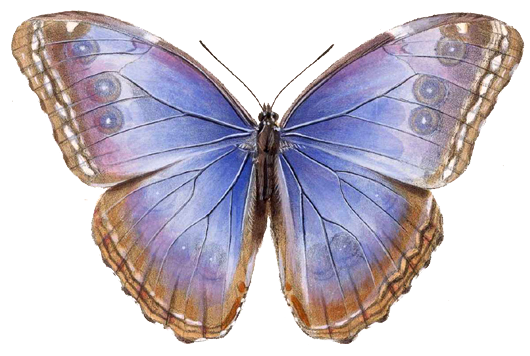
Morpho helenor octavia

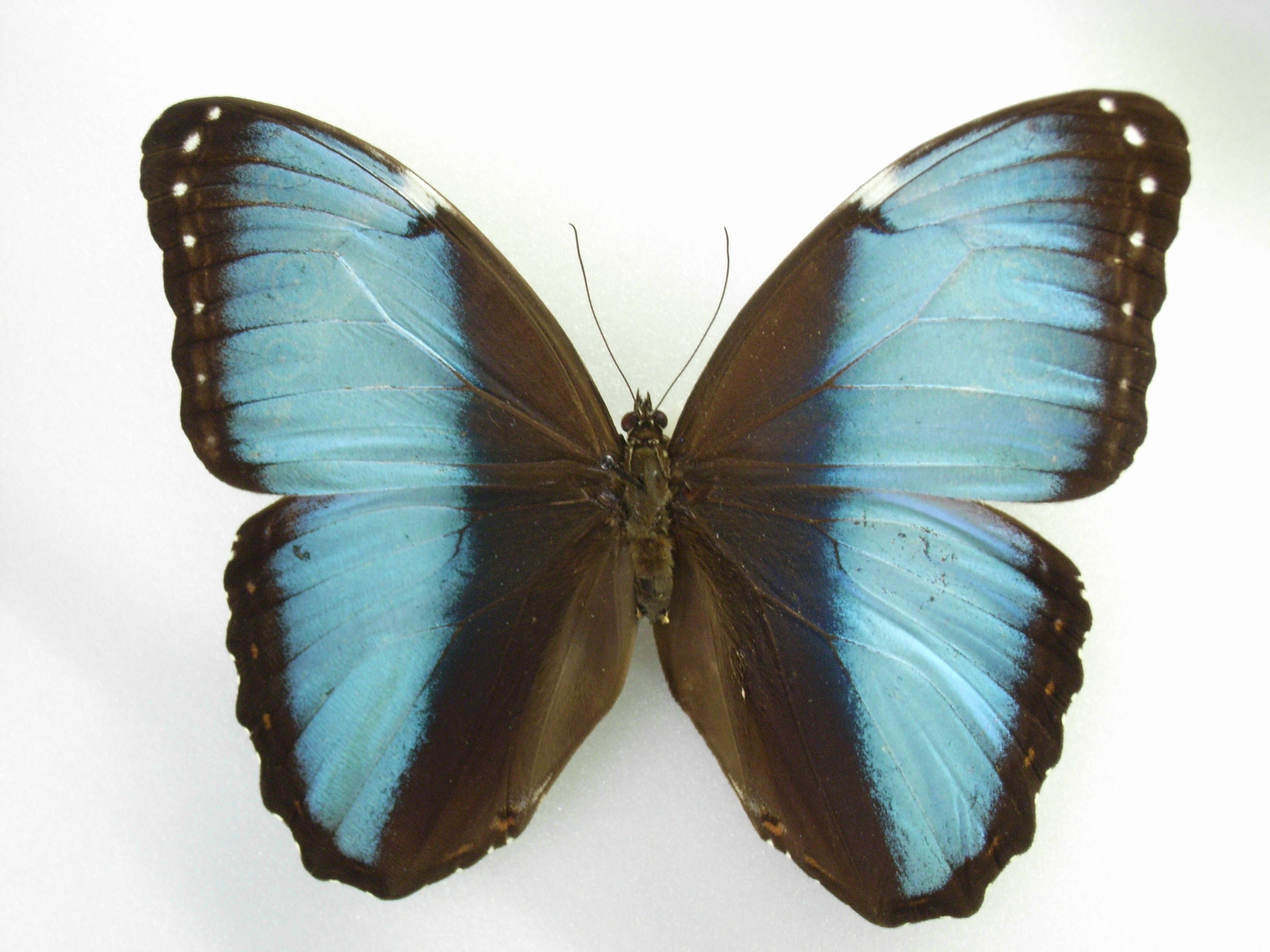
Morpho helenor papirius

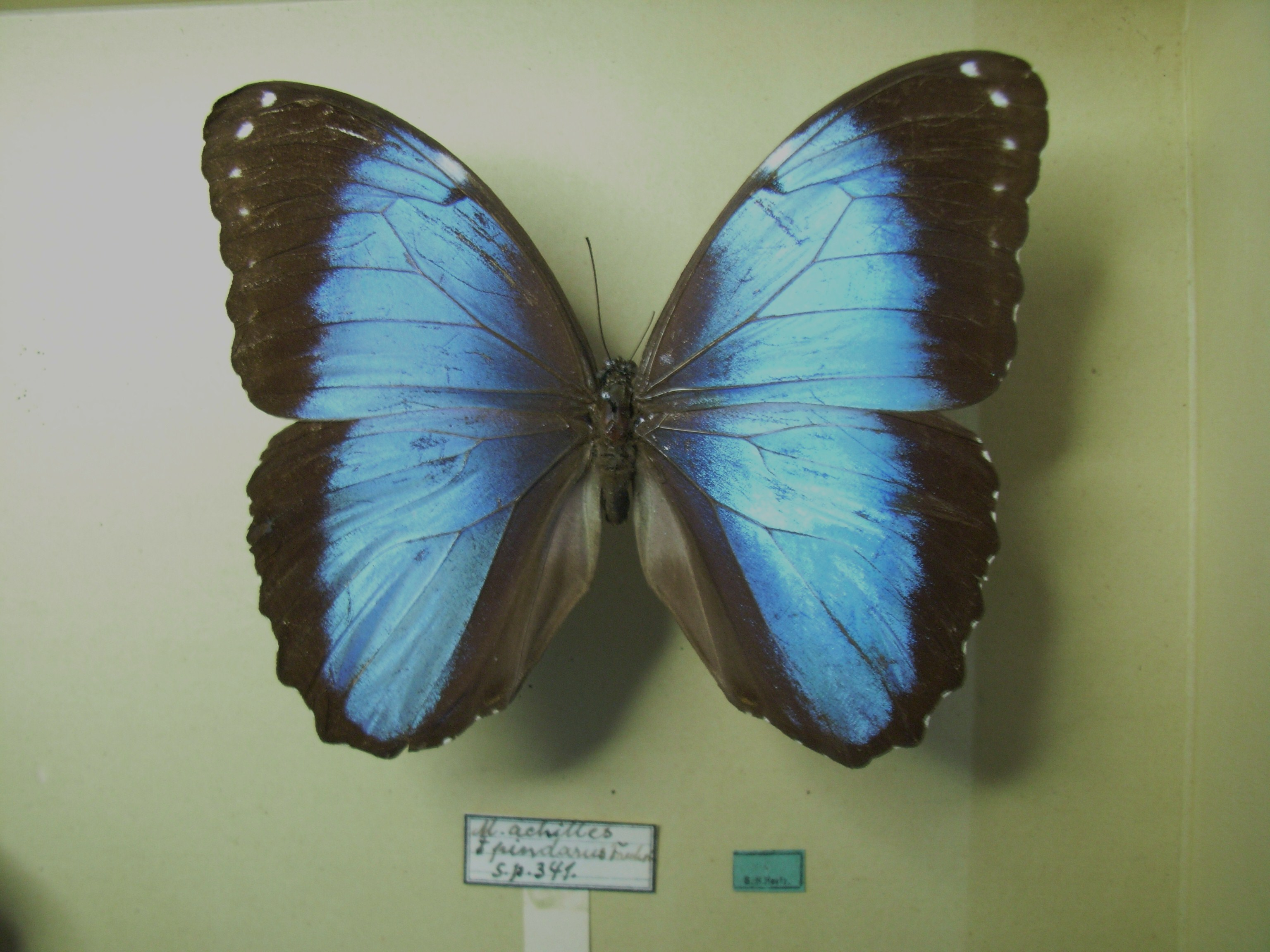
Morpho helenor pindarus

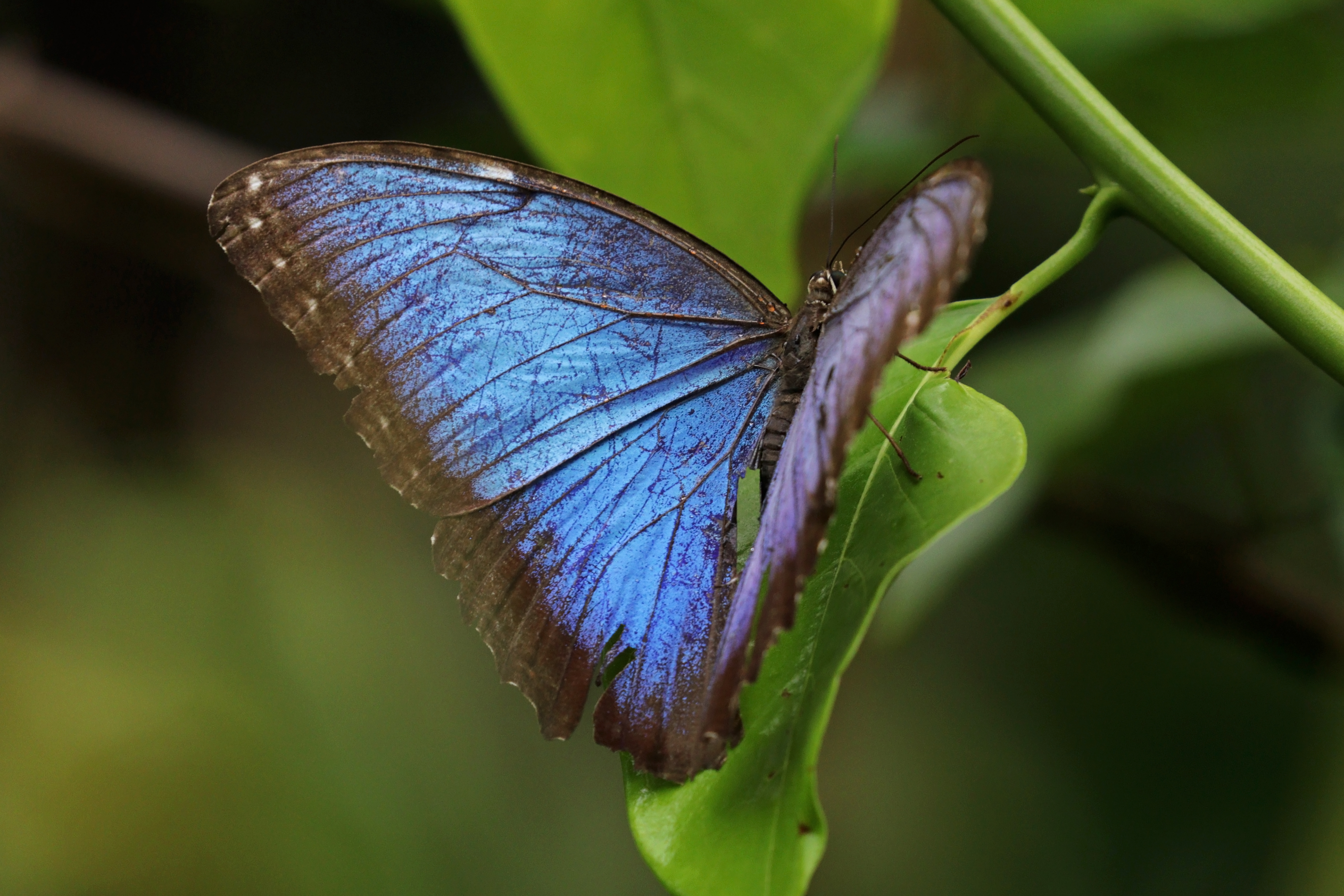
Morpho helenor peleides
Panama

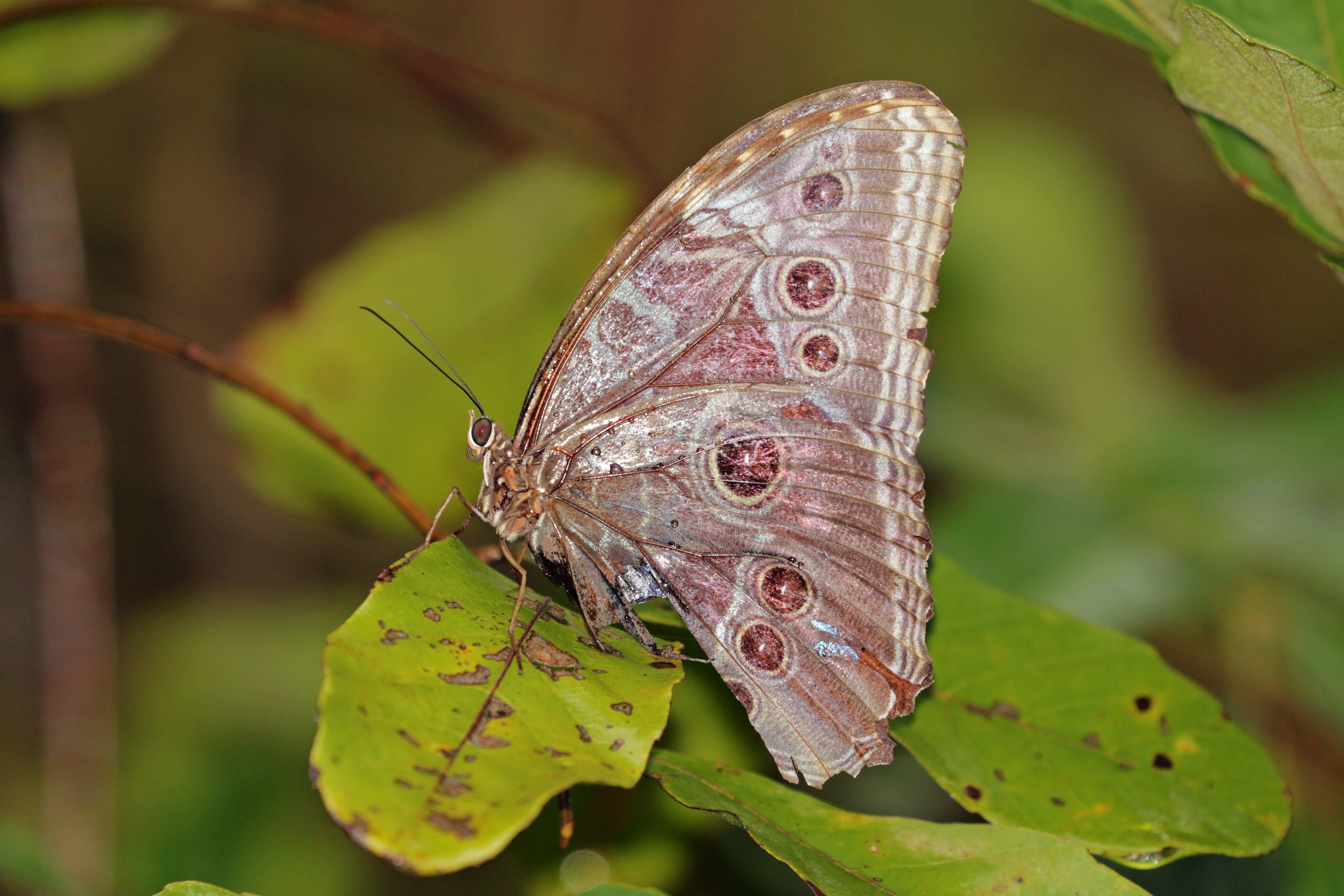
Morpho helenor peleides
Panama

=== Morpho helenor helenor ===
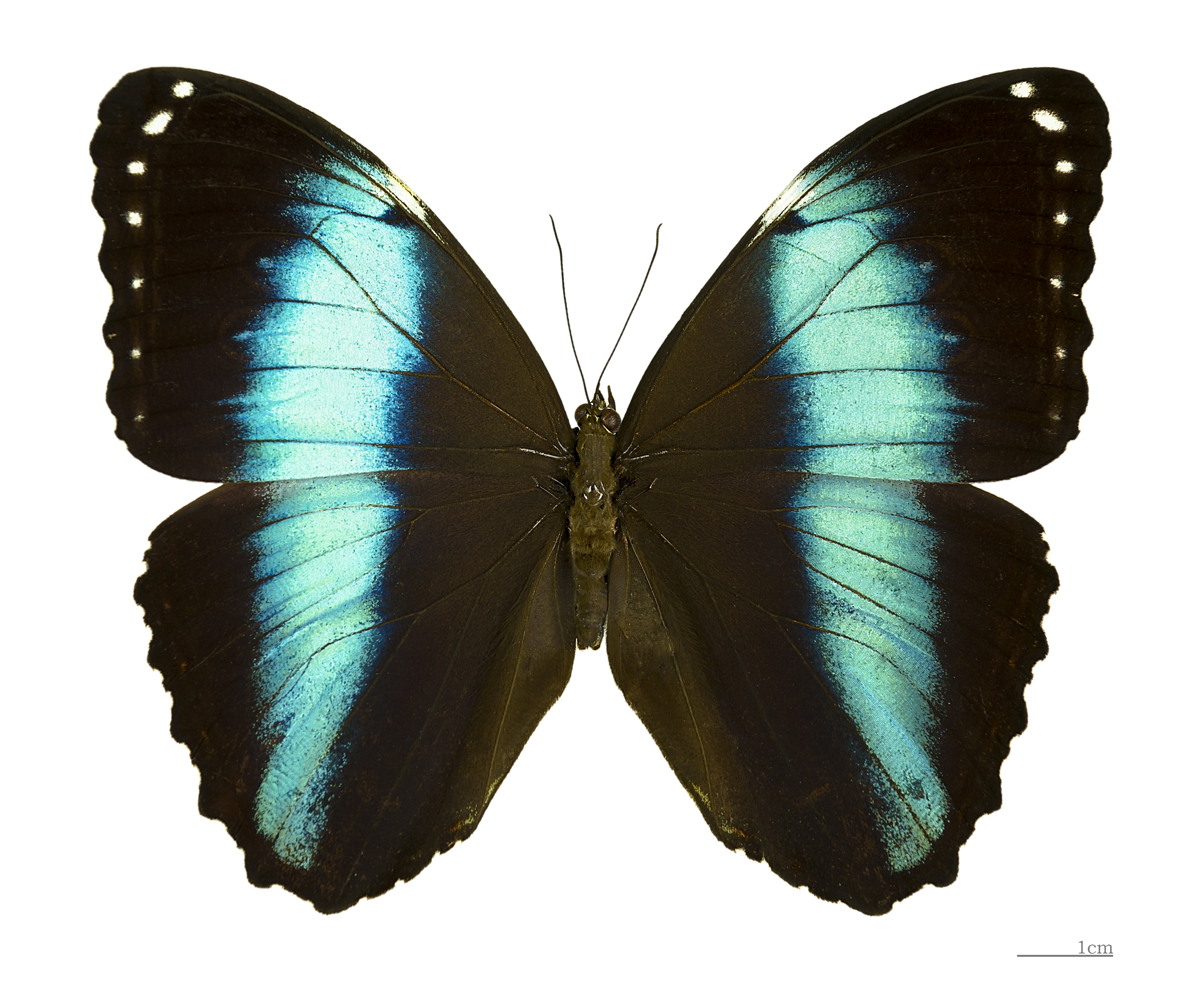
Morpho helenor helenor, male, dorsal - MHNT

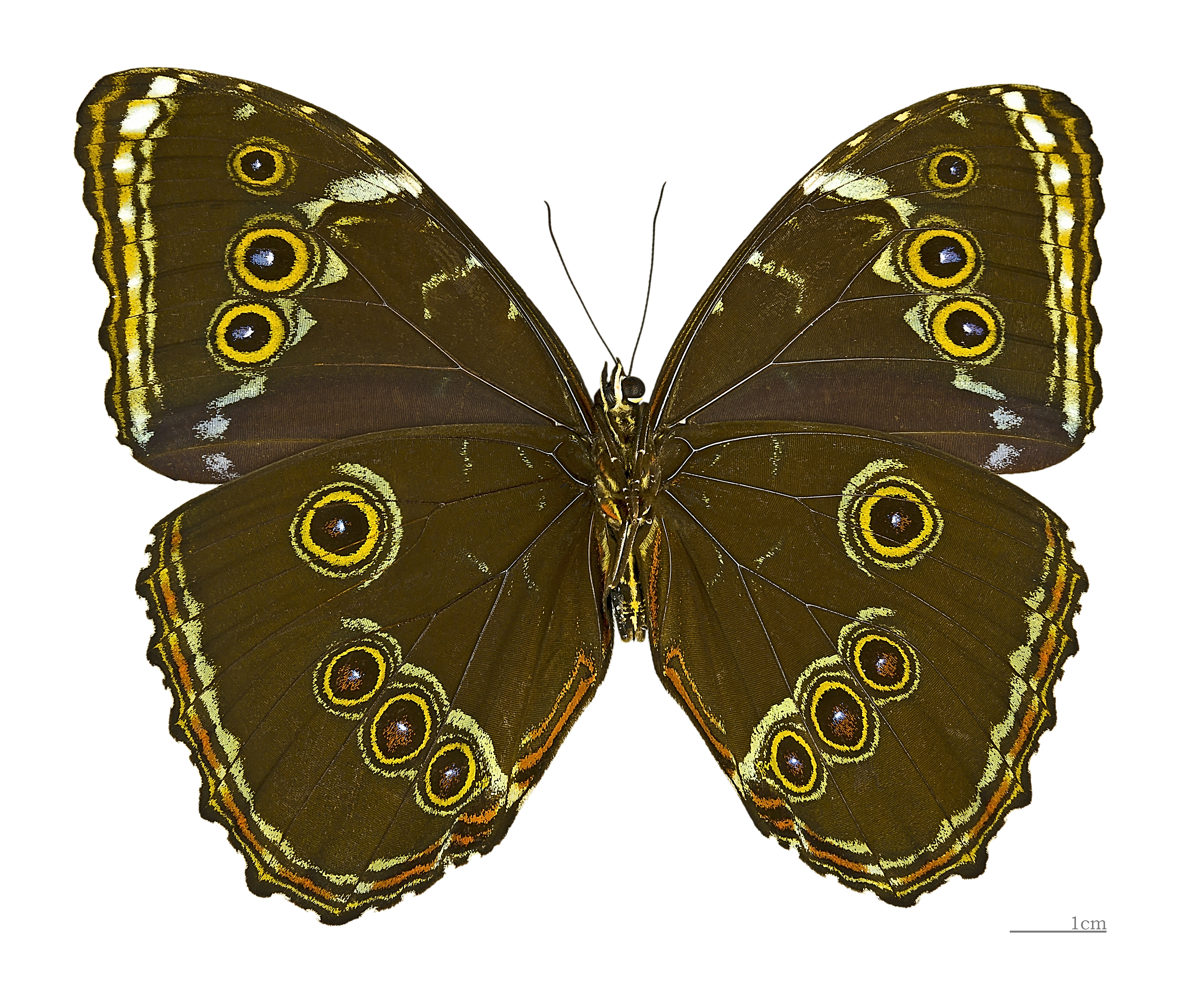
Morpho helenor helenor male, ventral - MHNT

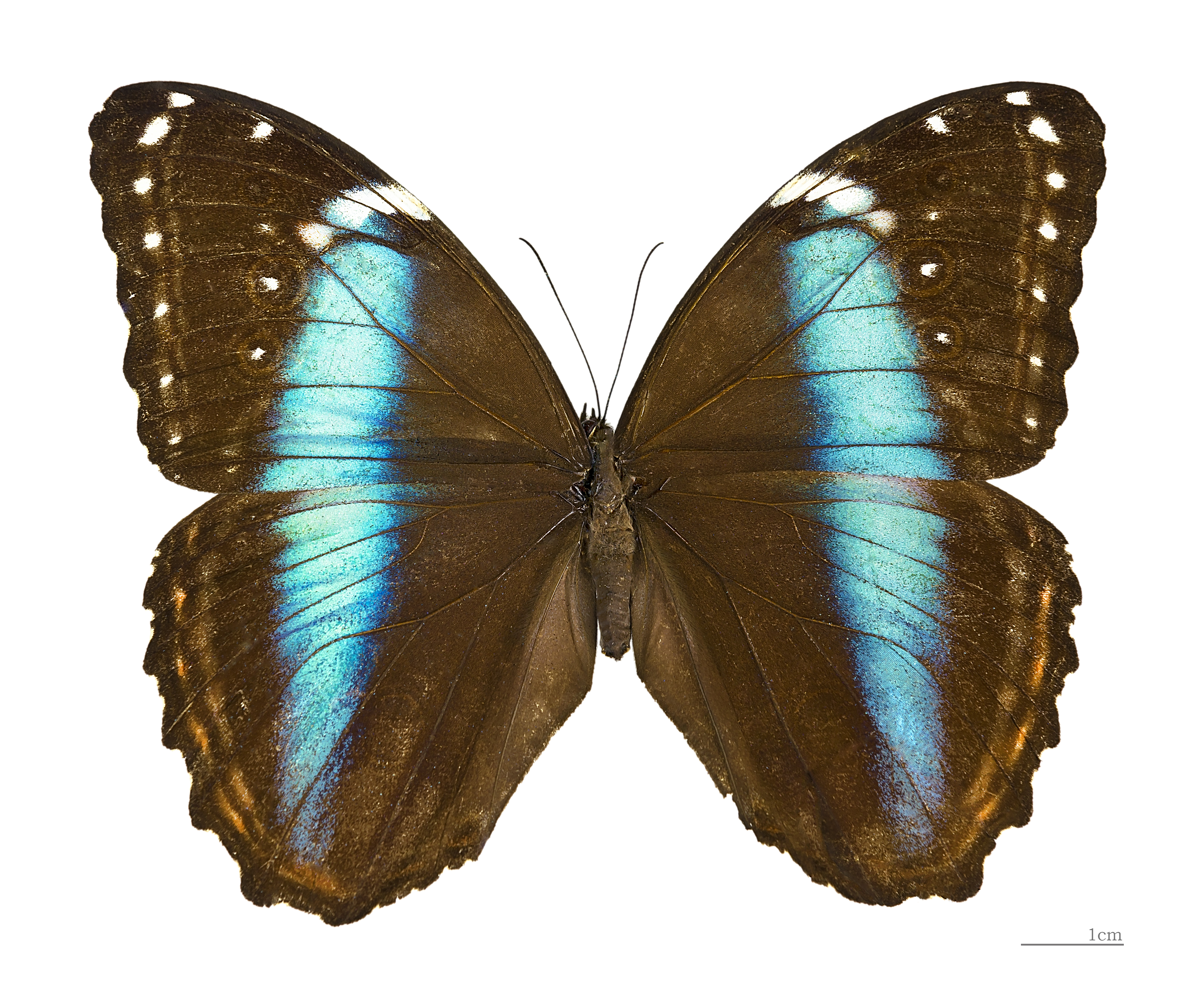
Morpho helenor helenor, female, dorsal - MHNT

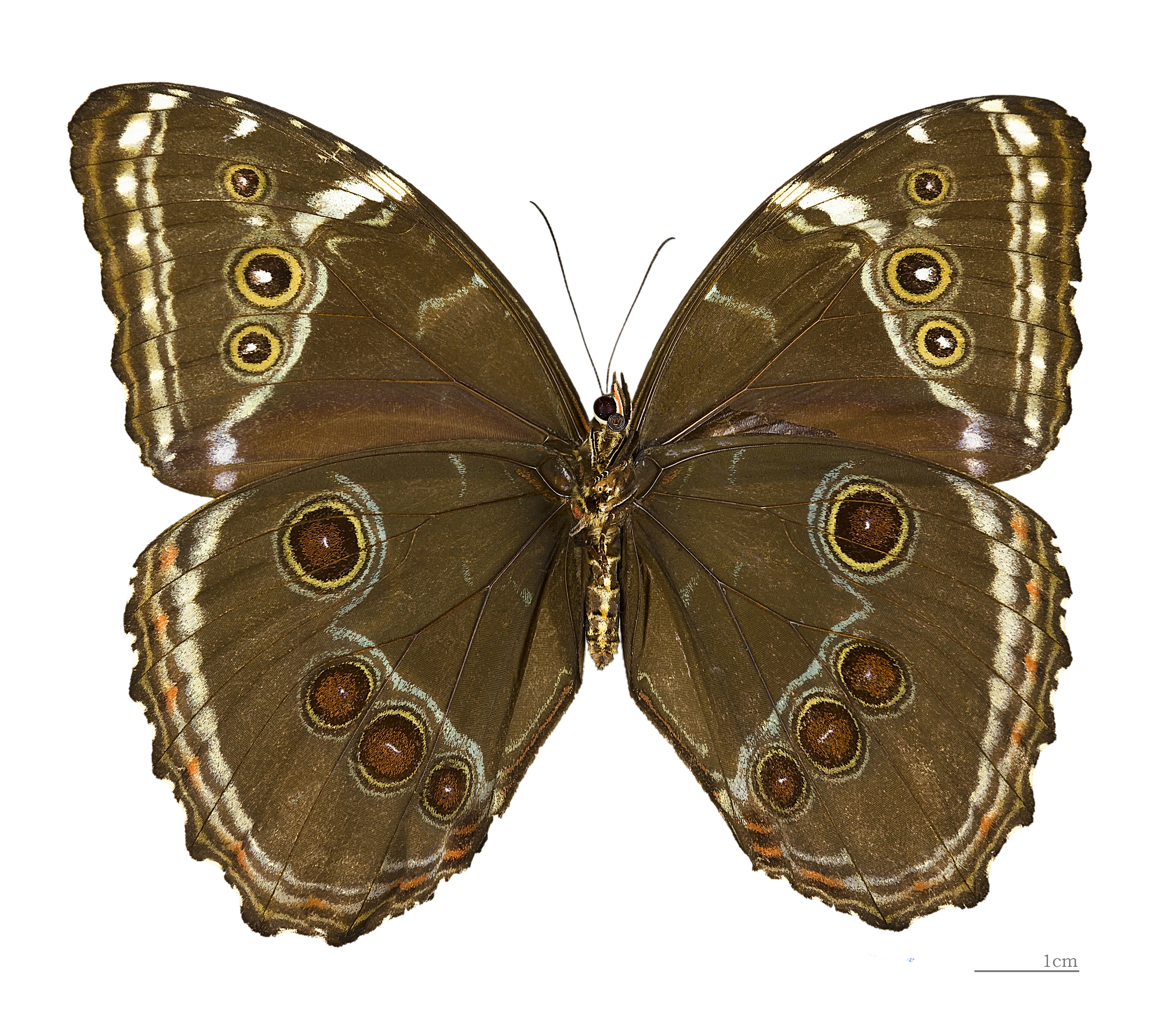
Morpho helenor helenor, female, ventral - MHNT

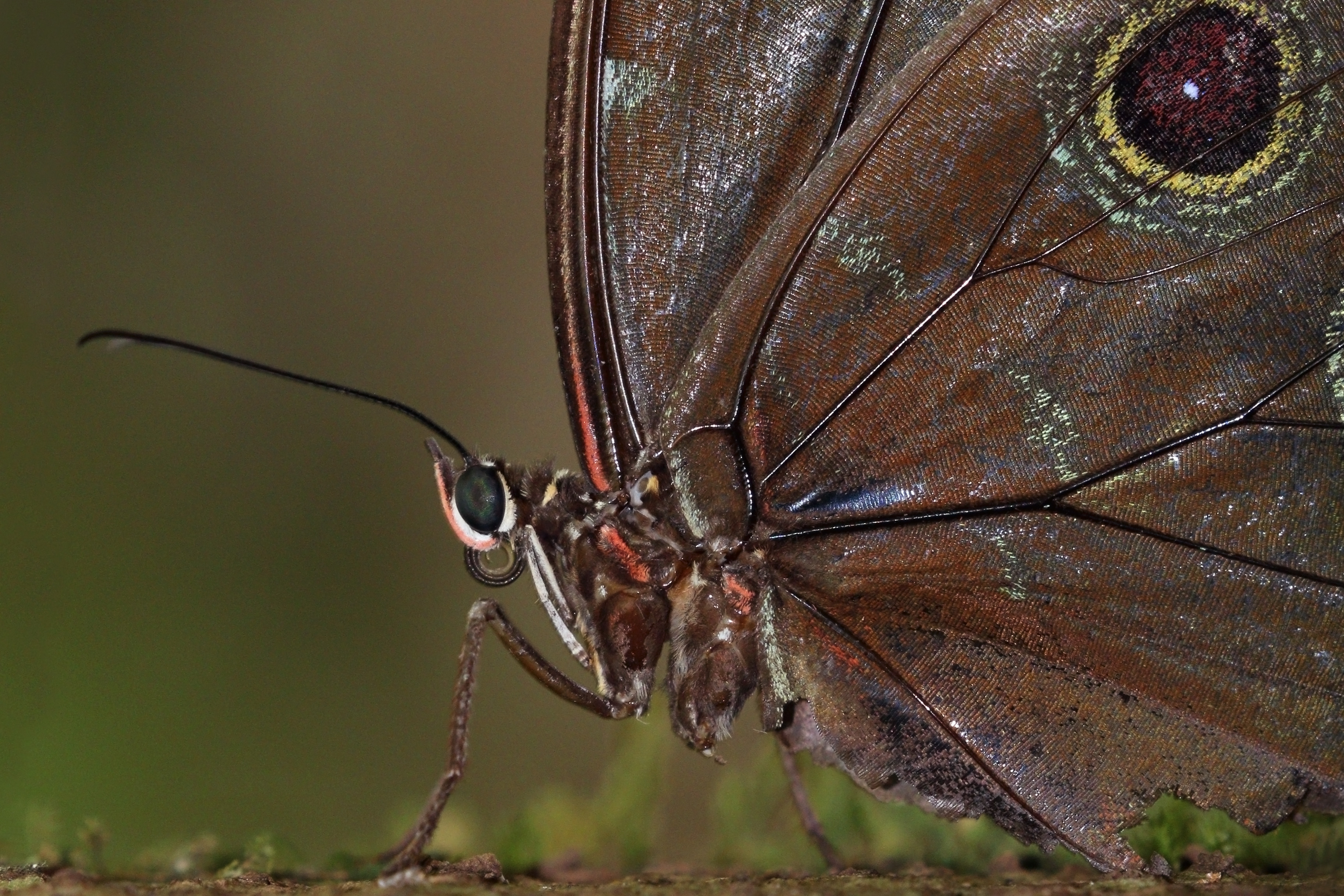
Morpho helenor helenor
