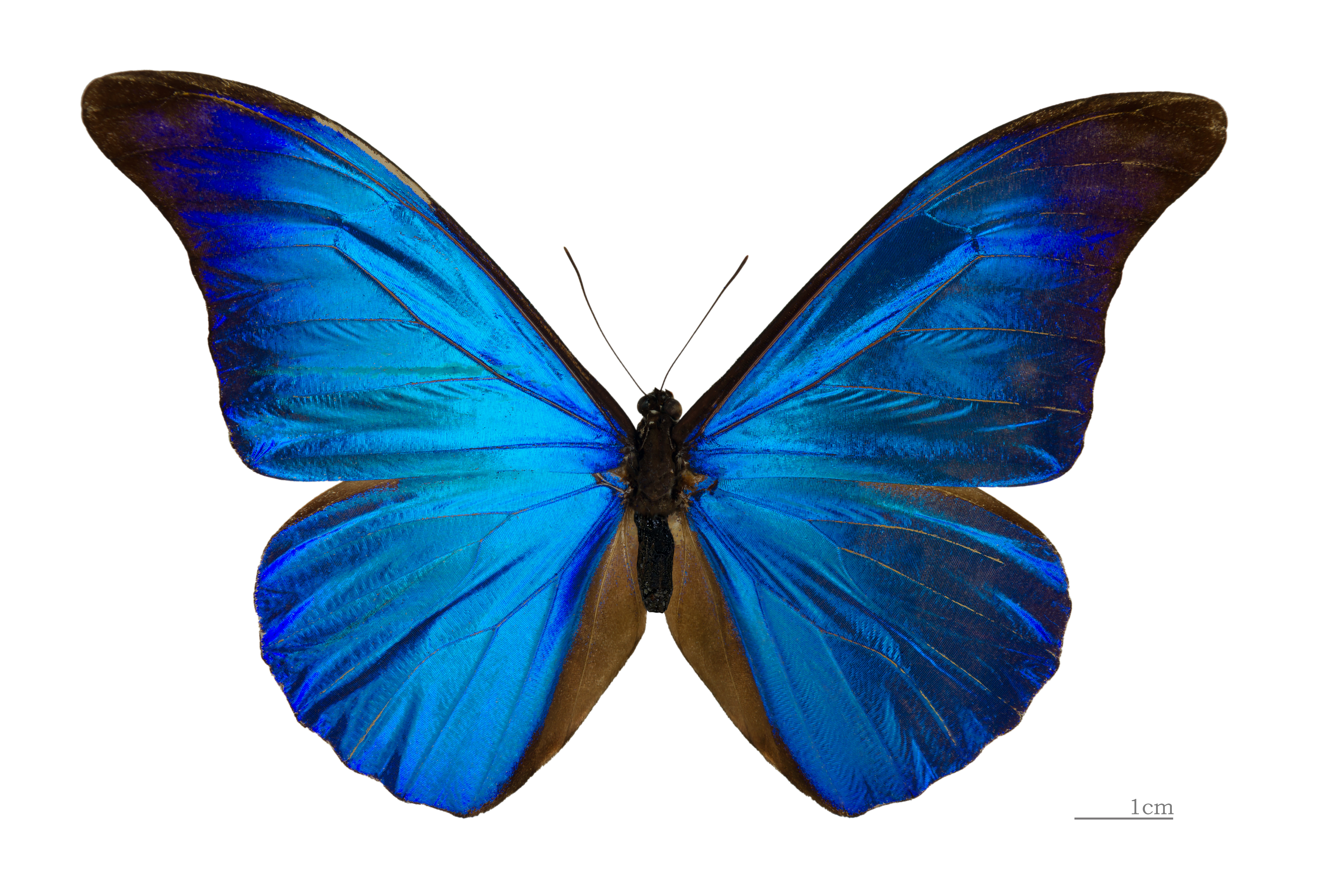
- Dorsal view of male (MHNT)
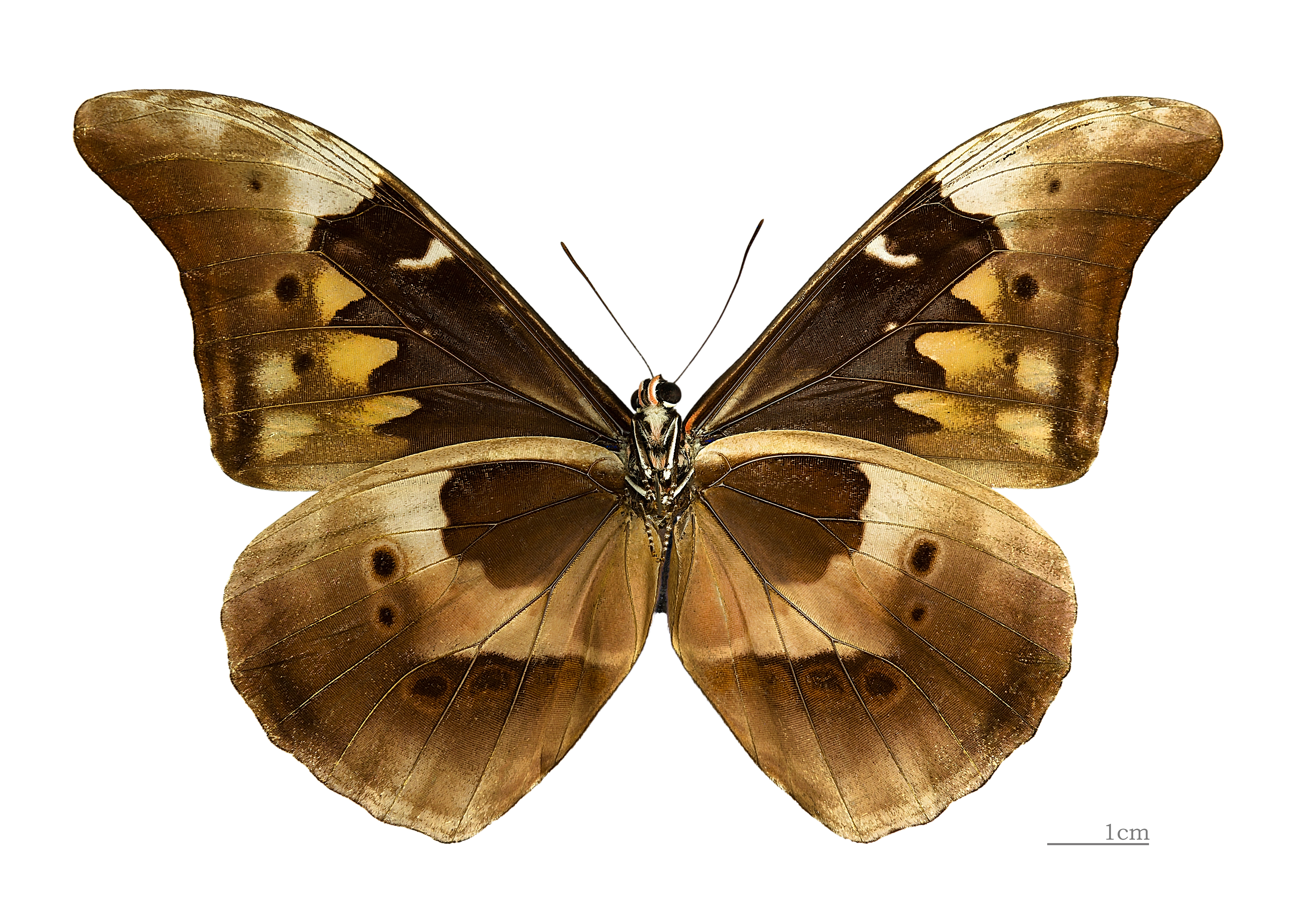
- Ventral view of the same specimen

Scientific classification
- Kingdom: Animalia
- Phylum: Arthropoda
- Clade: Pancrustacea
- Class: Insecta
- Order: Lepidoptera
- Family: Nymphalidae
- Genus: Morpho
- Species: M. rhetenor

Binomial name
- Morpho rhetenor (Cramer, 1775)

= Morpho rhetenor =

Rhetenor blue morpho

Species of butterfly

Morpho rhetenor, the Rhetenor blue morpho, is a Neotropical butterfly of the family Nymphalidae. It is found in Suriname, French Guiana, Brazil, Peru, Ecuador, Colombia, and Venezuela.

== Description ==
Hans Fruhstorfer describes: "M. rhetenor, already named by Cramer the 'blue elongate Atlas butterfly', has the apex of the forewing more produced than any other Morphid species; a characteristic, however, that partially disappears in the female, which more resembles that of cypris. The male is one of the most brilliantly glossy species and has only a quite inconsiderable black apical spot and a white costal patch on the forewing. The under surface is noteworthy for the contrast between the black basal area and a brown distal region, which are separated by a median band of a more or less pure white and of varying extent according to the locality. Both wings beneath show brown rounded eye-spots entirely without white pupils."

== Sex difference ==
Morpho rhetenor is sexually dimorphic. The female (shown in the Seitz plate below) is bigger than the bright blue male and has a dark-brown upperside with a lighter brown outer edge. There is a central yellow area tapering into a triangle and isolated patches as it crosses the forewings and a separate chain of yellow spots crosses the forewings and hindwings.

== Biology ==
The larva feeds on Palmae and Macrolobium bifolium.

== Behaviour ==
In 1913, Fruhstorfer wrote: "[forma] eusebes Fruhst. inhabits the Amazon region, where Michael has observed it at Obidos in August and September, and Dr. Hahnel at Iquitos and Jurimaguas. According to Dr. Hahnel (Iris 1890, p. 235) eusebes always flies at a great height and energetically, mounting from 3 to 6 m. with an undulating flight, and can only occasionally be attracted to fly down on to wings of Morpho menelaus laid on the ground. The female settles on wet places on the banks of rivers (a habit which I also observed in M. anaxibia in Sta. Catharina). When disturbed they only fly away slowly, in contrast to the males. The males emit a smell of sulphur (Hahnel 1.c. p. 308)."

== Etymology ==
Rhetenor is a literary reference. In Ovid's Metamorphoses, Rhetenor was a companion of Diomedes.

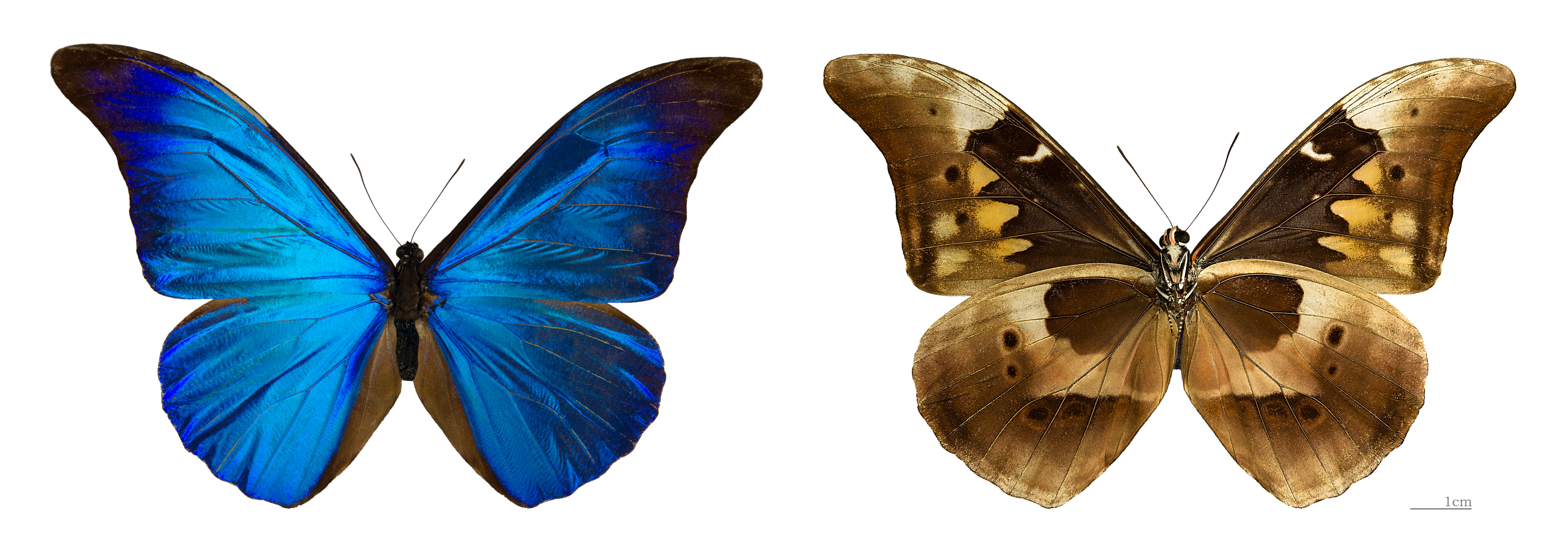
Dorsal and ventral sides

== Subspecies ==
- Morpho rhetenor rhetenor
- Morpho rhetenor cacica (Staudinger, 1876)
- Morpho rhetenor helena (Staudinger, 1890)
Plate from Seitz

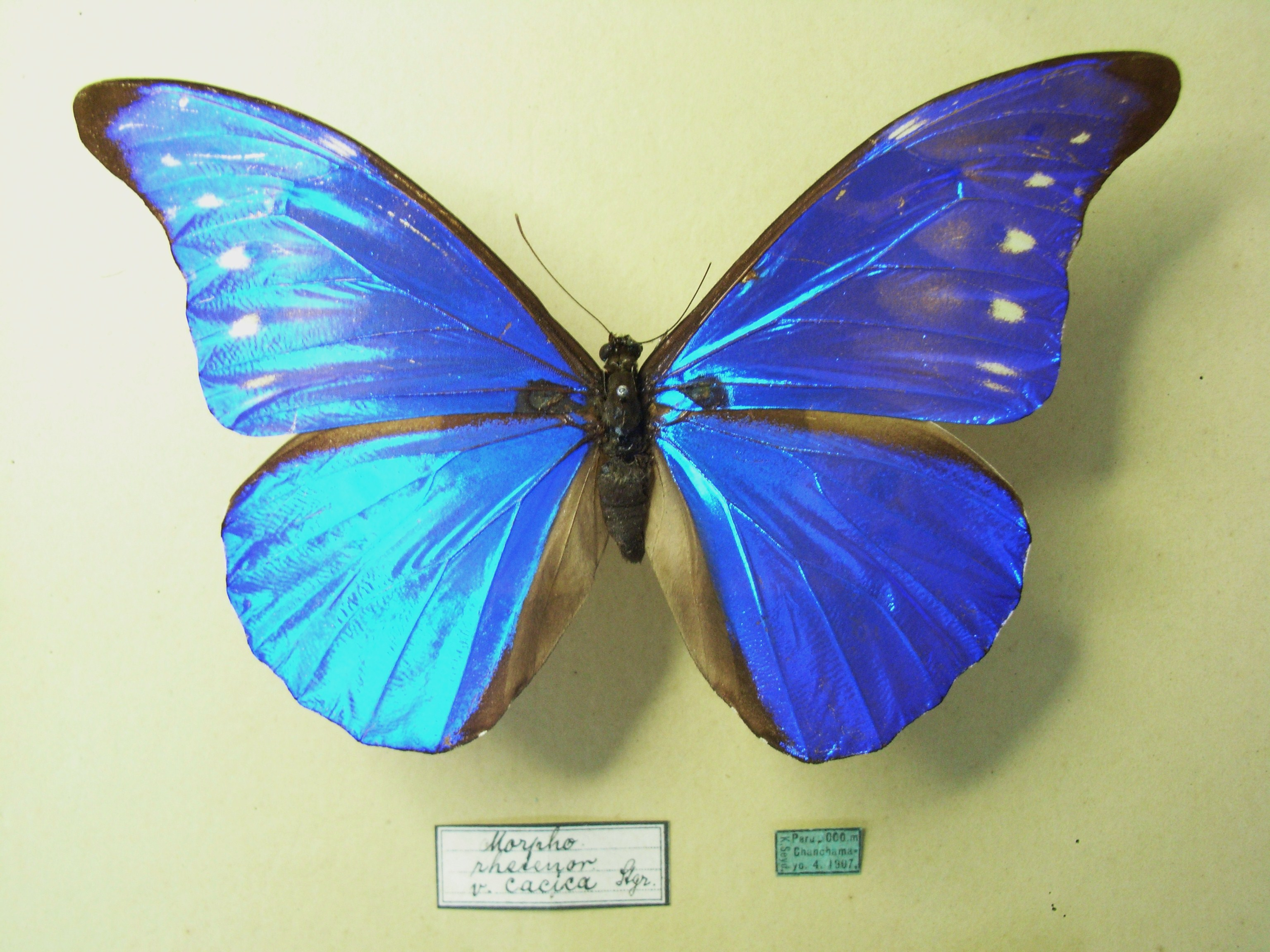
Morpho rhetenor cacica, Museum Wiesenbad
