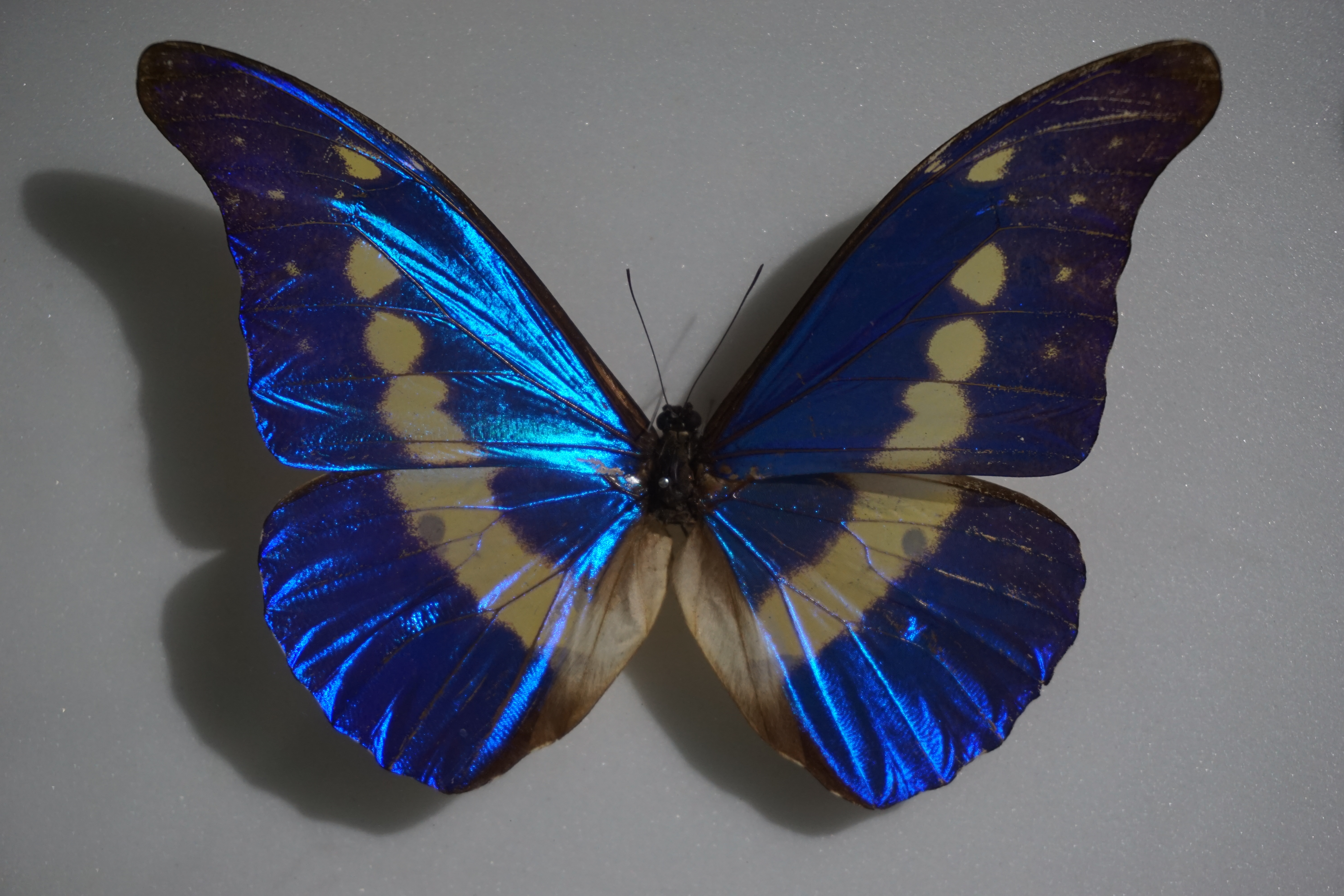
- Male Morpho helena in Shanghai Insect Museum

Scientific classification
- Domain: Eukaryota
- Kingdom: Animalia
- Phylum: Arthropoda
- Class: Insecta
- Order: Lepidoptera
- Family: Nymphalidae
- Genus: Morpho
- Species: M. helena

Binomial name
- Morpho helena Staudinger, 1890

= Morpho helena =

Species of butterfly

Morpho helena, the Helena morpho, is a Neotropical butterfly of the family Nymphalidae. It is found in the rainforests of northern South America.

The wingspan is 75 to 100 millimetres (3.0 to 3.9 in). It is known for its metallic blue and shiny wings. Many authorities consider Morpho helena a subspecies of Morpho rhetenor, and thus is sometimes named Morpho rhetenor helena.
