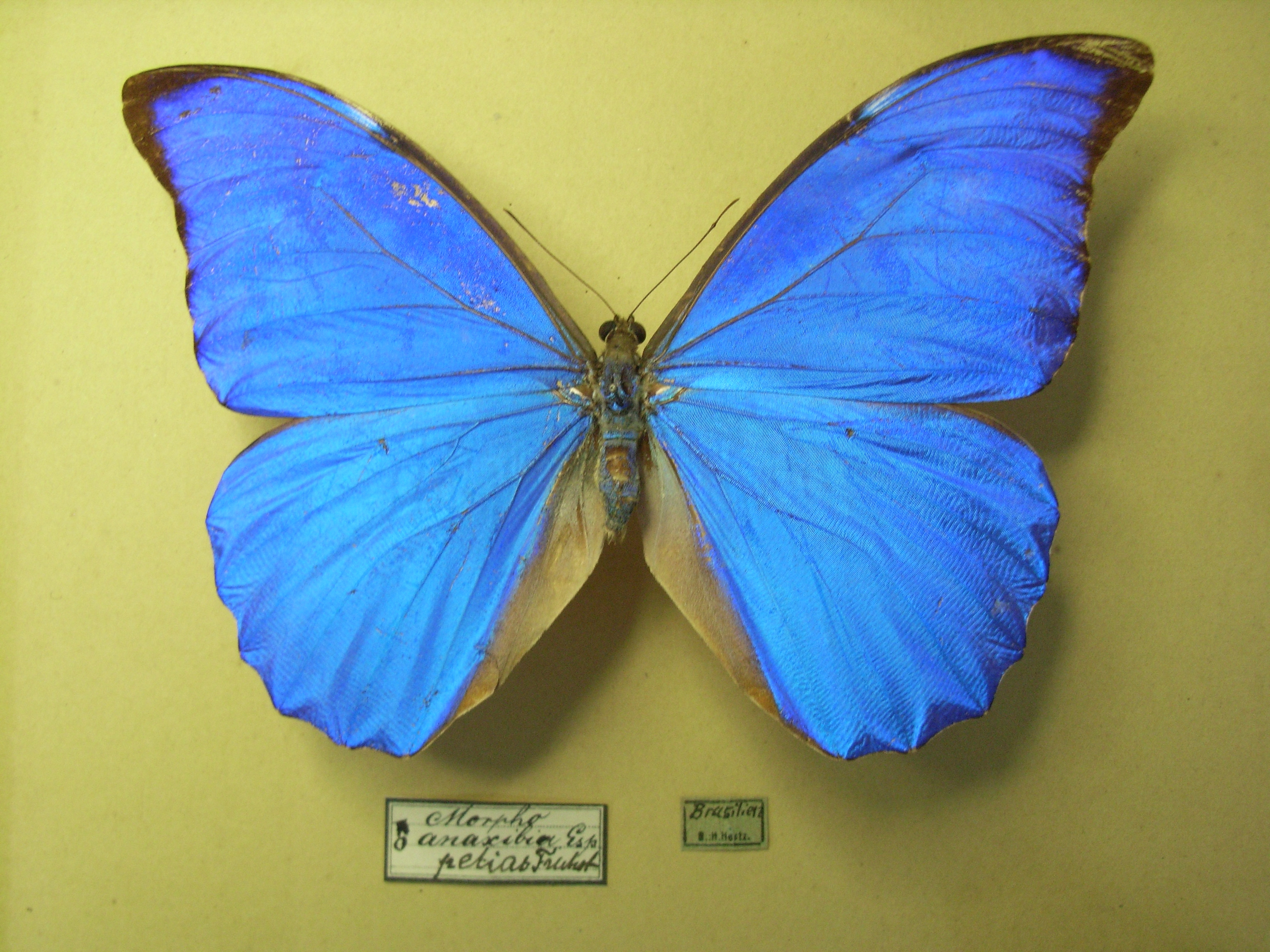
- Morpho anaxibia pelias
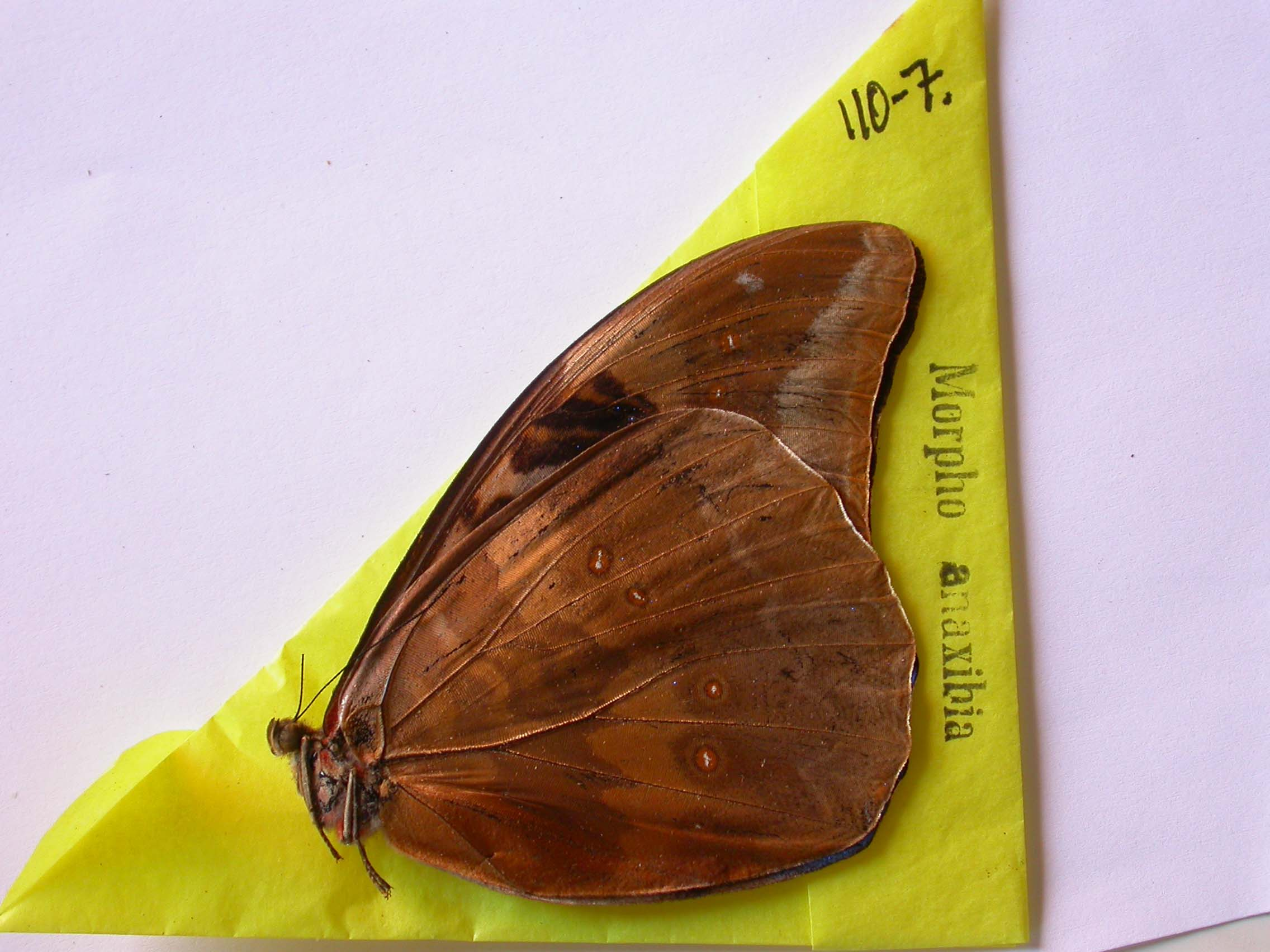
- Morpho anaxibia underside

Scientific classification
- Kingdom: Animalia
- Phylum: Arthropoda
- Class: Insecta
- Order: Lepidoptera
- Family: Nymphalidae
- Genus: Morpho
- Species: M. anaxibia

Binomial name
- Morpho anaxibia (Esper, 1801)

Subspecies
- Morpho anaxibia pelias Fruhstorfer, 1913; Morpho anaxibia calliphon Fruhstorfer, 1916

= Morpho anaxibia =

Anaxibia morpho

Species of butterfly

Morpho anaxibia, the Anaxibia morpho, is a species of Neotropical butterfly endemic to Brazil.

== Description ==
In 1913, Hans Fruhstorfer wrote: "M. anaxibia Esp. (69 c) may be regarded as one of the characteristic butterflies of southern Brazil. The species stands quite alone in having the abdomen blue above, but forms a transition from the rhetenor to the menelaus group, anaxibia, however, lacks the wonderful gloss of the rhetenor series, the blue is duller, although it has its own particular beauty, and the dazzling iridescence is wanting. The male still suggests rhetenor in the under surface, the female reveals more connection with the menelaus group, but its marginal spots are yellow instead of white. The male bears a narrow black costal border, which is inappreciably widened at the apex and then continued to the hinder angle of the forewing as a proximally more or less dentate distal border. Beyond the cell there is a white patch at the costal margin, but in examples from Blumenau this is frequently absent. The forewing is predominantly black beneath, the hindwing red-brown, respectively with two to three and four to five medium-sized eye-spots, slightly pupilled with white and mostly ringed with light grey-yellow. The under surface of the female is more variegated, marked with slightly glossy broad grey zigzag bands and patches. The female varies above in the white, delicately blue-dusted transcellular patch of the forewing, which may be composed of only one (Parana) or of three divisions."

— Larva on Canella and one of the Myrtaceae "Grumexama", elongate, appreciably thickened in the middle, head with two lateral, not very distinctly projecting tubercles with long bristles. Head shining yellowish horn-colour, covered with small rounded pitting and dots, with fine white hairs and with strong red-brown bristles. Body yellow, sides densely clothed with fine woolly hairs, back gaily coloured, the first two segments finely haired, on the third to the sixth segment long lateral tufts of bristles, then a varied mixture of black, bordeaux-red and white. The 5th and 6th segments naked, the 7th and 8th with a St. Andrew's cross-shaped figure, the four ends of which are adorned with gay tufts of bristles. Anus with two lateral bunches of bristles and the beginning of the last segment, like the anterior ones, armed with brightly coloured hairs. Over the back runs a rather broad band with the inner edge, distinct, the outer broken up into marbling. All the segments further with a double red lateral line. Underside with red-brown patches between the legs. Pupa posteriorly strongly swollen, short, light green with yellowish wing-cases and sharply defined yellow-white ring shortly behind the thickest part of the body. Head with two fine, pointed black horns; in general smaller, weaker, slighter than those of Morpho hercules Dalm. In the yellowish ring the pupa of anaxibia also differs from that of M. catenari MS Perty. In Sta. Catharina pupation takes place approximately from the 15th of January to the 1st of March."

== Behaviour ==
"According to Mabille it flies for 15–30 days at the end of January and beginning of February and the time of flight only occasionally extends to the end of March. I myself observed anaxibia in large numbers in Santa Catharina, in February, particiuarly in a side valley of the Capivary River. Here a crystal waterfall sprinkled the roots of the forest giants and thus provided a centre of attraction for butterflies" of all sorts. As a wild beast seeks out certain set tracks in order to reach the water, so anaxibia also haunts this spot daily, following up accidental clearings in order to gain the cascade, as if they also sought there for cooling refreshment among the softly rustling arches of the tall bamboos shaken and bedewed by the foaming water. They did not arrive in companies but singly, sailing quietly along, but nevertheless after heavy rain the sand-banks before the rocks of the river were strewed with the glittering blue wings of dead anaxibia and aegea which the water washed up. The female is extraordinarily rare and on hot days rests in the morning hours with the wings closed in wet places in the forest-paths where it can imbibe the moisture. It is then so well concealed by the red under surface, which differs but little from the surrounding ground, that it is usually only noticed by the collector when it is too late. According to von Bonninghausen anaxibia is common in March on the Coreovado."

== Subspecies ==
Two subspecies have been described:

- Morpho anaxibia pelias Fruhstorfer, 1913
- Morpho anaxibia calliphon Fruhstorfer, 1916

== Larval food plants ==
Larvae have been recorded feeding on a wide range of plants: Canellaceae, Guttiferae, Erythroxylaceae, Myrtaceae, Moraceae and Lauraceae.

== Etymology ==
Anaxibia was the daughter of Bias and Iphianassa in Greek mythology. She married Pelias, the name given to one of the two subspecies.
