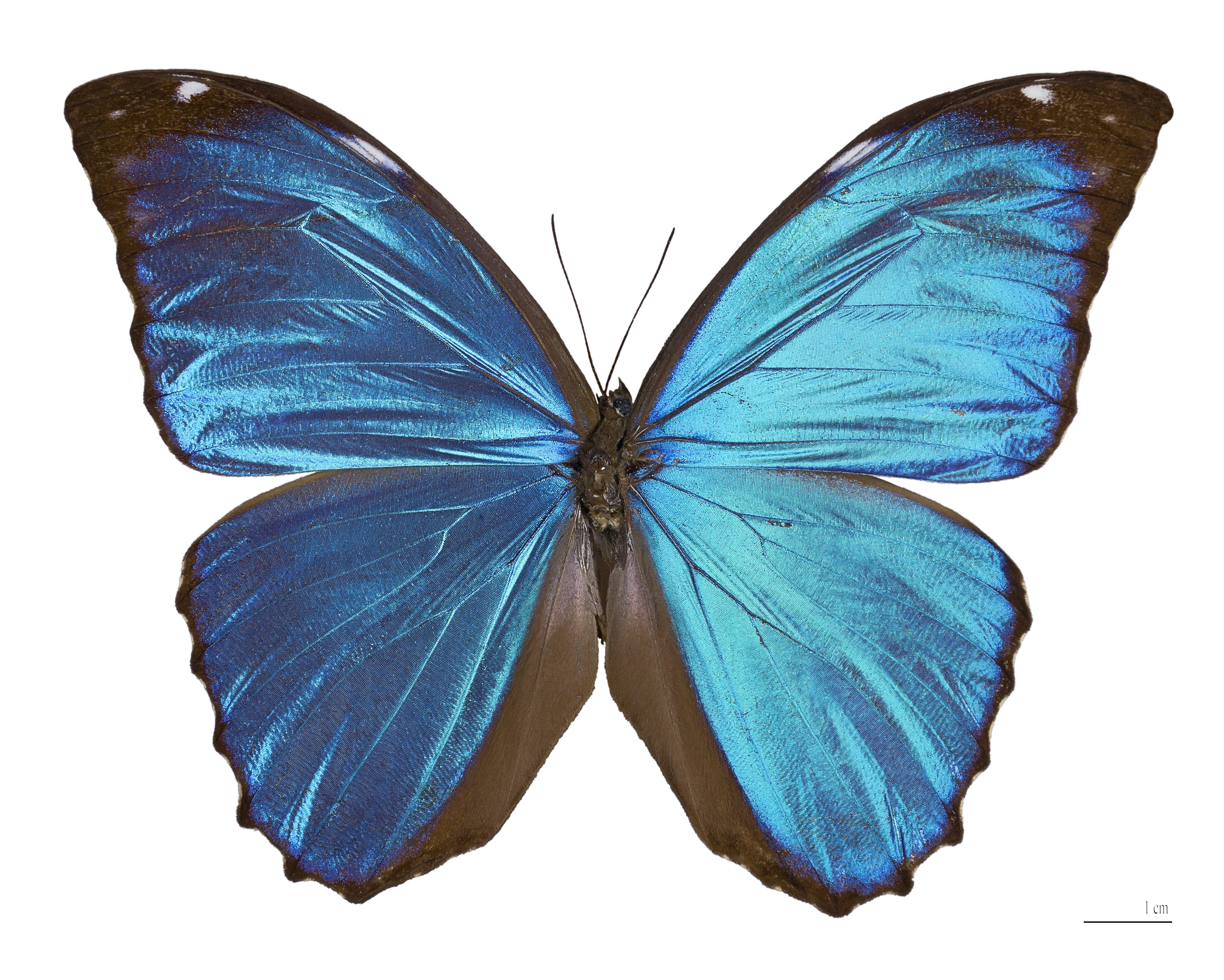

Scientific classification
- Kingdom: Animalia
- Phylum: Arthropoda
- Clade: Pancrustacea
- Class: Insecta
- Order: Lepidoptera
- Family: Nymphalidae
- Genus: Morpho
- Species: M. menelaus

Binomial name
- Morpho menelaus (Linnaeus, 1758)

= Morpho menelaus =

Menelaus blue morpho

Species of butterfly

The Menelaus blue morpho (Morpho menelaus) is one of 30 species of butterfly in the subfamily Morphinae. Its wingspan is about 12 cm (4.7 in), and its dorsal forewings and hindwings are a bright, iridescent blue with black edges, while the ventral surfaces are brown. Its iridescent wings are an area of interest in research due to their unique nanostructure. Due to its characteristic blue color, Morpho menelaus is considered valuable among collectors and was widely hunted in the 20th century.

== Range ==
This neotropical butterfly is found in Central and South America, including the Cerrado which is a vast tropical savanna in Brazil. Other locations include Mexico and Venezuela. Ancestors of the Morpho menelaus butterfly may have been distributed in the Andean regions. Morpho menelaus is one of the six species of Morpho in Costa Rica. The genus of Morpho is present in regions beginning in Mexico and throughout South America, except Chile. Moreover, the Morpho menelaus struggle to survive in the northern Pacific area of Costa Rica since they can’t tolerate such dry conditions. They also need habitats in old growth forests with proper differentiation between the understories and canopies (Murillo-Hiller & Canet, 2018).

== Phylogeny ==
There is great variation among the various species of Morpho. Two groups of Morpho butterflies, achilles and hecuba, are distinct in flight behavior and vertical forest distribution. This habitat stratification between the two forest levels may have led to the diversification of the Morpho butterflies. Flight pattern behavior may also have led to changes in the wing shape to make it more suitable for gliding or flapping. Phylogenetic studies suggest these are indicative of ancestral qualities.

Morpho menelaus is part of the achilles subclade of Morpho. Within this species, there are no differences between males and females regarding forewing length, aspect ratio and wing centroid measurement which may be indicative of morphological homogeneity. Despite the popularity of the genus Morpho, there is not a general consensus on the number of species or on how these species are defined. For instance, some consider M. amanthonte a subspecies of Morpho melanus, but this is not supported by morphology. Some older studies have identified 75 Morpho species, and newer studies recognize about 30 species. Despite the many species of the Morpho butterfly displayed in collections, they usually have mismatched or missing abdomens which make it difficult for research. Using combined studies of parsimony and Bayesian analyses, Morpho melanus is associated with the M. helenor, M. sulkowskyi and M. amonthonte clades. The split of Morpho melanus from M. amonthonte is estimated to fall under the Pliocene era.

=== Related Species ===
- M. achilles
- M. achillaena
- M. peleides
- M. granadensis
- M. deidamia
- M. laertes
- M. polyphemus
- M. catenarius
- M. amathonte
- M. didius
- M. godartii

== Behavior ==
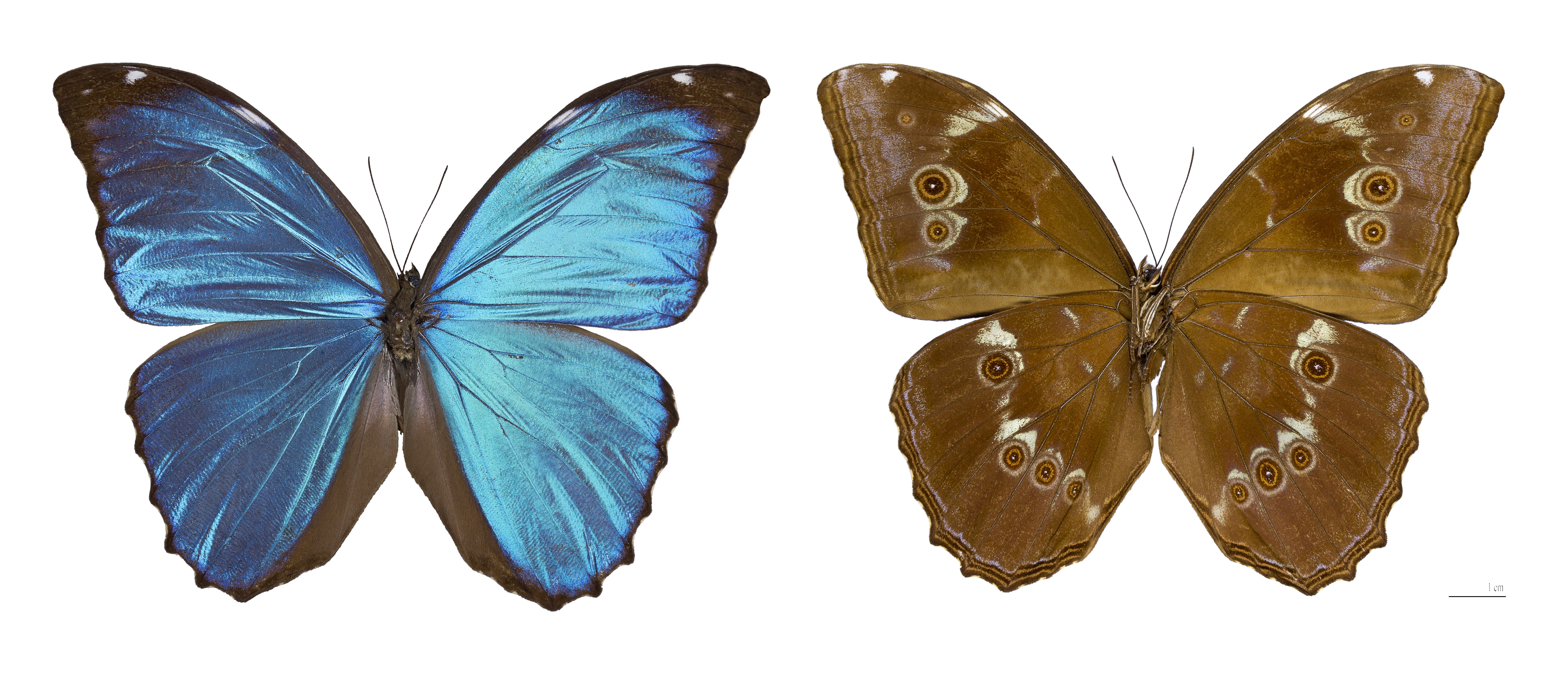
Two views (dorsal and ventral) of the same specimen

Females inhabit the forest understory and perch on tree stumps, but are found near the tree tops when it is time to lay eggs. Both sexes have a slow and floppy flight pattern and feed on rotting fruit that has dropped to the ground. Males tend to fly in open clearings or high in the canopy. These butterflies collectively emerge in the beginning and the end of the wet season in Cerrado. They do not appear in the middle of the wet season because the heavy rain can cause physical harm to their wings. Their emergence depends on the availability of food which is dependent on climate. For protection from the rain, Morpho menelaus prefers small and enclosed spaces.

== Life cycle ==
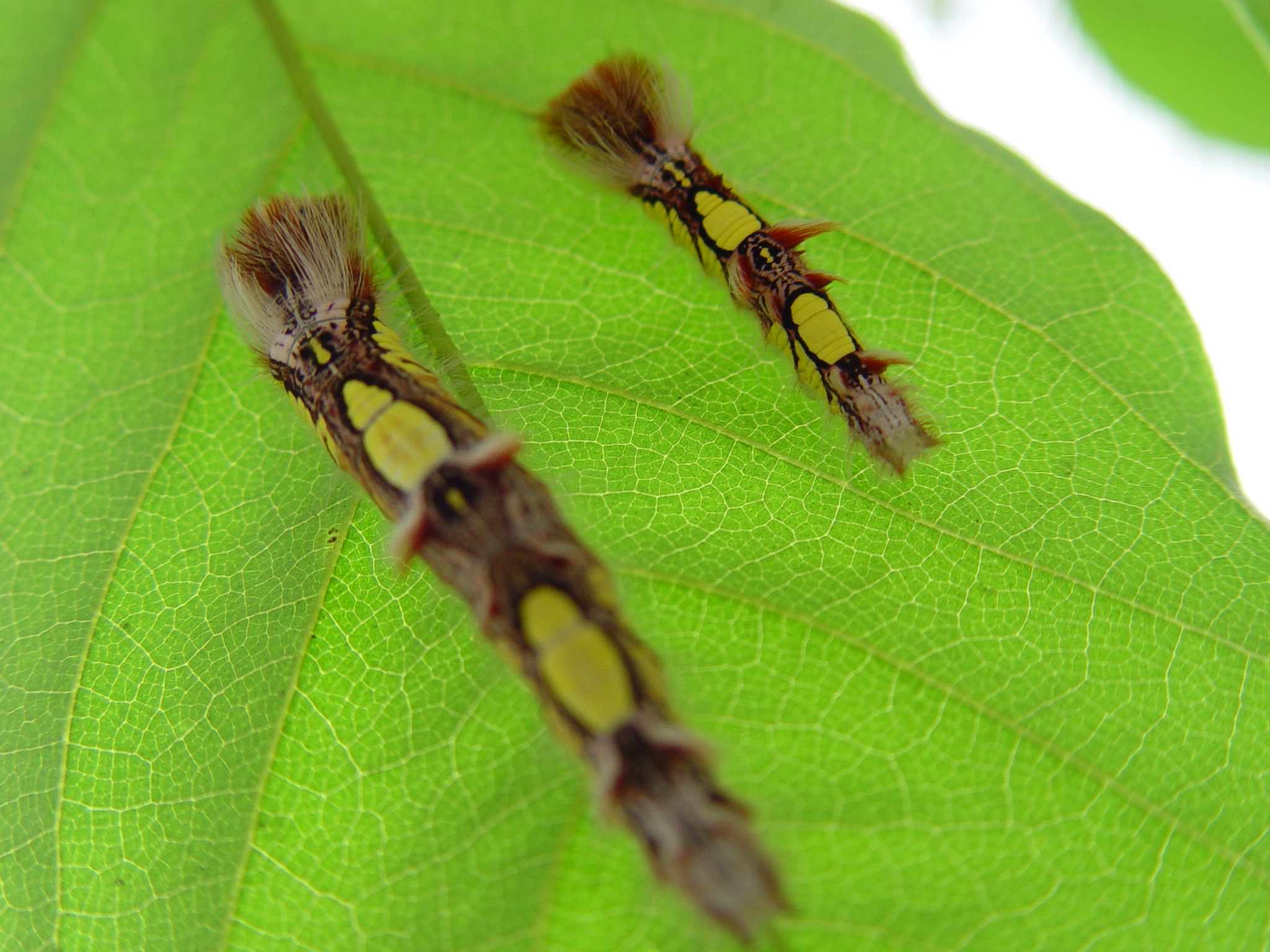
Caterpillar

=== Egg ===
The egg of the Morpho menelaus butterfly is typically small, round, and somewhat flattened. They are usually pale green or whitish in color, sometimes with a slightly metallic sheen, but not as vibrant as the adult butterfly's iridescent blue wings, and shaped like dew drops. The female laid around 12 eggs in cluster of 5 or 6 eggs on the undersides of the leaves. The eggs are laid so that the caterpillars may feed as soon as they hatch.

=== Caterpillars ===
These social caterpillars feed on Erythroxylum, Dalbergia, and Fabaceae, and may prefer to feed on new leaves of host plants since these new leaves are easier and more nutritious to eat. The caterpillars are red-brown in color with bright green spots. They are covered with bristles that release an irritant upon contact. Conversely, the peak of the caterpillar is in the dry season, a climate that is unsuitable for most animal communities. These caterpillars will enter diapause or suspend development and can delay pupation in order to survive this harsh period and the lack of water. As the dry season continues, the caterpillar population declines due to predation.

=== Adults ===
One of the best seasonal predictors of adult butterfly occurrence is the ripening of zoochorous fruit. Adult emergence occurs primarily in the beginning of the wet season, when the climate and air humidity makes food resources plentiful and oviposition advantageous. The butterfly spends 3 to 4 weeks as an adult, and the entire life cycle is about 115 days. Adults fly along rivers, or anywhere that open land has been revealed.

== Adaptations ==
Eyespots on wings are visual anti-predatory adaptations that have evolved in many species within Lepidoptera. The eyespots are usually dark circles surrounded by a brighter outer layer. The 'pupil' of the eye has a sparkle that mimics the natural reflection of the cornea. These eyes are thought to deflect a predator's attack away from more vital organs and toward that spot on the wings. Bigger eyespots have also been shown to deter predators from attacking completely. Menelaus specifically has an eyespot that is 6.8 mm in diameter on its ventral wings that it uses to help avoid predation.

== Wing structure ==
The wings of Morpho menelaus are a prime example of iridescent blue coloration in the insect world. The bright and iridescent colors of other butterflies are typically caused by optical interference, but the iridescent blue color of butterflies in the family Morphidae results from the microstructures of the wings. Scientists use SEM, scanning electronic microscope, and spectroscopy, to understand the wings in greater detail.

=== Structural components ===
Each wing is covered in multi-layered scales, which are responsible for the coloration of the wings. The wing colors vary with viewing angle, a phenomenon referred to as structural color. In the female, the dorsal side is more camouflaged while the male presents with a vibrant blue. In the male, the outer layer of the cover scales are long and narrow (250 μm × 50 μm), 2 μm apart, and parallel to the wing plane. The dimensions of the cover scales in other species of the subfamily Morphinae vary greatly, but all are pigment-less and lowly iridescent. The inner layer, called ground scales, are pigmented, iridescent, do not overlap, and are responsible for the blue coloration. They consist of alternating layers of chitin and air, each having its own refractive indexes. The wings of the genus Morpho are noteworthy for their diversity of function, including being hydrophobic, lightweight, sturdy, thermally regulated, and bright blue iridescent. These unique characteristics originate from the photonic nanostructures in the ridges of the scales. There has been increasing interest in the bioengineering community into understanding the structural components of the wing which can have potential applications in creating structural-color devices and selective gas-sensors.

Adult male from Brazil

=== Iridescence ===
Iridescence is the phenomenon when light interacts with a particular surface, and at differing angles of illumination and observation the color begins to gradually change. The Morpho Menelaus' characteristic iridescent wings has a unique wing structure. The ground scales are covered by a set of longitudinal ridges, and within the ridges are layers of lamella. Because the size of the microstructure is the same as the wavelength of light, the layers in the wings react strongly with visible light. The ground and cover scales have an observable "Christmas-tree" structure which is responsible for the diffraction or bending of light pattern of the wings which results in the characteristic iridescence blue color.

Within the ground scales are layers of lamella. The upper lamina is closely marked with longitudinal ridges. The ridges themselves consist of individual lamellae (6–12) which overlap like shingles on a roof. The inter-spacings of the lamella layers is around 80 nm, but there are variations in the thickness of each lamella. A network of netted trabeculae separates neighboring lamellae.

=== Hydrophobic surface ===
A superhydrophobic surface is when water is dropped, a spherical ball forms and rolls off the surface. Any dirt or dust that is on the surface will be removed along with the water drop forming. The wings of Morpho menelaus have attracted potential research interest because of its self-cleaning property. The microstructure of the wing plays an important role in this unique feature.

== Collections ==
Morpho menelaus is unique because of its iridescent blue color and large wingspan. They are one of the most familiar and recognizable neotropical insects. Over the past century, there has been an accumulation of these butterflies in both private and museum collections, and they are considered highly valuable among collectors, artists, and designers for their beautiful coloration and are widely hunted or bred for decorative purposes. Because of the popularity of collecting and rearing Morpho species for sale, there is a wide discrepancy in its taxonomic understanding among collectors.

== Gallery ==
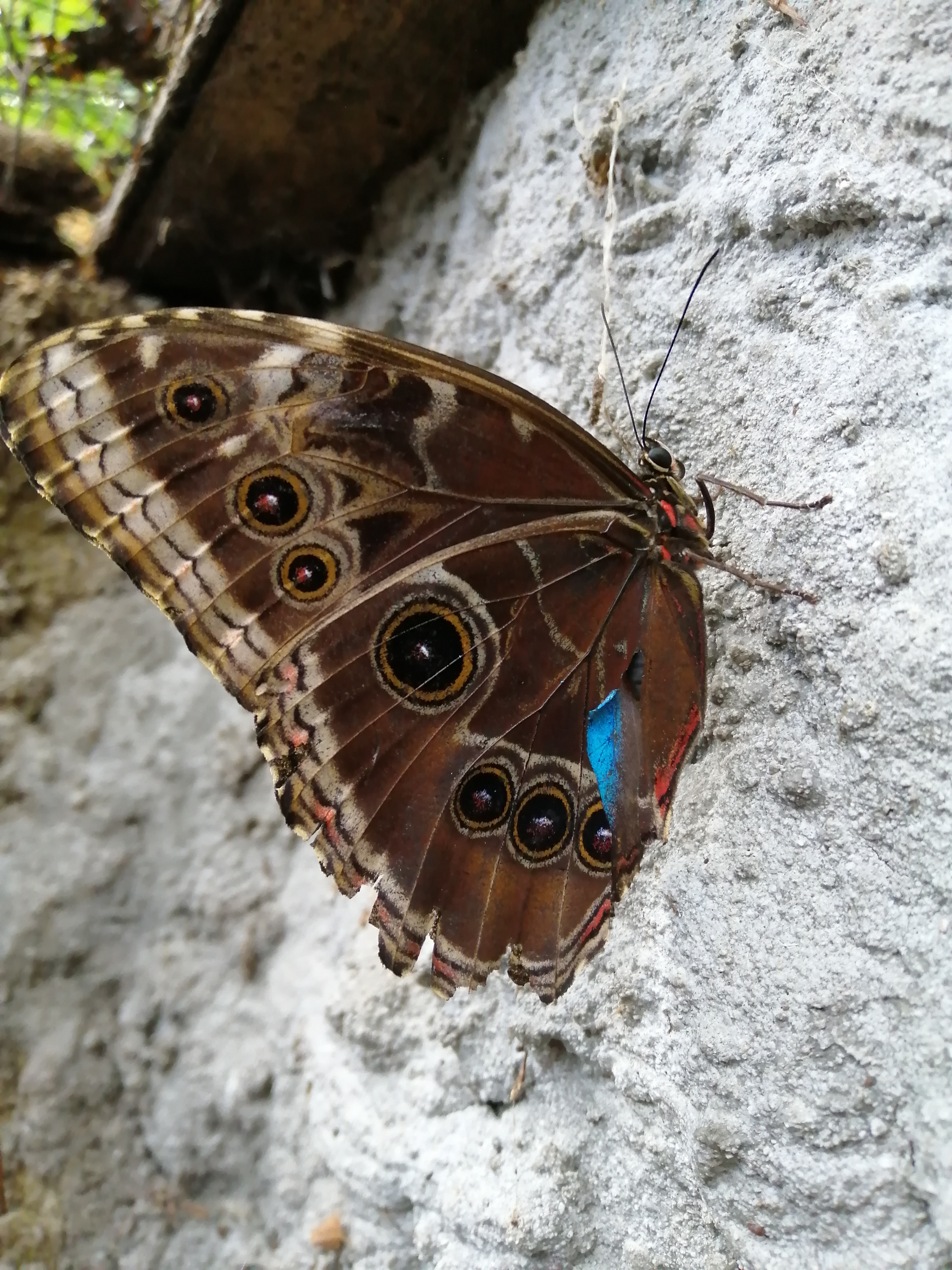
Morpho menelaus with closed wings

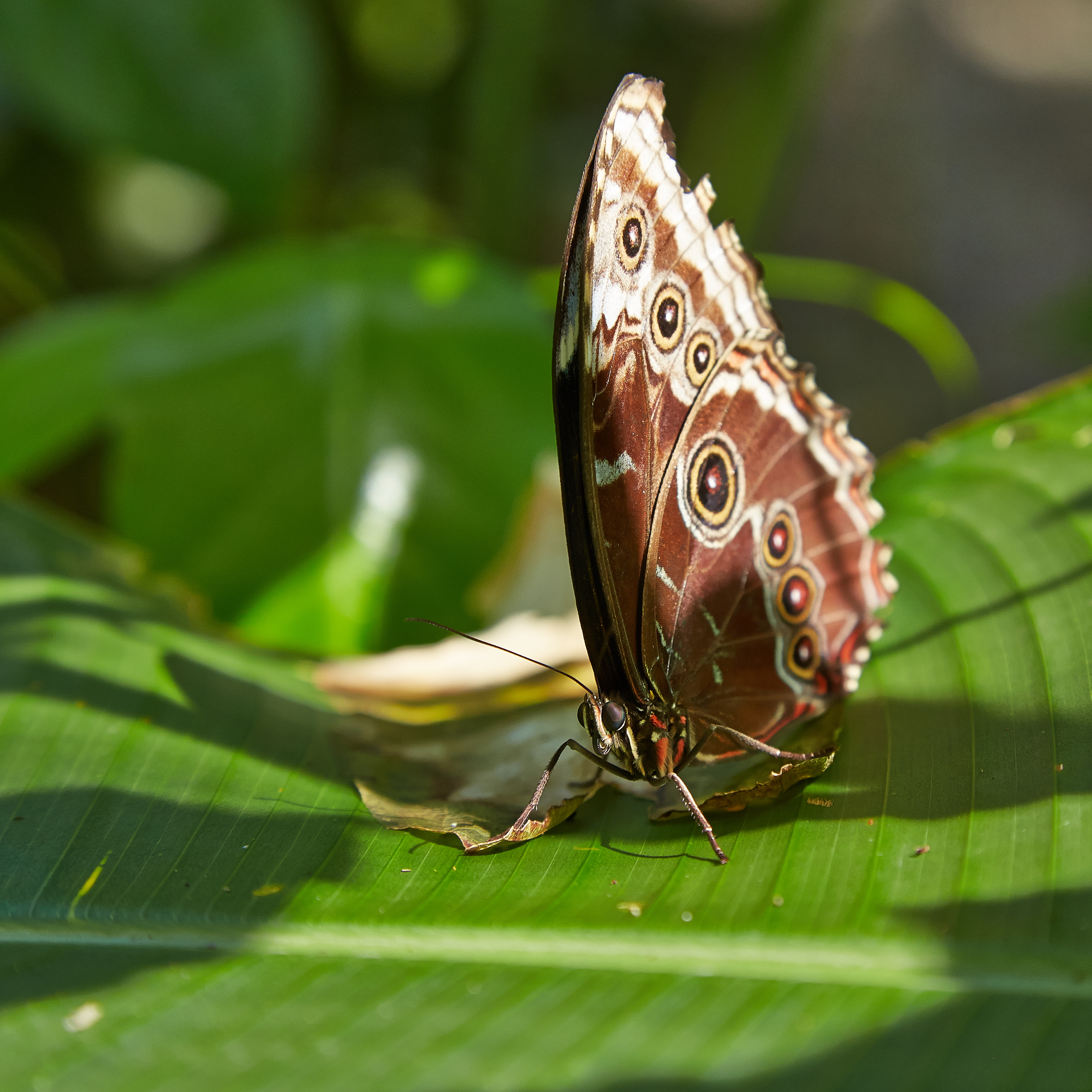
Morpho menelaus with closed wings

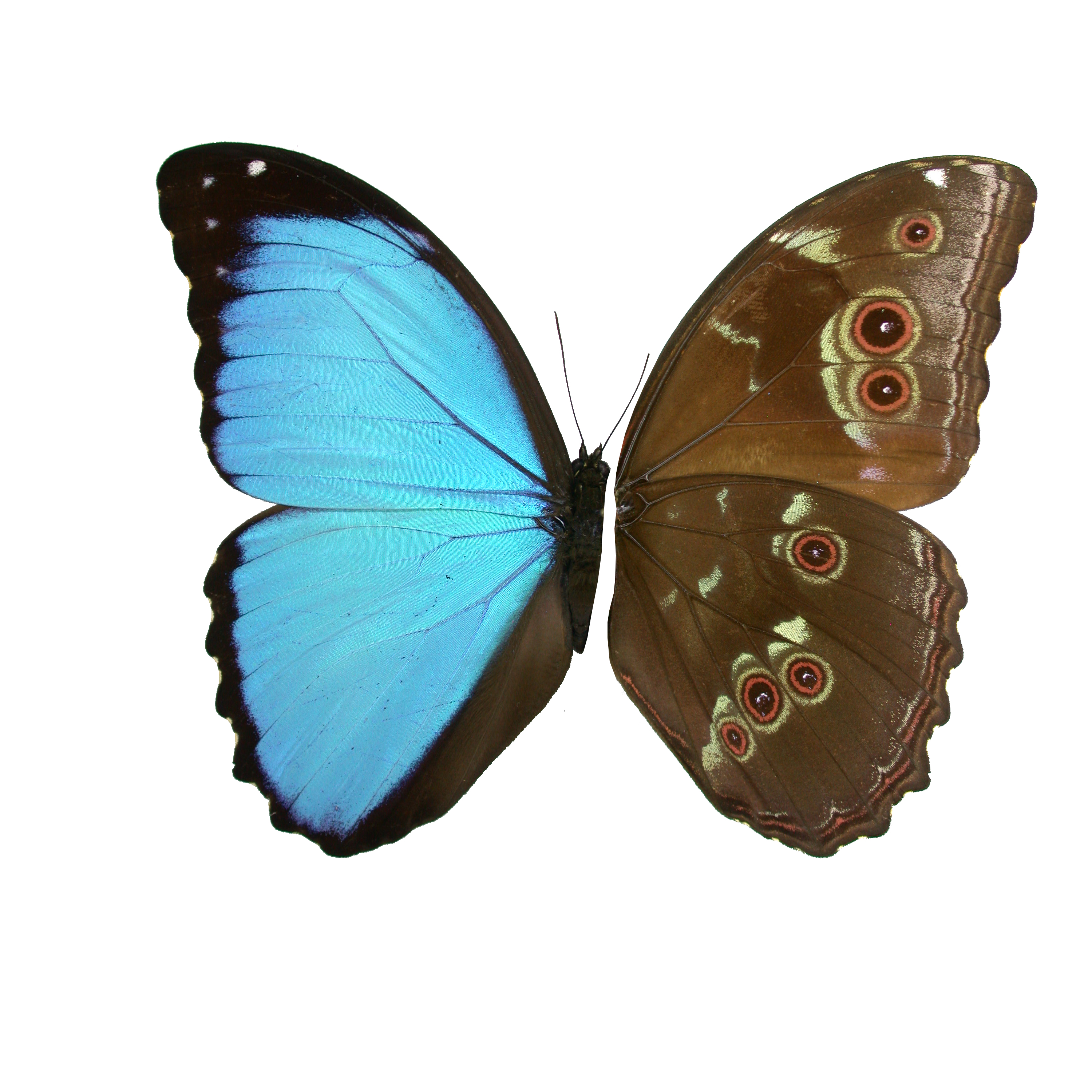
Morpho menelaus, wings comparation
