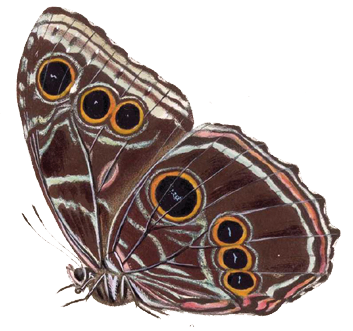
- Illustration from Biologia Centrali-Americana

Scientific classification
- Domain: Eukaryota
- Kingdom: Animalia
- Phylum: Arthropoda
- Class: Insecta
- Order: Lepidoptera
- Family: Nymphalidae
- Genus: Morpho
- Species: M. granadensis

Binomial name
- Morpho granadensis Felder and Felder, 1867

= Morpho granadensis =

Granada morpho

Species of butterfly

Morpho granadensis, the Granada morpho, is a Neotropical butterfly that is primarily found in Costa Rica. Several subspecies and many forms have been described. It is considered, by some authors, to be a subspecies of Morpho deidamia. Morpho granadensis is exceedingly rare in museum collections and the type specimen is from Costa Rica. The species is narrowly restricted in Costa Rica to band of tropical rain forest within 100 to 600 meters elevation along the Caribbean watershed of the Cordillera Central and the adjacent highlands. Several studies show that Morpho granadensis is half as abundant as other species like Morpho peleides.

== Etymology ==
The first specimen collected on the voyage of the Navarra was from Neu Granada.

== See also ==
- Morpho Menelaus
