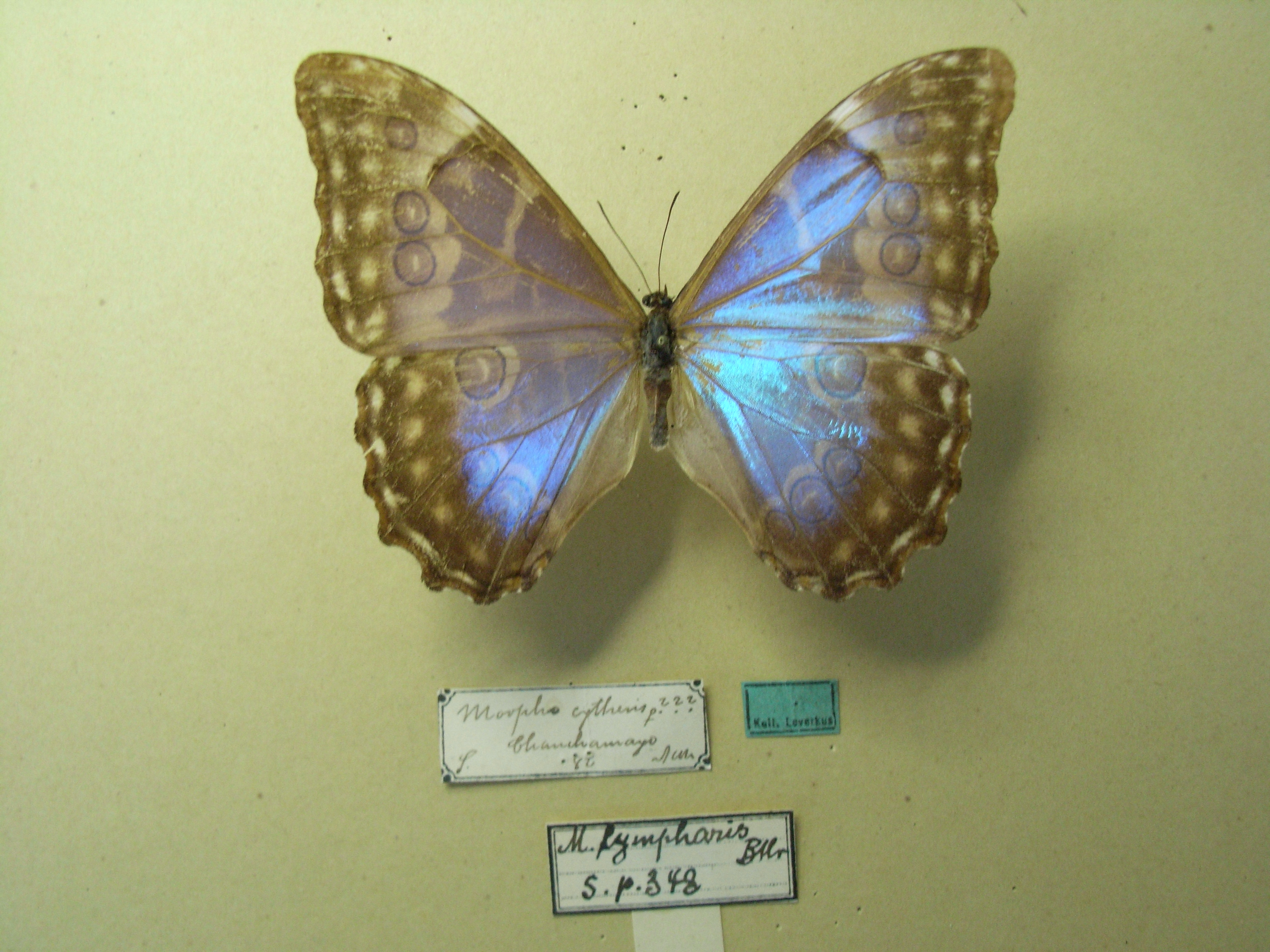
- From Chanchamayo Province, Peru

Scientific classification
- Domain: Eukaryota
- Kingdom: Animalia
- Phylum: Arthropoda
- Class: Insecta
- Order: Lepidoptera
- Family: Nymphalidae
- Genus: Morpho
- Species: M. lympharis

Binomial name
- Morpho lympharis (Butler, 1873)

= Morpho lympharis =

Lympharis morpho

Species of butterfly

Morpho lympharis, the Lympharis morpho, is a Neotropical butterfly found in Peru and Bolivia.

== Description ==
Morpho lympharis is a large butterfly. The crystal-clear wings are suffused blue or iridescent pink. The reverse side is decorated with a row of ocelli.

Morpho lympharis replaces M. portis in the Andean region, but has hitherto only been found in Peru and was described from Paucartambo Province. The male above are somewhat darker blue than M. aega and with subapical white punctiform spots on the forewing. The underside of both wings is decorated with three ocelli, of which the apical and the two intermediate ones are elongate-oval in shape. Otherwise as M. portis.

== Taxonomy ==
Blandin (1993), considers Morpho lympharis conspecific with Morpho sulkowskyi and that it is one of a north-south succession of subspecies spread from Colombia to Bolivia. Lamas (2004) considers that there are two species, M. sulkowskyi ranging from Colombia to central Peru, and M. lympharis, ranging from central Peru to Bolivia.

== Habitat ==
Morpho sulkowskyi and Morpho lympharis uniquely occupy Tropical Andes cloud forests, at altitudes between 1500 and 3500 m.
