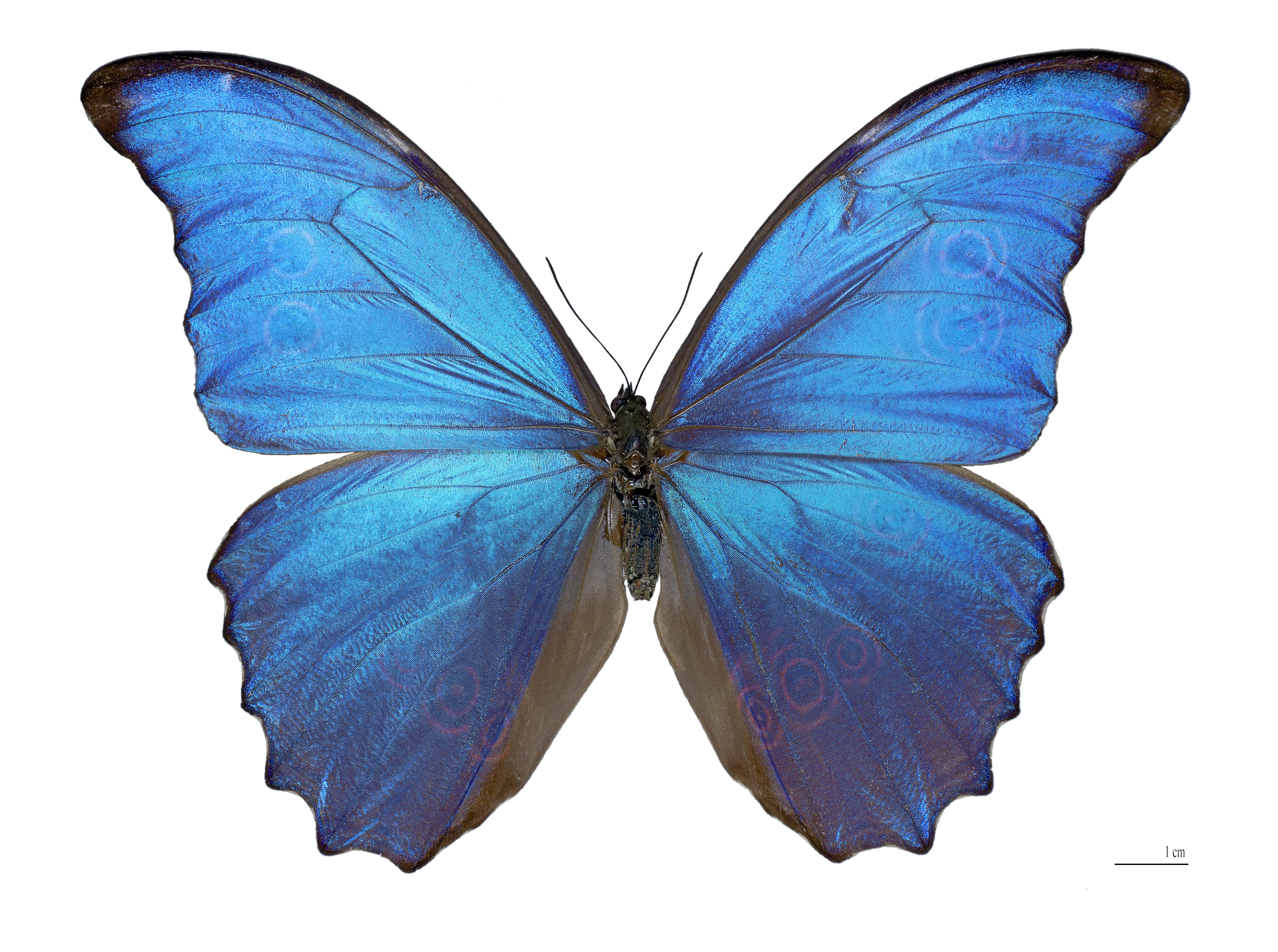
- Dorsal view of male (MHNT)
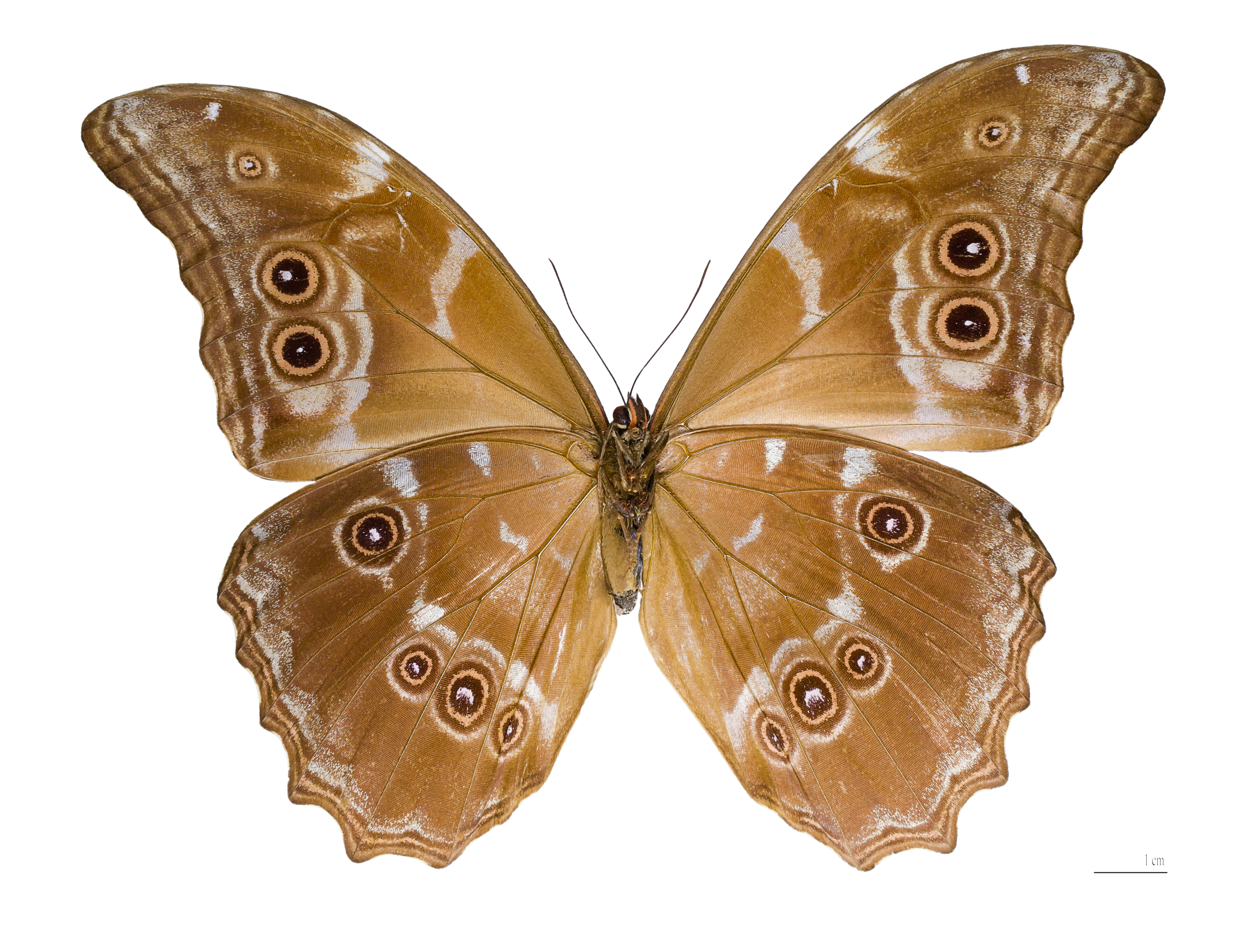
- Ventral view of same specimen

Scientific classification
- Kingdom: Animalia
- Phylum: Arthropoda
- Class: Insecta
- Order: Lepidoptera
- Family: Nymphalidae
- Genus: Morpho
- Species: M. didius

Binomial name
- Morpho didius Hopffer, 1874

Synonyms
- Morpho didius f. incompta Talbot, 1929; Morpho didius hypanophthalma Niepelt, 1934; Morpho didius f. flavolimbata Niepelt, 1934; Morpho didius f. bipunctata Rousseau-Decelle, 1935; Morpho didius f. subrufa Rousseau-Decelle, 1935; Morpho didius didius f. albomarginalis Weber, 1951; Morpho (Grasseia) didius pseudassarpai Le Moult & Réal, 1962; Morpho (Grasseia) didius didius f. destituta Le Moult & Réal, 1962; Morpho (Grasseia) didius didius f. rubiginosa Le Moult & Réal, 1962; Morpho (Grasseia) didius didius f. decompta Le Moult & Réal, 1962; Morpho (Grasseia) didius didius f. decempunctata Le Moult & Réal, 1962; Morpho (Grasseia) didius didius f. nucleata Le Moult & Réal, 1962; Morpho (Grasseia) didius didius f. diluta Le Moultt & Réal, 1962; Morpho (Grasseia) didius f. limbata Le Moult & Réal, 1962; Morpho (Grasseia) didius didius f. scopifera Le Moult & Réal, 1962; Morpho (Grasseia) didius didius f. atlas Le Moult & Réal, 1962; Morpho (Grasseia) didius f. caeca Le Moult & Réal, 1962; Morpho (Grasseia) didius didius f. nana Le Moult & Réal, 1962; Morpho (Grasseia) occidentalis kruegeri f. stygia Le Moult & Réal, 1962; Morpho (Grasseia) godarti [sic] assarpai f. coelicolor Le Moult & Réal, 1962

= Morpho didius =

Species of butterfly

Morpho didius, the metallic blue morpho, is a Neotropical butterfly belonging to the subfamily Morphinae of family Nymphalidae. It is considered, by some authors, to be a subspecies of Morpho menelaus.

== Description ==
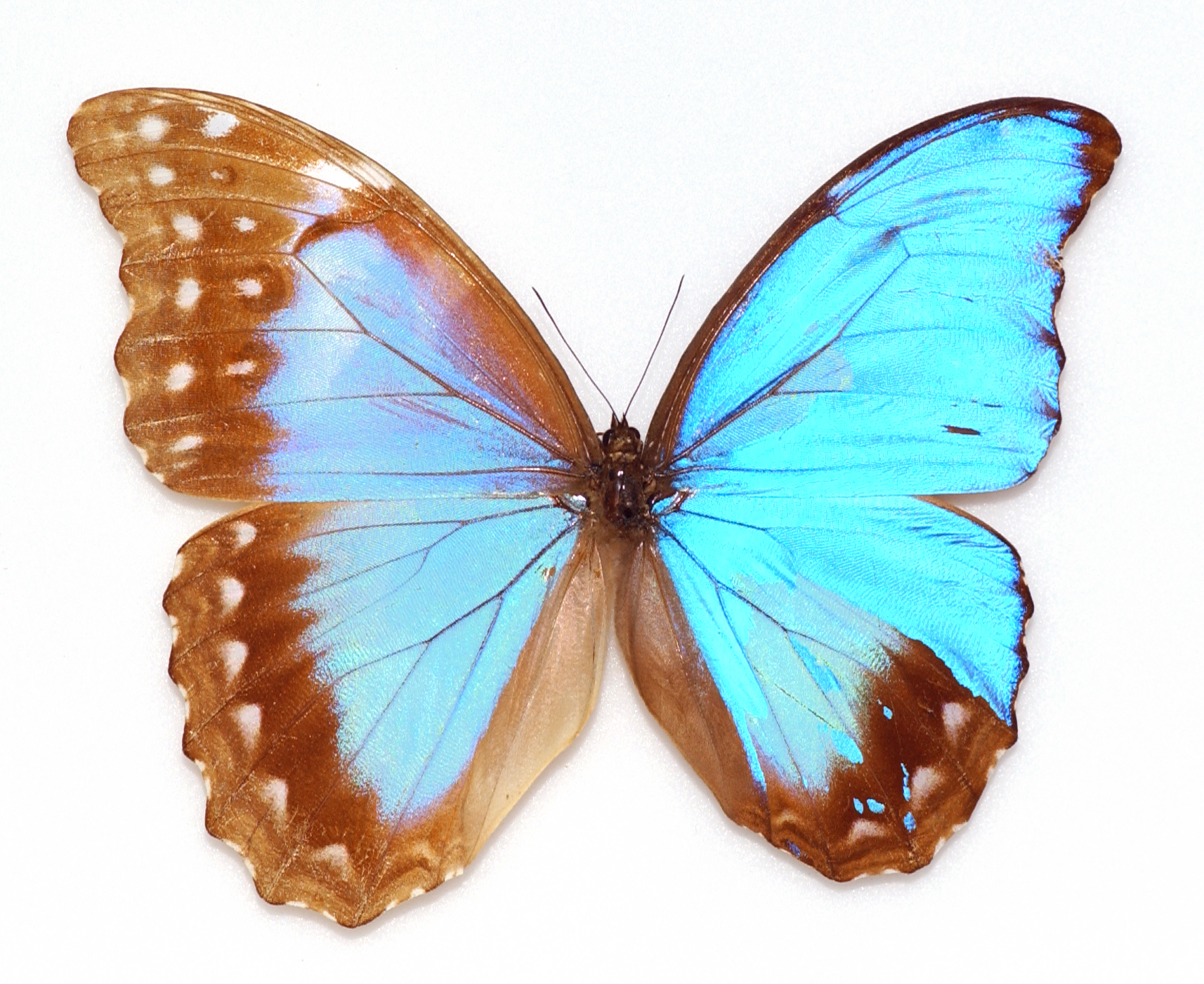
Morpho didius This specimen is a gynandromorph (Musée d'histoire naturelle de Lille).

Morpho didius has a wingspan reaching 150 millimetres (5.9 in), making it one of the largest of Morpho species. The dorsal side of the wings are iridescent and metallic blue, and the forewings are quite elongated.

== Distribution ==
This species can be found in Peru.

== Biology ==
The larva feeds on palm trees.
