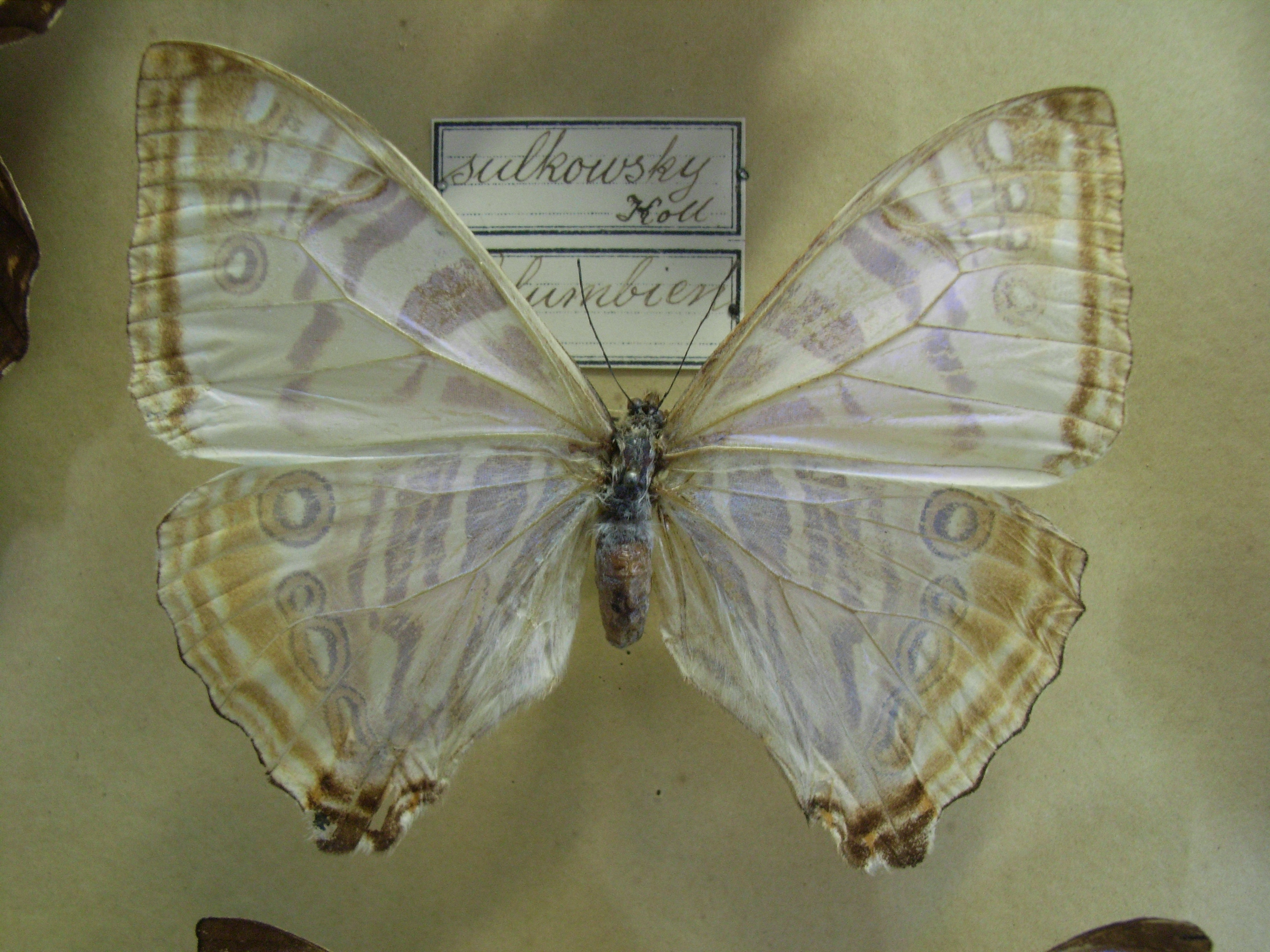

Scientific classification
- Kingdom: Animalia
- Phylum: Arthropoda
- Clade: Pancrustacea
- Class: Insecta
- Order: Lepidoptera
- Family: Nymphalidae
- Genus: Morpho
- Species: M. sulkowskyi

Binomial name
- Morpho sulkowskyi (Kollar, 1850)

= Morpho sulkowskyi =

Sulkowsky's morpho

Species of butterfly

Morpho sulkowskyi, or Sulkowsky's morpho, is a Neotropical butterfly. It is found in Colombia, Ecuador and Peru.

== Habitat ==
Morpho sulkowskyi is a Tropical Andes cloud forest specialist (above 800 to 1,500 meters as high as 3500 meters). Morpho sulkowskyi and Morpho lympharis are the sole Morphos occupying this habitat.

== Taxonomy ==
Morpho sulkowskyi and Morpho lympharis may be conspecific. There are several subspecies and many forms have been described.

== Subspecies ==
- Morpho sulkowskyi sulkowskyi V. Kollar, 1850
- Morpho sulkowskyi hoppiana F.W. Niepelt, 1923
- Morpho sulkowskyi selenaris E. Le Moult & P. Réal, 1962
- Morpho sulkowskyi sirene F.W. Niepelt, 1911

== Similar species ==
It is very similar to, and maybe conspecific with Morpho lympharis.

== Colors ==
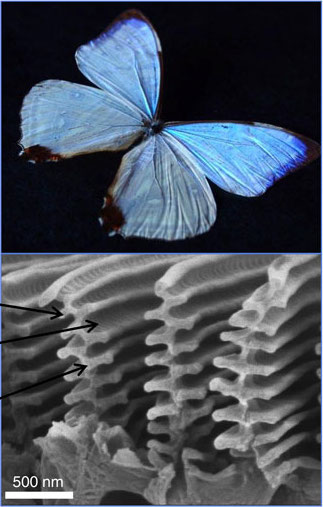
Iridescent colors of Morpho sulkowskyi are caused by the specific nanostructures on its wings (SEM images at the bottom).

The color of a Morpho sulkowskyi is white with a holographic shine to them. Both the presence of fluorescent pigments in their wings and the nanostructure of their wings are responsible for the iridescent fluorescence of M. sulkowskyi. The major blue fluorescent pigment contributing to the fluorescence of M. sulkowskyi was found to be L-erythro biopterin, along with minor components of pterin and isoxanthopterin.
