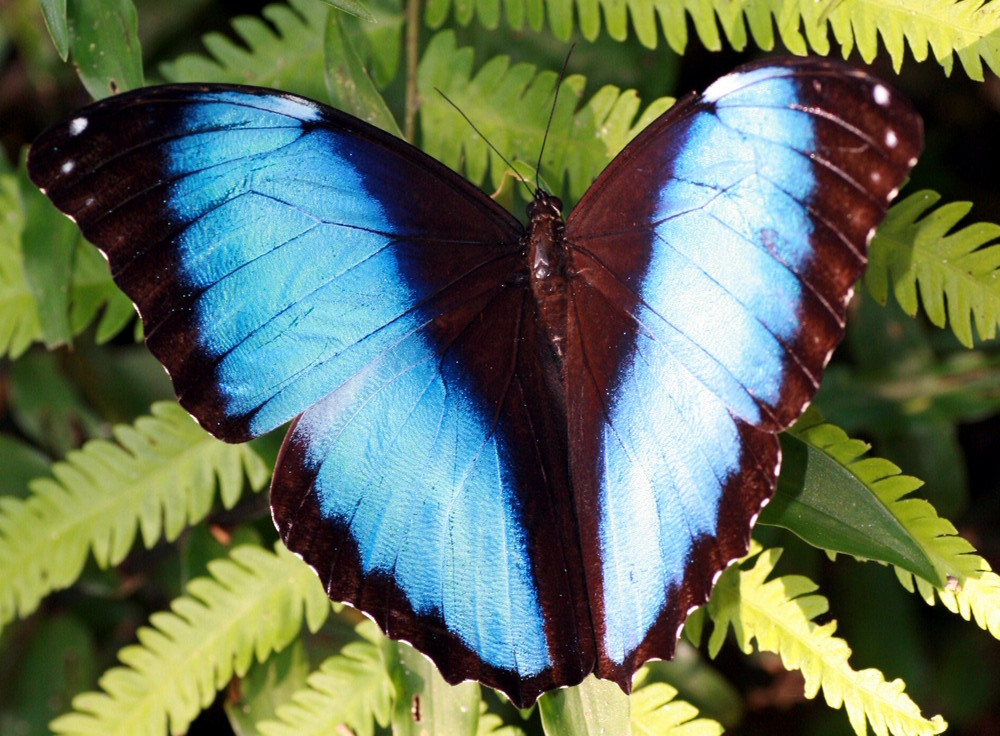
- In Tingo Maria, Peru
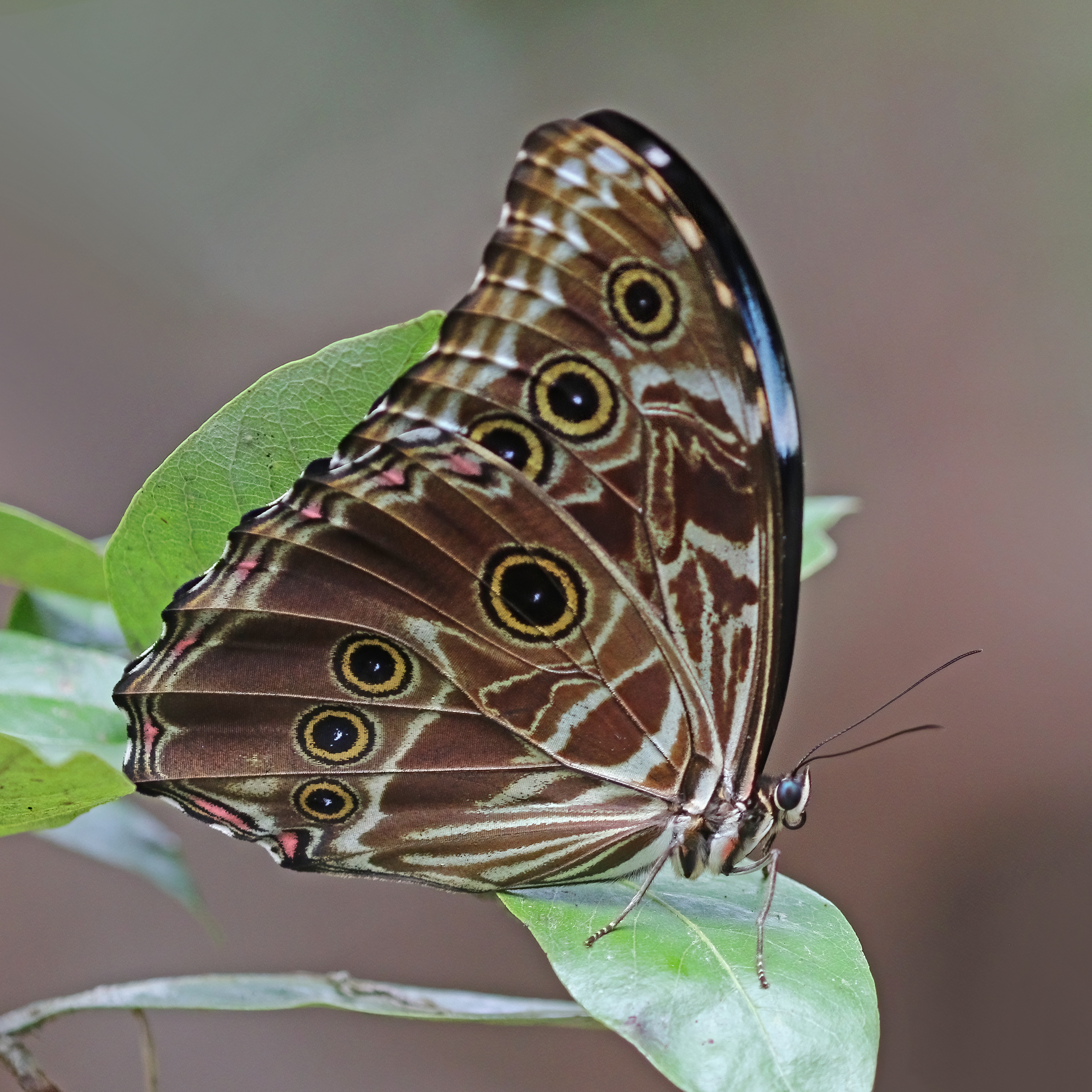
- Male M. d. neoptolemus, Brazil

Scientific classification
- Kingdom: Animalia
- Phylum: Arthropoda
- Clade: Pancrustacea
- Class: Insecta
- Order: Lepidoptera
- Family: Nymphalidae
- Genus: Morpho
- Species: M. deidamia

Binomial name
- Morpho deidamia (Hübner, 1819)

= Morpho deidamia =

Deidamia morpho

Species of butterfly

Morpho deidamia, the Deidamia morpho, is a Neotropical butterfly. It is found in Panama, Nicaragua, Costa Rica, Suriname, Bolivia, Venezuela, Colombia, Peru, Ecuador, and Brazil. It is a species group, which may be, or may not be several species. Many subspecies have been described.

== Description ==
The basal part of the upper surface in the males brilliant steel blue, the distal area of both wings delicate light blue. But in the female the proximal region is darkened, being broadly black, though with intensive metallic reflection. Forewing with three white median dots, the light blue restricted to a relatively narrow median area.

== Taxonomy ==
The accepted subspecies are:

- M. d. neoptolemus Wood, 1863 (Brazil: Amazonas, Colombia, Peru) Basal part of both wings black brown, only distally with slight dark blue sheen. Female: The blue median band of both wings broader, darker but more glossy blue than in the nominate deidamia. Under surface with somewhat less extended red submarginal patches, but with more copious white reticulation.
- M. d. granadensis C. & R. Felder, [1867] (Nicaragua, Panama, Colombia, Ecuador, Venezuela) Upper surface similar to Morpho peleides, but the black distal border considerably more extended, the wings more rounded, the Morpho reflection deeper blue, and especially characterized by its large, light cinnamon-brown ringed ocelli, those on the forewing of uniform size, whilst on the hindwing the apical eyespots far surpass the three closely approximated anal ocelli.
- M. d. polybaptus Butler, 1875 (Nicaragua, Costa Rica, Panama) The black distal area of the upper surface somewhat widened and the white subapical spot of the forewing more strongly expressed. On the under surface the whitish yellow anteterminal bands are more prominent and the bordering to the ocelli is of a finer bronzy greenish colour. Median band of the hindwing strongly elbowed, distally with a nose-shaped projection in the middle of the wing.
- M. d. pyrrhus Staudinger, 1887 (Peru)
- M. d. electra Röber, 1903 (Bolivia) A highly specialized local form from Bolivia with the hindwing decidedly more rounded and the forewing shorter. The upper surface is brilliant light blue, in certain lights with greenish gloss. The black distal margin very narrow, at the hinder angle of the forewing only about 2 mm and at the apex about 10 mm, in the middle of the hindwing about 3 mm in breadth. In the apex of the forewing are placed two white spots; the costal margin of the forewing is brown black from the base to the discocellular, the white costal spot which follows about 10 mm in length. The base of the wing only very slightly darkened. Under surface dark red brown; the form of the light markings quite similar to those of deidamia, but the eyespots much smaller, margined with red yellow (granadensis Felder, but the subapical eyespot of the hindwing is considerably larger in the latter), the distal-marginal markings are white (not yellow as in deidamia), the proximal silver white markings reduced, less continuous, and at the distal margin of the hindwing there are only small, narrow red longitudinal spots (no transverse band).
- M. d. hermione Röber, 1903 (Colombia) Differs from the typical deidamia of the Lower Amazon in having the black distal border much narrower; at the posterior angle of the forewing it is only about 2 mm in breadth, but gradually widens and at the apex attains a breadth of about 1.5 mm; the distal margin of the hindwing is about 3 mm in breadth in the middle. The greenish-blue median band is about 25 mm in breadth, with its proximal boundary sharp and almost straight, the distal indistinct. The dark brown basal part is about 18 mm in breadth and has only in the distal third a dark blue gloss. In the apex of the forewing are placed two small, distinct white spots and one very indistinct light one. At the costal margin of the forewing there is a small white spot. At the inner angle of the hindwing there are only traces of small reddish spots. The under surface is dark mahogany brown, on the hindwing somewhat lighter about the veins, the light markings are in shape almost like those of deidamia, but are much less developed (narrower) and of the submarginal brick-red spots of the hindwing only slight traces are present.
- M. d. neoptolemus Fruhstorfer, 1907 (Ecuador, Colombia) Basal part of both wings black brown, only distally with slight dark blue sheen. Female: the blue median band of both wings broader, darker but more glossy blue than in deidamia from Suriname and Obidos. Under surface with somewhat less extended red submarginal patches, but with more copious white reticulation.
- M. d. guaraura Le Cerf, 1925 (Venezuela)
- M. d. diomedes Weber, 1944 (Peru)
- M. d. diffusa Le Moult & Réal, 1962 (Brazil: Maranhão)
- M. d. steinbachi Le Moult & Réal, 1962 (Bolivia)
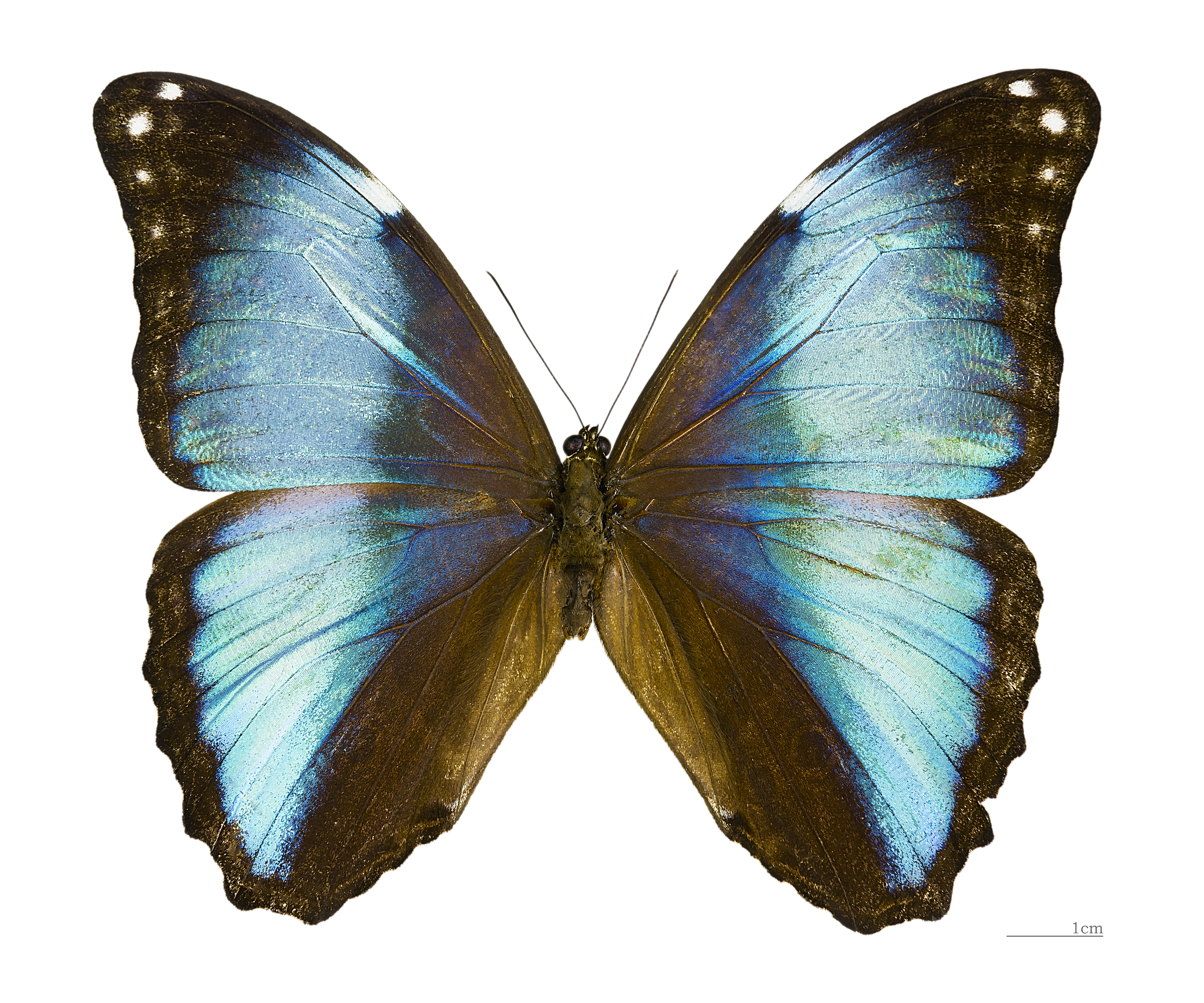
Morpho deidamia deidamia, male - MHNT

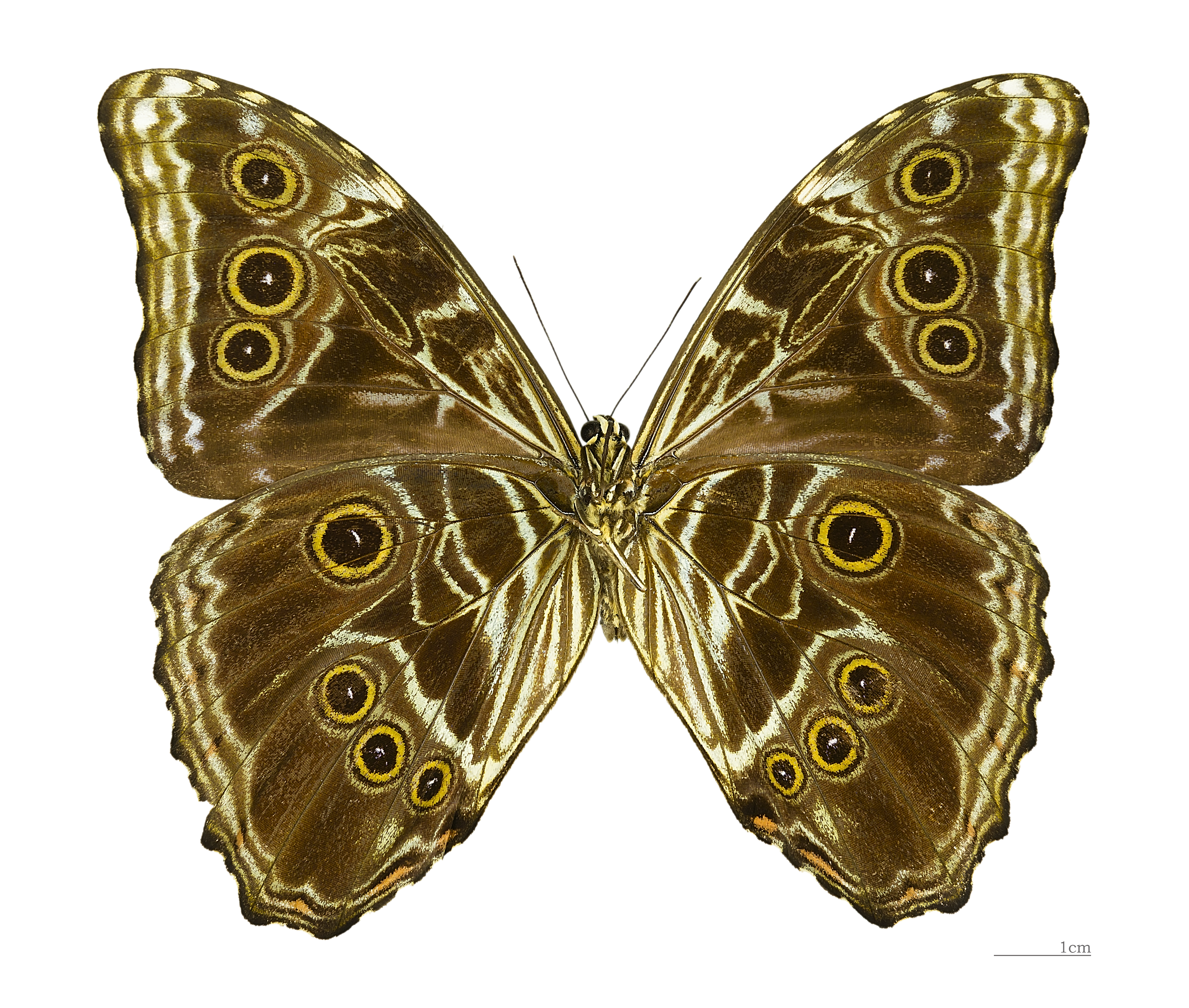
Morpho deidamia deidamia, male underside - MHNT

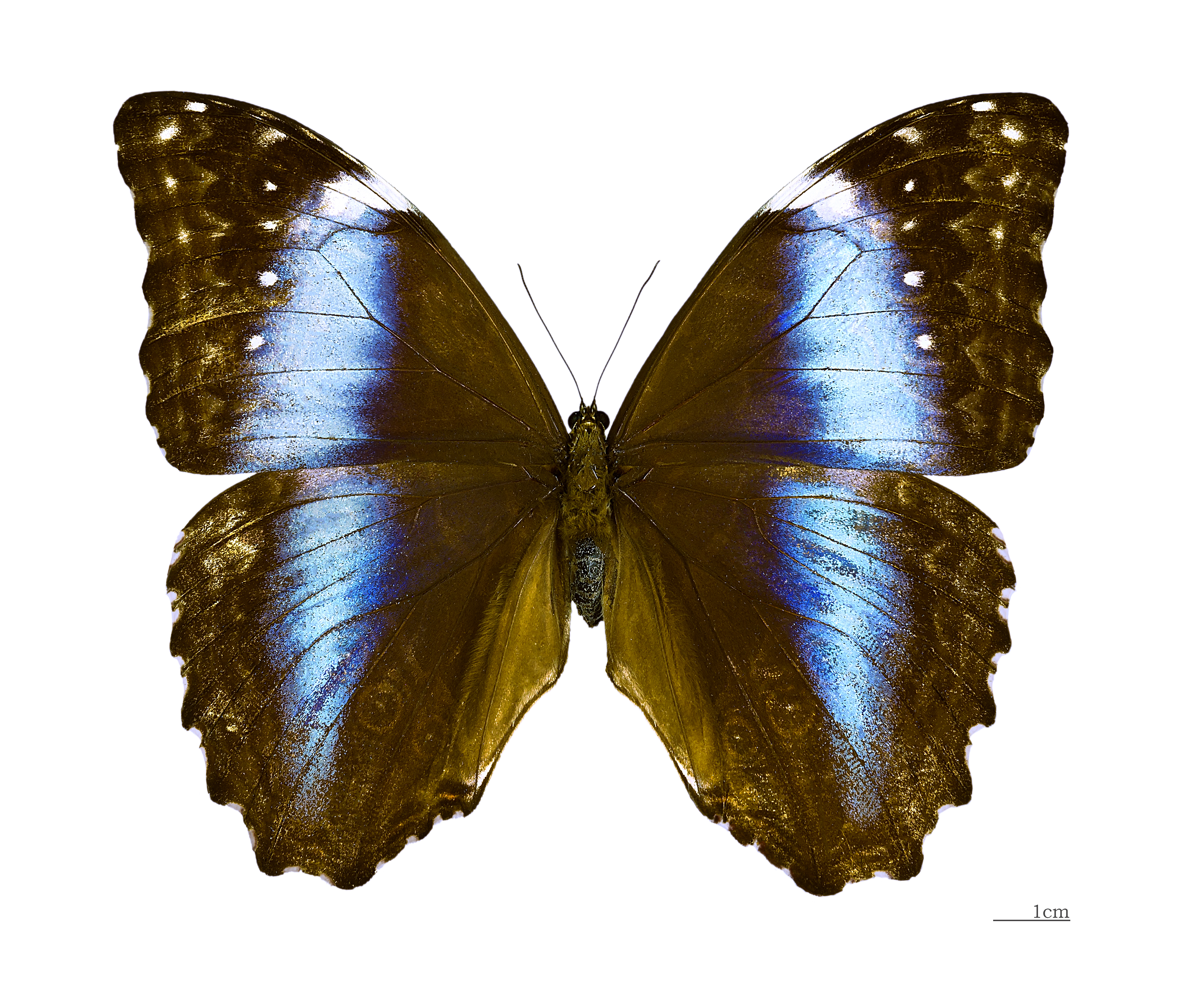
Morpho deidamia deidamia, female - MHNT

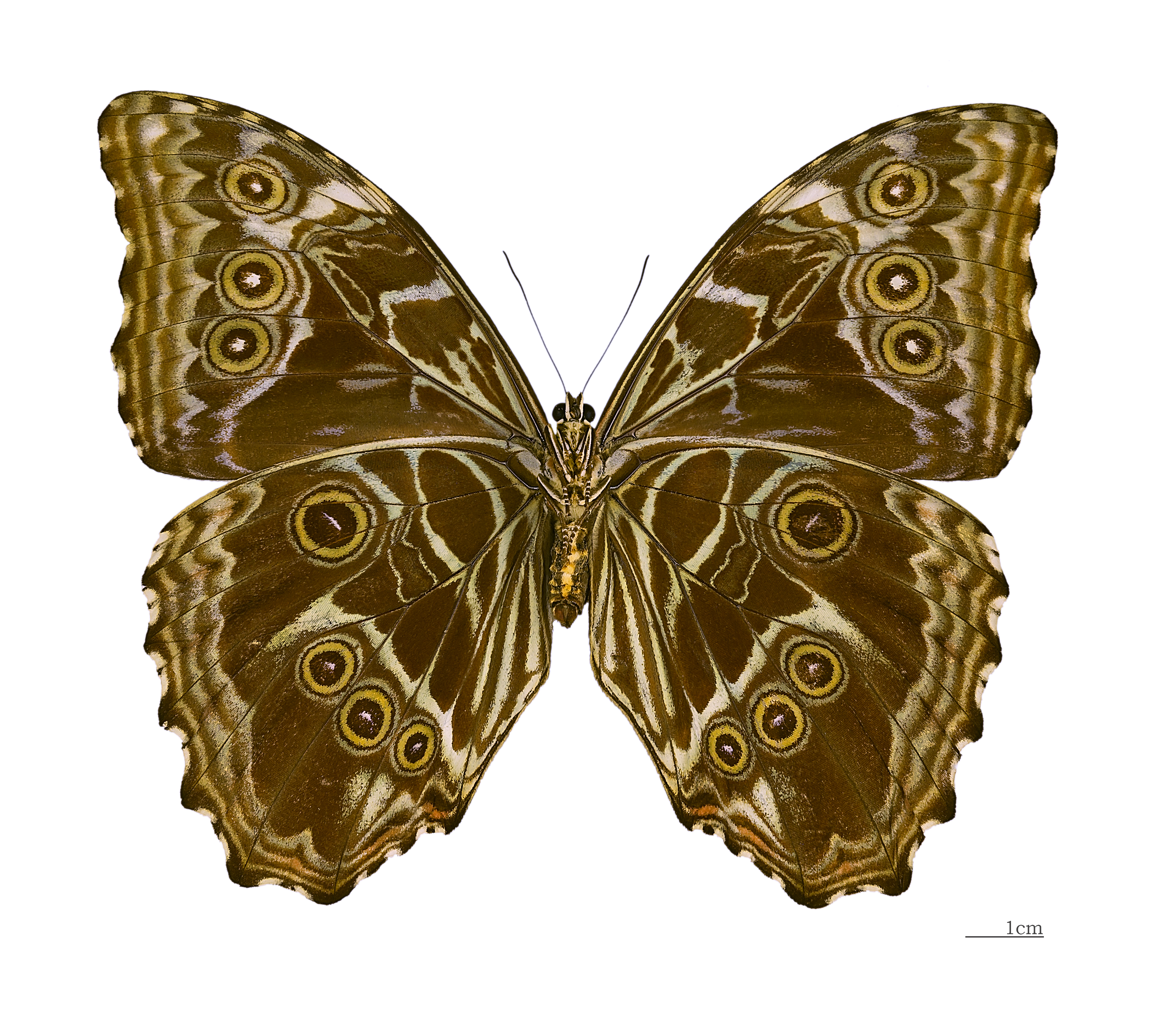
Morpho deidamia deidamia, female underside - MHNT

== Etymology ==
Deidamia was the daughter of Lycomedes, king of Scyros, figures in Greek mythology.

== In pop culture ==
The butterflies that often surround Soubi in the anime Loveless are probably males of this species.
